= McCurry, Missouri =

Extinct hamlet in Missouri, U.S.

Coordinates: 40°12′27″N 94°25′32″W

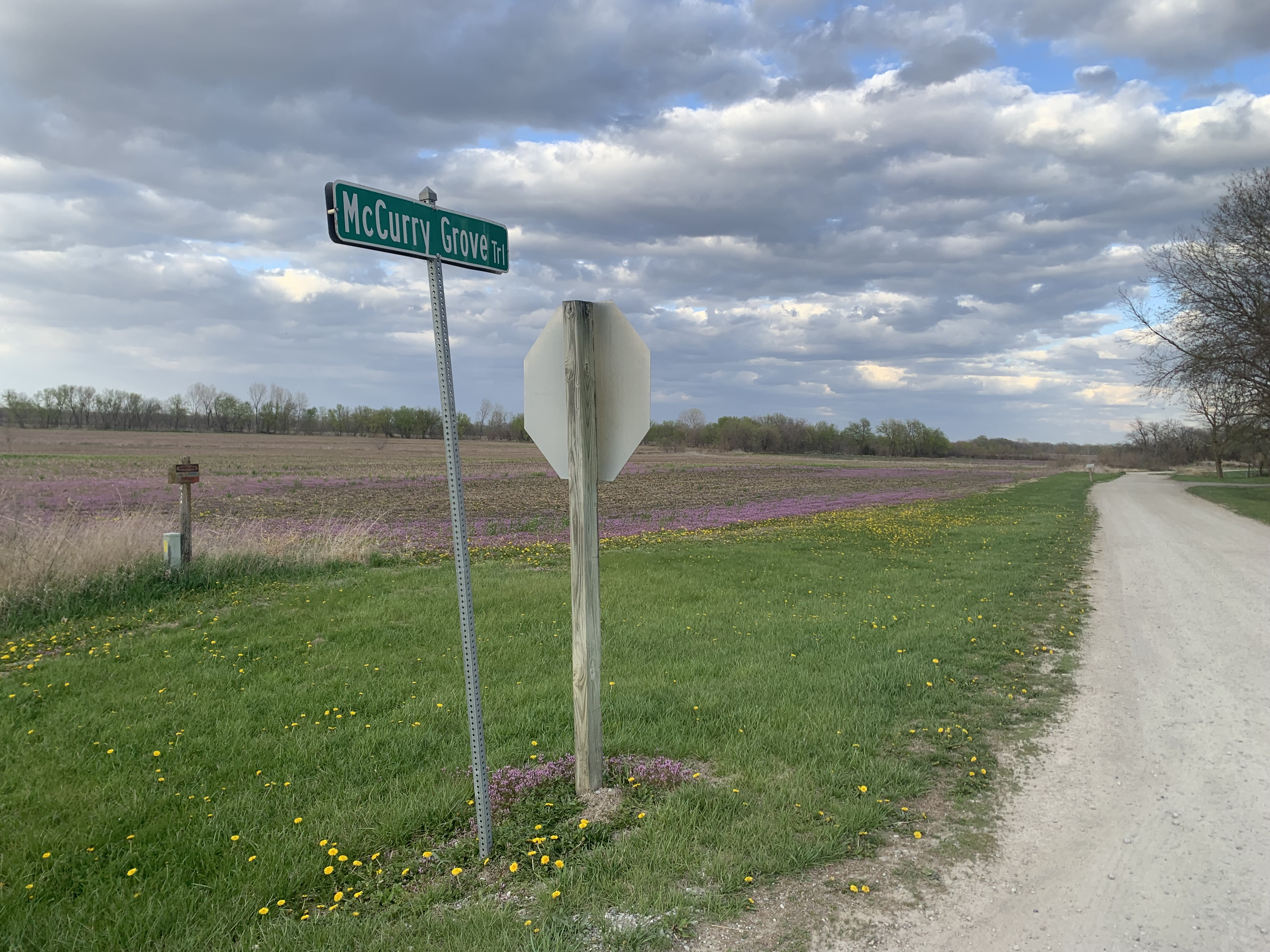
McCurry Grove Trail Street Sign

McCurry is an extinct hamlet in Gentry County, in the U.S. state of Missouri. The community is located on Missouri Route H, one half mile south of the Grand River. Darlington lies approximately two miles to the east-southeast and Carmack on U.S. Route 136 is two miles to the north.

== History ==
McCurry was platted in 1879 on the Wabash Railroad. The community has the name of William McCurry, an early settler. A post office called McCurry was established in 1881, and remained in operation until 1901. Nothing remains of McCurry but a street named for it.
