= McFall, Missouri =

City in Gentry County, Missouri, United States

- City
- Location of McFall, Missouri
- Coordinates: 40°06′42″N 94°13′20″W
- Country: United States
- State: Missouri
- County: Gentry
- Township: Miller

Area
  - Total: 0.31 sq mi (0.80 km^{2})
  - Land: 0.31 sq mi (0.80 km^{2})
  - Water: 0 sq mi (0.00 km^{2})
- Elevation: 984 ft (300 m)

Population (2020)
  - Total: 119
  - Density: 387.0/sq mi (149.43/km^{2})
- Time zone: UTC-6 (Central (CST))
  - Summer (DST): UTC-5 (CDT)
- ZIP code: 64657
- Area code: 660
- FIPS code: 29-45020
- GNIS feature ID: 2395065

McFall is a city in southeast Gentry County, Missouri, United States. The population was 119 at the 2020 census.

== History ==
McFall was laid out in 1879, and named after John McFall Sr., the original owner of the town site. A post office has been in operation at McFall since 1879.

== Geography ==
McFall is located on Missouri Route T adjacent to the Gentry-Daviess county line. Albany is approximately 10.5 miles to the northwest and Pattonsburg in Daviess County is six miles to the southeast. The Elam Bend Conservation Area on the Grand River is three miles to the southwest.

According to the United States Census Bureau, the city has a total area of 0.31 square miles (0.80 km^{2}), all land.

== Demographics ==
Historical population
| Census | Pop. | Note | %± |
|---|---|---|---|
| 1880 | 115 | | — |
| 1890 | 528 | | 359.1% |
| 1900 | 544 | | 3.0% |
| 1910 | 385 | | −29.2% |
| 1920 | 447 | | 16.1% |
| 1930 | 387 | | −13.4% |
| 1940 | 393 | | 1.6% |
| 1950 | 255 | | −35.1% |
| 1960 | 206 | | −19.2% |
| 1970 | 203 | | −1.5% |
| 1980 | 139 | | −31.5% |
| 1990 | 142 | | 2.2% |
| 2000 | 135 | | −4.9% |
| 2010 | 93 | | −31.1% |
| 2020 | 119 | | 28.0% |
U.S. Decennial Census

=== 2010 census ===
As of the census of 2010, there were 93 people, 44 households, and 26 families residing in the city. The population density was 300.0 inhabitants per square mile (115.8/km^{2}). There were 72 housing units at an average density of 232.3 per square mile (89.7/km^{2}). The racial makeup of the city was 100.0% White.

There were 44 households, of which 25.0% had children under the age of 18 living with them, 47.7% were married couples living together, 9.1% had a female householder with no husband present, 2.3% had a male householder with no wife present, and 40.9% were non-families. 38.6% of all households were made up of individuals, and 25% had someone living alone who was 65 years of age or older. The average household size was 2.11 and the average family size was 2.73.

The median age in the city was 47.8 years. 19.4% of residents were under the age of 18; 10.8% were between the ages of 18 and 24; 11.8% were from 25 to 44; 27% were from 45 to 64; and 31.2% were 65 years of age or older. The gender makeup of the city was 50.5% male and 49.5% female.

=== 2000 census ===
As of the census of 2000, there were 135 people, 57 households, and 34 families residing in the city. The population density was 436.0 inhabitants per square mile (168.3/km^{2}). There were 85 housing units at an average density of 274.5 per square mile (106.0/km^{2}). The racial makeup of the city was 97.78% White, 1.48% African American, and 0.74% from two or more races. Hispanic or Latino of any race were 1.48% of the population.

There were 57 households, out of which 33.3% had children under the age of 18 living with them, 45.6% were married couples living together, 8.8% had a female householder with no husband present, and 38.6% were non-families. 33.3% of all households were made up of individuals, and 21.1% had someone living alone who was 65 years of age or older. The average household size was 2.37 and the average family size was 3.03.

In the city the population was spread out, with 31.9% under the age of 18, 3.0% from 18 to 24, 25.2% from 25 to 44, 24.4% from 45 to 64, and 15.6% who were 65 years of age or older. The median age was 37 years. For every 100 females, there were 84.9 males. For every 100 females age 18 and over, there were 76.9 males.

The median income for a household in the city was $24,750, and the median income for a family was $27,679. Males had a median income of $22,708 versus $25,625 for females. The per capita income for the city was $28,852. There were 12.8% of families and 18.0% of the population living below the poverty line, including 21.3% of under eighteens and 24.2% of those over 64.

== See also ==
- List of cities in Missouri
