= Gentryville, Missouri =

Gentryville, Missouri may refer to:

- Gentryville, Douglas County, Missouri
- Gentryville, Gentry County, Missouri
