= Broadway Extension =

Broadway Extension can refer to one of the following:

- A planned extension of the Gloucestershire Warwickshire Railway in England
- Millennium Line Broadway extension, a planned extension of the Millennium Line in Vancouver, Canada
- A section of U.S. Route 77 in Oklahoma City, Oklahoma, United States
- A section of U.S. Route 169 in Kansas City, Missouri, United States
