= Island City =

Island City may refer to:

== In geography ==
- Island City, Indiana, an unincorporated settlement in the United States
- Island City, Kentucky
- Island City, Missouri
- Island City, Oregon, a city in the United States
- Island City, Fukuoka (アイランドシティ), a man-made island in Japan
- Island city, another name for South Mumbai; originally Mumbai was a city of seven islands.

== In entertainment ==
- Island City (1994 film), a television movie originally run on the Prime Time Entertainment Network
- Island City (2015 film)

== Others ==
- Island City (schooner), American sunken schooner listed in National Register of Historic Places
