= U.S. Route 169 in Missouri =

Segment of American highway

U.S. Route 169
- US 169 highlighted in red

Route information
- Auxiliary route of US 69
- Maintained by MoDOT
- Length: 126.907 mi (204.237 km)

Major junctions
- South end: I-70 / US-24 / US-40 / US-169 at the Kansas state line in Kansas City
- I-35 / I-70 in Kansas City; I-29 / US 71 in Kansas City; I-435 in Kansas City; I-29 / US 71 in St. Joseph
- North end: US 169 at the Iowa state line near Grant City

Location
- Country: United States
- State: Missouri
- Counties: Jackson, Clay, Clinton, Buchanan, Andrew, DeKalb, Gentry, Worth

Highway system
- United States Numbered Highway System; List; Special; Divided; Missouri State Highway System; Interstate; US; State; Supplemental
← Route 168	→ Route 171

U.S. Route 169 (US 169) is a U.S. Highway that travels from Tulsa, Oklahoma to Virginia, Minnesota. In the state of Missouri, US 169 enters the state from Kansas overlapped with I-70 / US 24 / US 40 at Kansas City and exits the state into Iowa north of Irena.

== Route description ==
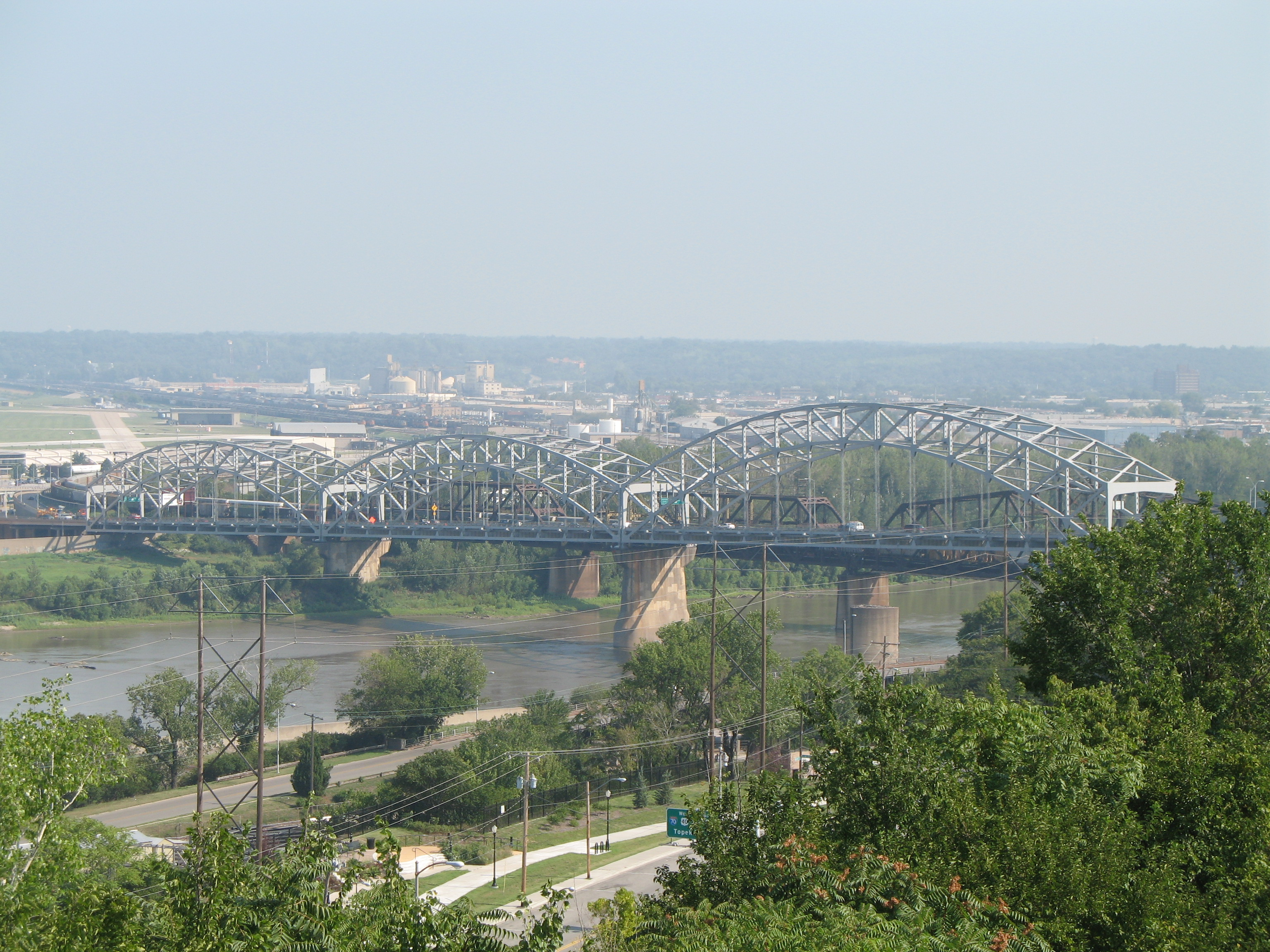
The Buck O'Neil Bridge (since replaced) carries US 169 over the Missouri River in Kansas City

The community of Rochester on US 169 in northwest Missouri.

US 169 enters Missouri from Kansas via the Lewis and Clark Viaduct overlapped with I-70 / US 24 / US 40. The highway leaves the overlap near an interchange with I-35 / Downtown Loop in the downtown area, traveling along Broadway Boulevard and crosses the Missouri River via the Buck O'Neil Bridge, becoming a freeway known as the Arrowhead Trafficway. North of the river, US 169 travels between Charles B. Wheeler Downtown Airport and the western edge of North Kansas City before running close to the river north of the airport. North of the Route 9 interchange, the freeway runs through a wooded area of the city and passes near Gladstone at the I-29 / US 71 interchange. US 169 passes near Metro North Mall at Barry Road, before becoming a more rural route at Route 152. The Arrowhead Trafficway ends at I-435, with US 169 becoming a four-lane divided expressway to Smithville.

North of Smithville, US 169 becomes a two-lane rural highway, passing through the towns of Trimble and Gower before entering St. Joseph. In St. Joseph, the highway intersects I-29 / US 71 twice and forms part of the Belt Highway in the eastern part of the city. Between I-29 and US 36, US 169 travels through an area that is mostly made up of commercial developments and north of US 36 it travels through areas that feature a mix between commercial and residential. The highway leaves St. Joseph after intersecting I-29 / US 71 a second time. North of St. Joseph, US 169's route is mostly rural. The highway has an overlap with US 136 from Stanberry to near Albany. North of US 136, US 169 travels through Gentry, Grant City, and Irena before exiting the state into Iowa.

== History ==
On May 18, 2018, MoDOT began construction on the Buck O'Neil Bridge, with plans to repair the expansion joints, cable keep replacements and partial scour remediation. The project is expected to last until December at a cost of $7 million. MoDOT eventually plans to completely replace the bridge, with an estimated cost of $150 million; construction would not begin until at least 2022.

== Major intersections ==
All exits are unnumbered.

County	Location	mi	km	Destinations	Notes
Jackson	Kansas City	0.000	0.000	I-70 west / US-24 west / US-40 west / US-169 south	Continuation into Kansas
Jackson	Kansas City	0.600– 0.685	0.966– 1.102	I-35 south – Wichita	Southern end of I-35 overlap; exit 2A
Jackson	Kansas City	0.832	1.339	Beardsley Road	Northbound exit and southbound entrance; exit 2B
Jackson	Kansas City	0.851– 1.096	1.370– 1.764	I-35 north / I-70 east / US 24 east (US 40 east) – St. Louis, Des Moines	Northern end of I-35, I-70, US 24, and US 40 overlaps; US 169 north follows I-70 exit 2C
Missouri River	Kansas City	1.173	1.888	Buck O'Neil Bridge	
Clay	Kansas City	1.781	2.866	Richards Road, Harlem Road – Downtown Airport	Northbound left exit and entrance and southbound exit only
Clay	Kansas City	3.334	5.366	Downtown Airport	Northbound and southbound entrances and southbound exit only
Clay	Kansas City	4.744– 4.916	7.635– 7.912	Route 9 – Riverside, Parkville, North Kansas City	
Clay	Kansas City	5.548	8.929	Briarcliff Parkway	
Clay	Kansas City	6.379	10.266	US 69 (Vivion Road)	Northbound exit and southbound entrance only
Clay	Kansas City	6.523– 6.621	10.498– 10.655	I-29 / US 71 – KCI Airport, St. Joseph	No northbound exit to southbound I-29 / US 71
Clay	Kansas City	7.437	11.969	Englewood Road – Gladstone	
Clay	Kansas City	8.933	14.376	NW 68th Street	
Clay	Kansas City	10.934	17.597	Barry Road	
Clay	Kansas City	11.891	19.137	Route 152 – Liberty, Topeka	
Clay	Kansas City	12.441	20.022	Tiffany Springs Parkway	
Clay	Kansas City	13.941	22.436	Shoal Creek Parkway	
Clay	Kansas City	14.939	24.042	NW Cookingham Drive	
Clay	Kansas City	15.332– 15.354	24.674– 24.710	I-435 – St. Joseph, St. Louis	
Clay	Smithville	19.428	31.266	Route 92 – Platte City, Kearney	
Clay	Smithville	21.199	34.116	US 169 Spur (Bridge Street)	
Clinton	Atchison Township	32.826	52.828	Route 116 – Plattsburg, Rushville	
Buchanan	Tremont Township	41.705	67.118	Route 31 north – Easton	
Buchanan	St. Joseph	50.578	81.397	I-29 / US 71 / I-29 BL begins – Kansas City, Council Bluffs	Southern end of I-29 Business Loop overlap
Buchanan	St. Joseph	51.636	83.100	I-29 BL (Pear Street)	Northern end of I-29 Business Loop overlap
Buchanan	St. Joseph	52.575	84.611	US 36	
Buchanan	St. Joseph	54.646	87.944	I-29 BL south / Route 6 east (Frederick Boulevard)	Southern end of I-29 Business Loop overlap
Buchanan	St. Joseph	56.620	91.121	I-29 BL (Belt Highway)	Northern end of I-29 Business Loop overlap
Buchanan	St. Joseph	57.688– 57.713	92.840– 92.880	I-29 / US 71 – Kansas City, Council Bluffs	
Andrew	No major junctions				
DeKalb	Polk Township	79.148	127.376	Route 31 south / Route E – Clarksdale	
Gentry	King City	84.224	135.545	Route 48 west / Route Z – Berlin, Whitesville	
Gentry	Stanberry	96.132	154.709	US 136 west – Conception Junction	Southern end of US 136 overlap (former route 4)
Gentry	Huggins Township	103.672	166.844	US 136 east / Route H – Darlington, Albany	Northern end of US 136 overlap (former route 1A) former Route 4 continued along US 169 to Iowa state line
Worth	Grant City	121.044	194.801	Route 46 – Grant City, Allendale	
Worth	Fletchall Township	126.907	204.237	US 169 north – Mount Ayr, Des Moines	Continuation into Iowa
1.000 mi = 1.609 km; 1.000 km = 0.621 mi: Concurrency terminus; Incomplete access

== See also ==
U.S. Route 169
Previous state: Oklahoma	Missouri	Next state: Iowa
