= Enyart =

Enyart may refer to

- Enyart, Missouri, an unincorporated community in the United States

== People with the surname ==
- Bill Enyart (1947–2015), American football player
- Bob Enyart (1959–2021), American conservative talk radio host, author and pastor
- Terry Enyart (1950–2007), American baseball pitcher
- William Enyart (born 1949), American politician
