= Howard Township, Gentry County, Missouri =

Township in Gentry County, Missouri, U.S.

Howard Township
- Township
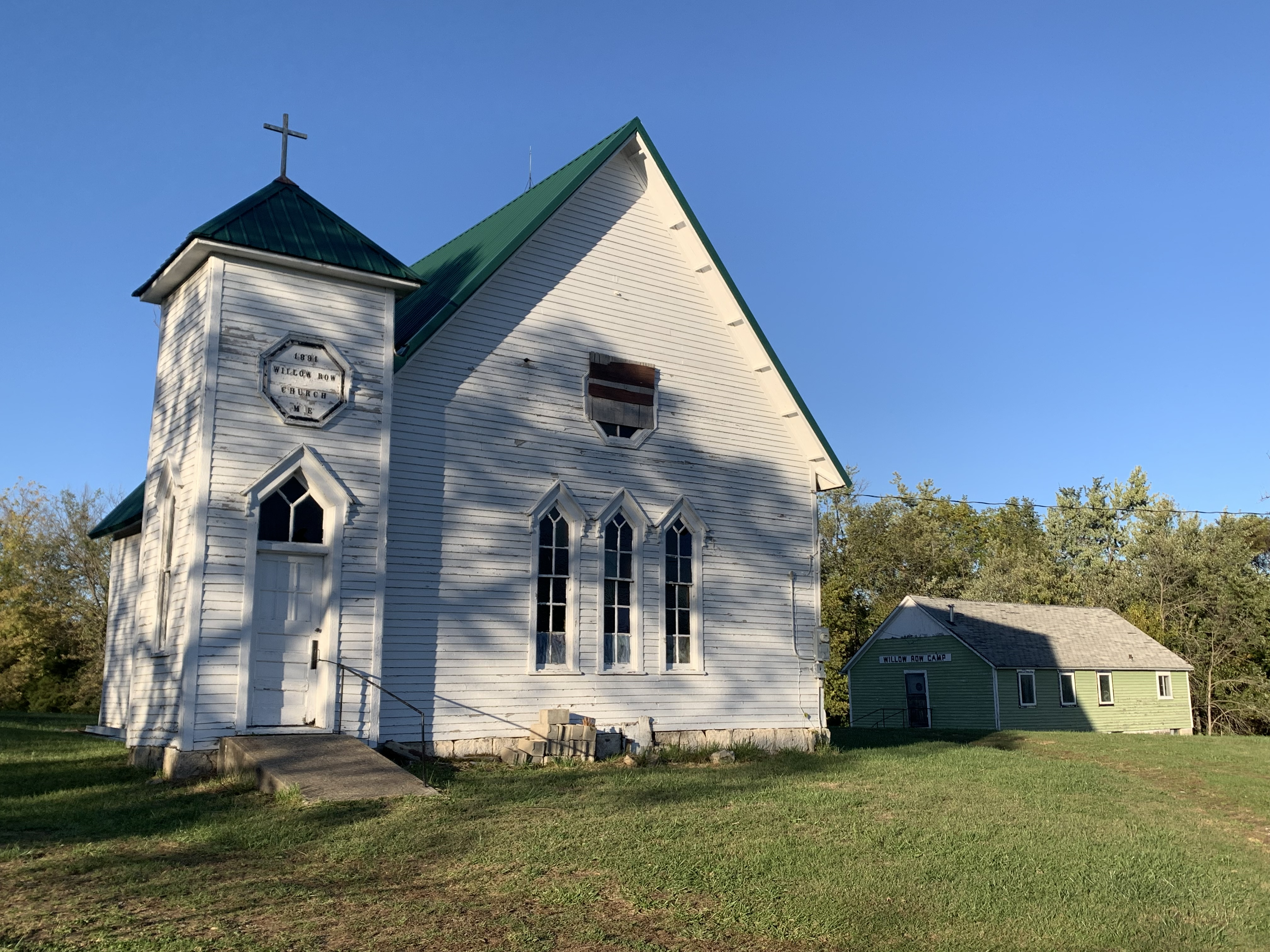
- Willow Row Church and camp in Howard Township

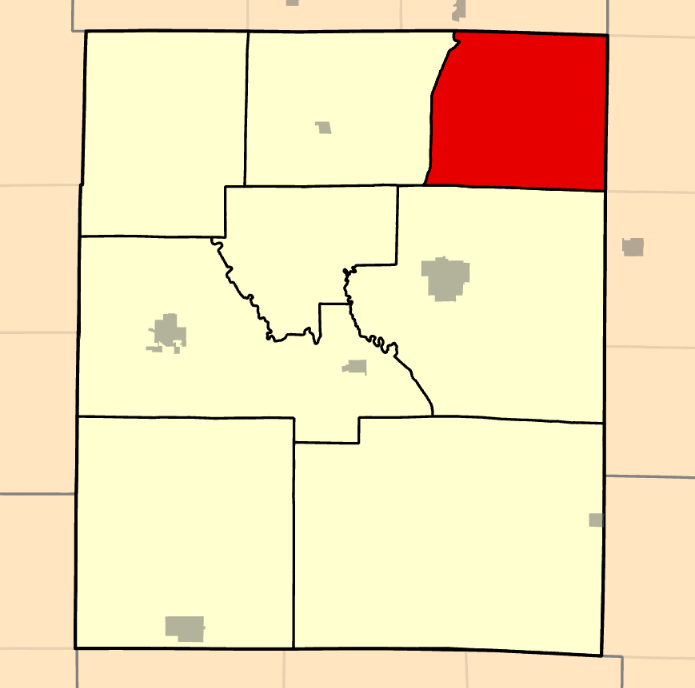
- Coordinates: 40°20′28″N 94°16′40″W
- Country: United States
- State: Missouri
- County: Gentry

Area
  - Total: 39.86 sq mi (103.2 km^{2})
  - Land: 39.86 sq mi (103.2 km^{2})
  - Water: 0.0 sq mi (0 km^{2}) 0.0%
- Elevation: 1,024 ft (312 m)

Population (2020)
  - Total: 120
  - Density: 3/sq mi (1.2/km^{2})
- FIPS code: 29-07533328
- GNIS feature ID: 766667

Howard Township is a township in Gentry County, Missouri, United States. At the 2020 census, its population was 120.

Howard Township bears the name of local pioneers Asa and Samuel Howard.

== Transportation ==
The following highways travel through the township:

- Route C
- Route DD
- Route FF
- Route J
