= Enyart, Missouri =

Extinct hamlet in Missouri, U.S.

Coordinates: 40°21′44″N 94°32′53″W

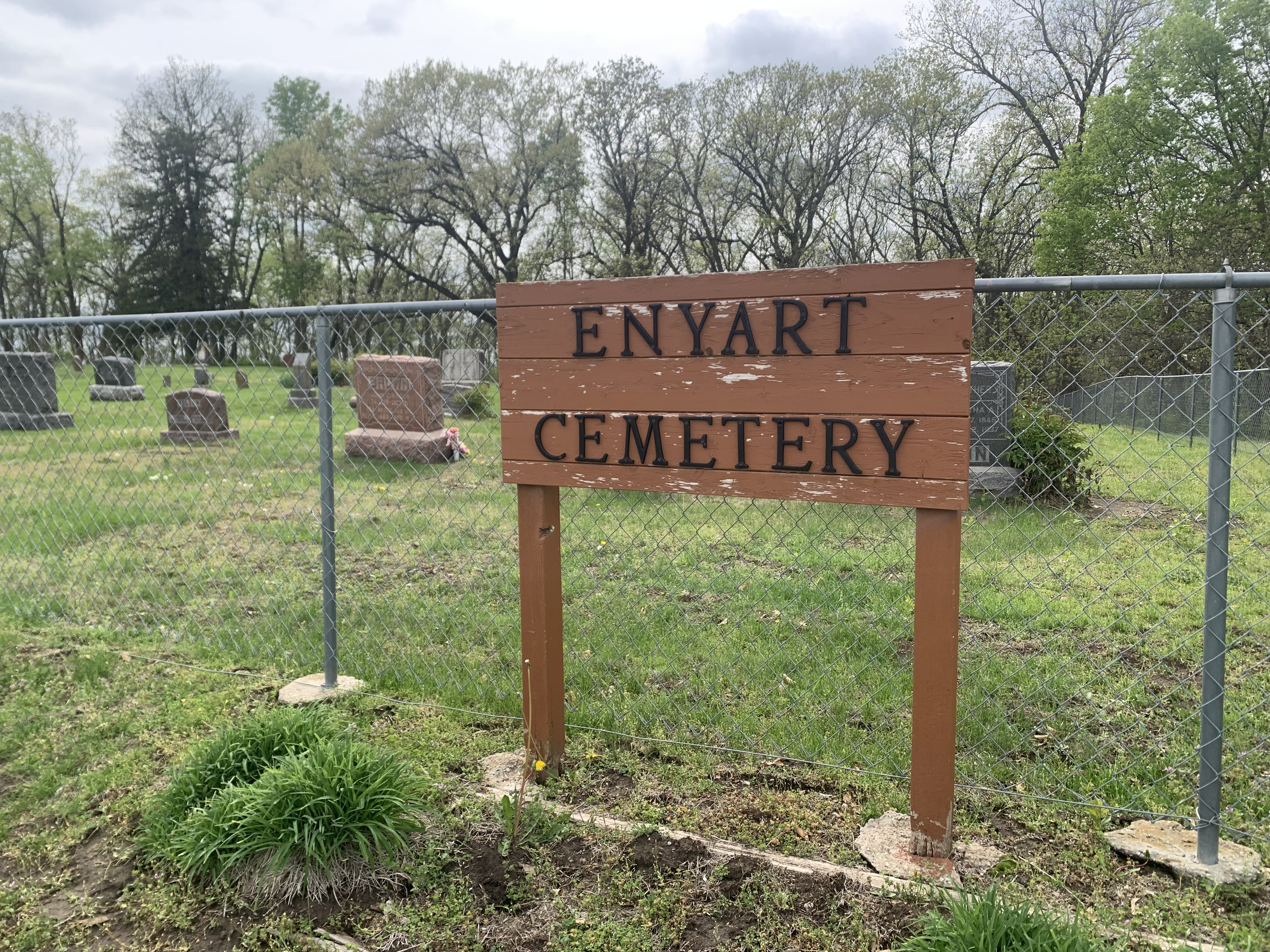
Enyart Cemetery at Enyart, Missouri

Enyart is an unincorporated community in northwest Gentry County, in the U.S. state of Missouri.

The community is on the east bank of the Grand River and Gentry is approximately seven miles to the east-southeast.

== History ==
A post office called Enyart was established in 1879, and remained in operation until 1904. The community has the name of Abraham Enyart, an early settler.
