= Gentry County, Missouri =

County in Missouri, United States

- County
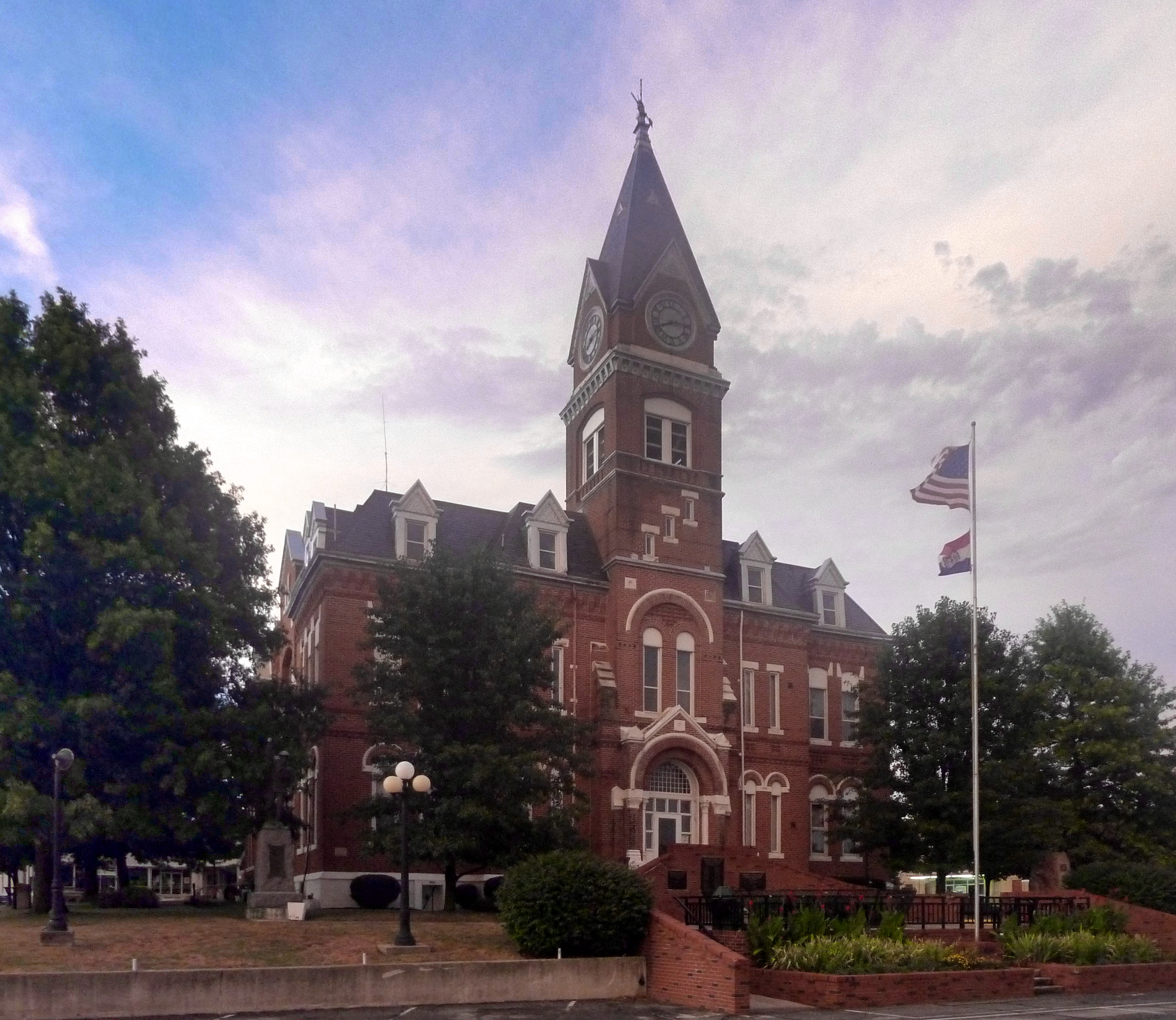
- Gentry County Courthouse in Albany

- Location within the U.S. state of Missouri
- Coordinates: 40°13′N 94°25′W
- Country: United States
- State: Missouri
- Founded: February 14, 1841
- Named for: Richard Gentry
- Seat: Albany
- Largest city: Albany

Area
  - Total: 492 sq mi (1,270 km^{2})
  - Land: 491 sq mi (1,270 km^{2})
  - Water: 0.3 sq mi (0.78 km^{2}) 0.06%

Population (2020)
  - Total: 6,162
  - Estimate (2025): 6,384 ▲
  - Density: 12.5/sq mi (4.85/km^{2})
- Time zone: UTC−6 (Central)
  - Summer (DST): UTC−5 (CDT)
- Congressional district: 6th
- Website: gentrycounty.net

Gentry County is a county located in the northwestern portion of the U.S. state of Missouri. As of the 2020 census, the population was 6,162. Its county seat is Albany. The county was organized February 14, 1841 and named for General Richard Gentry of Boone County, who fell in the Seminole War in 1837.

== Geography ==
According to the U.S. Census Bureau, the county has a total area of 492 square miles (1,270 km^{2}), of which 491 square miles (1,270 km^{2}) is land and 0.3 square miles (0.78 km^{2}) (0.06%) is water.

=== Adjacent counties ===
- Worth County (north)
- Harrison County (east)
- Daviess County (southeast)
- DeKalb County (south)
- Andrew County (southwest)
- Nodaway County (west)

=== Major highways ===
- US 136
- US 169
- Route 48
- Route 85

== Demographics ==
Historical population
Census	Pop.	Note	%±
1850	4,248		—
1860	11,862		179.2%
1870	11,607		−2.1%
1880	17,176		48.0%
1890	19,018		10.7%
1900	20,554		8.1%
1910	16,820		−18.2%
1920	15,634		−7.1%
1930	14,348		−8.2%
1940	13,359		−6.9%
1950	11,036		−17.4%
1960	8,793		−20.3%
1970	8,060		−8.3%
1980	7,887		−2.1%
1990	6,848		−13.2%
2000	6,861		0.2%
2010	6,738		−1.8%
2020	6,162		−8.5%
2025 (est.)	6,384	▲	3.6%
U.S. Decennial Census; 1790–1960 1900–1990; 1990–2000 2010–2015

=== Religion ===
According to the Association of Religion Data Archives County Membership Report (2010), Gentry County is sometimes regarded as being on the northern edge of the Bible Belt, with evangelical Protestantism being the most predominant religion. The most predominant denominations among residents in Gentry County who adhere to a religion are Southern Baptists (46.29%), United Methodists (18.20%), and Disciples of Christ (13.12%).

=== 2020 census ===
As of the 2020 census, the county had a population of 6,162. The median age was 40.3 years, with 25.4% of residents under the age of 18 and 21.4% aged 65 or older. For every 100 females there were 97.2 males, and for every 100 females age 18 and over there were 97.5 males age 18 and over.

There were 2,473 households in the county, of which 28.8% had children under the age of 18 living with them and 23.8% had a female householder with no spouse or partner present. About 30.3% of all households were made up of individuals, and 15.7% had someone living alone who was 65 years of age or older.

There were 2,921 housing units, of which 15.3% were vacant. Among occupied housing units, 74.2% were owner-occupied and 25.8% were renter-occupied. The homeowner vacancy rate was 2.2% and the rental vacancy rate was 12.7%.

0.0% of residents lived in urban areas, while 100.0% lived in rural areas.

=== Racial and ethnic composition ===
Gentry County, Missouri – Racial and ethnic composition Note: the US Census treats Hispanic/Latino as an ethnic category. This table excludes Latinos from the racial categories and assigns them to a separate category. Hispanics/Latinos may be of any race.
Race / Ethnicity (NH = Non-Hispanic)	Pop 1980	Pop 1990	Pop 2000	Pop 2010	Pop 2020	% 1980	% 1990	% 2000	% 2010	% 2020
White alone (NH)	7,835	6,785	6,723	6,604	5,851	99.34%	99.08%	97.99%	98.01%	94.95%
Black or African American alone (NH)	0	6	8	20	15	0.00%	0.09%	0.12%	0.30%	0.24%
Native American or Alaska Native alone (NH)	9	25	21	12	6	0.11%	0.37%	0.31%	0.18%	0.10%
Asian alone (NH)	6	4	11	18	9	0.08%	0.06%	0.16%	0.27%	0.15%
Native Hawaiian or Pacific Islander alone (NH)	x	x	11	0	1	x	x	0.16%	0.00%	0.02%
Other race alone (NH)	0	1	5	3	9	0.00%	0.01%	0.07%	0.04%	0.15%
Mixed race or Multiracial (NH)	x	x	38	45	181	x	x	0.55%	0.67%	2.94%
Hispanic or Latino (any race)	37	27	44	36	90	0.47%	0.39%	0.64%	0.53%	1.46%
Total	7,887	6,848	6,861	6,738	6,162	100.00%	100.00%	100.00%	100.00%	100.00%

=== 2010 census ===
As of the census of 2010, there were 6,738 people, 2,674 households, and 1,789 families residing in the county. The population density was 14 people per square mile (5.4 people/km^{2}). There were 3,209 housing units at an average density of 6 units per square mile (2.3/km^{2}). The racial makeup of the county was 98.38% White, 0.31% Black or African American, 0.27% Asian, 0.19% Native American, 0.16% from other races, and 0.68% from two or more races. 0.53% of the population were Hispanic or Latino of any race.

There were 2,674 households, of which 29.06% had children under the age of 18 living with them, 55.42% were married couples living together, 8.23% had a female householder with no husband present, and 33.10% were non-families. 29.02% of all households were made up of individuals, and 15.07% had someone living alone who was 65 years of age or older. The average household size was 2.45 and the average family size was 3.03.

In the county, the population was spread out, with 24.55% under the age of 18, 7.85% from 18 to 24, 20.67% from 25 to 44, 26.43% from 45 to 64, and 20.50% who were 65 years of age or older. The median age was 42.4 years. For every 100 females there were 93.62 males. For every 100 females age 18 and over, there were 92.43 males.

The median income for a household in the county was $35,556, and the median income for a family was $46,458. Males had a median income of $33,558 versus $25,815 for females. The per capita income for the county was $19,021. About 9.30% of families and 14.90% of the population were below the poverty line, including 24.40% of those under age 18 and 15.00% of those age 65 or over.

== Education ==
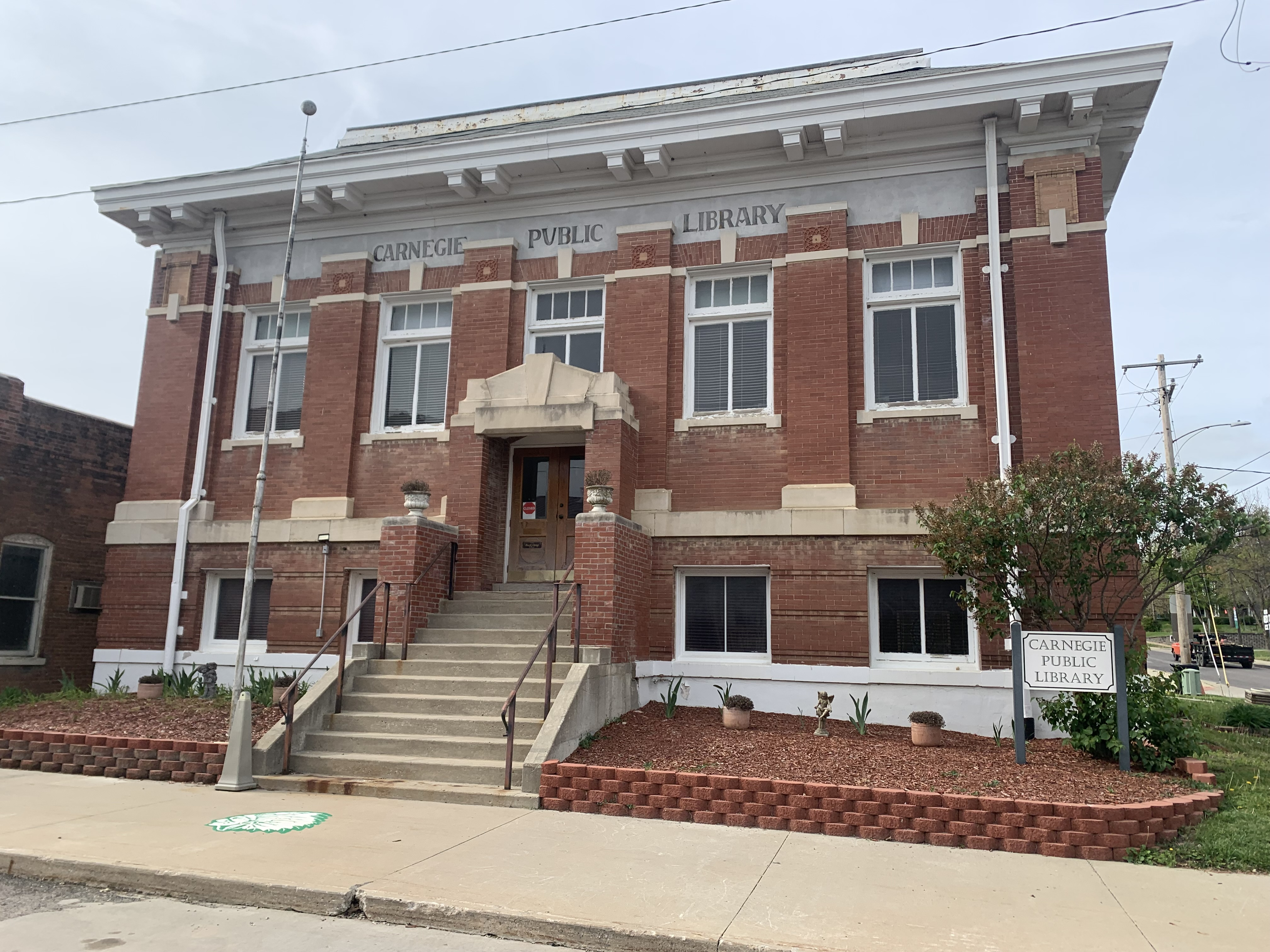
Albany Library

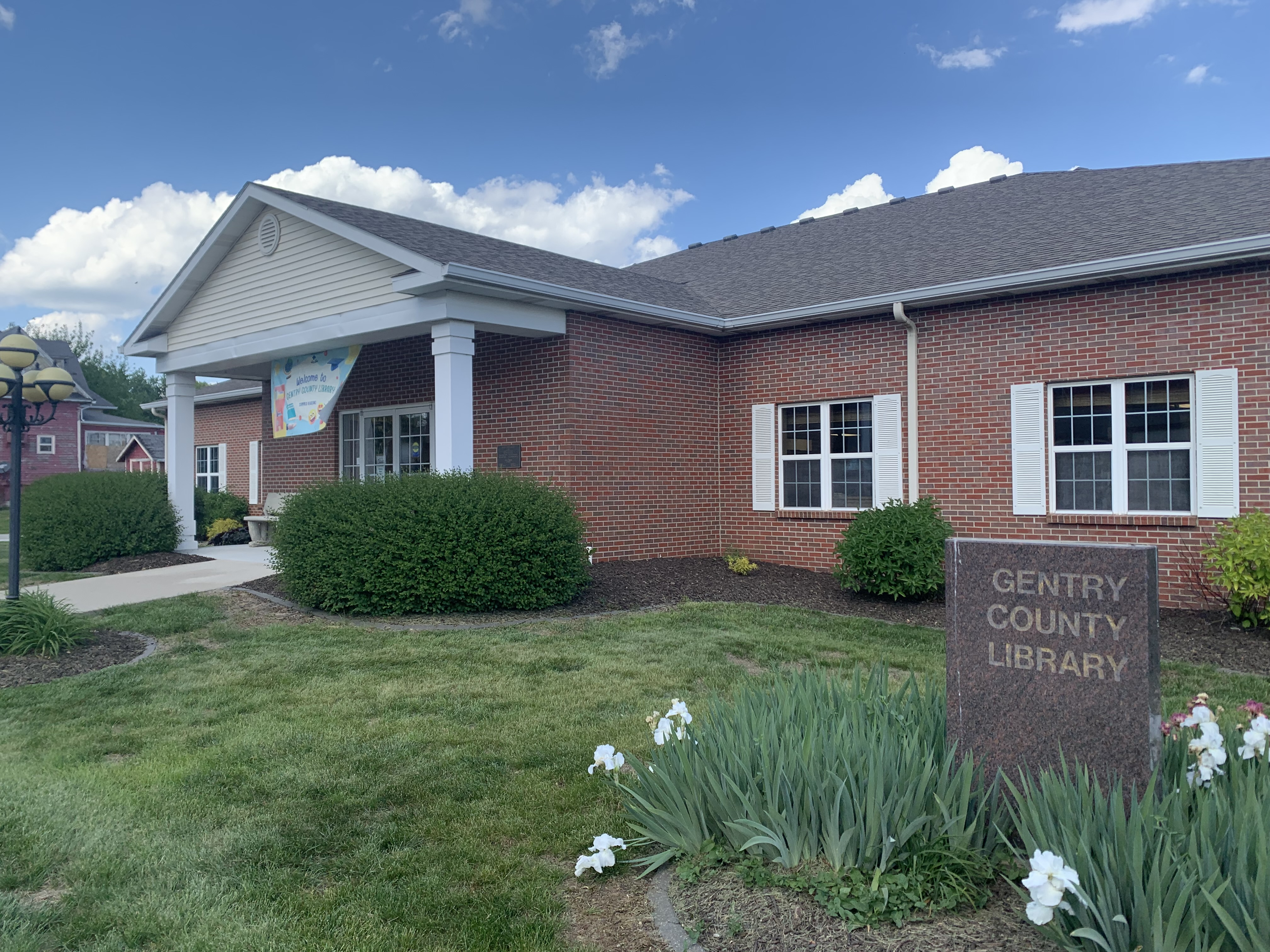
Gentry County Library in Stanberry, Missouri

=== Public schools ===
- Albany R-III School District – Albany
  - Virginia E. George Elementary School (PK-05)
  - Albany Middle School (06-08)
  - Albany High School (09-12)
- King City R-I School District – King City
  - King City Elementary School (PK-06)
  - King City High School (07-12)
- Stanberry R-II School District – Stanberry
  - Stanberry Elementary School (PK-06)
  - Stanberry High School (07-12)

=== Public libraries ===
- Albany Carnegie Public Library - Albany
- Gentry County Library - Stanberry

== Communities ==
=== Cities ===
- Albany (county seat)
- Darlington
- King City
- Stanberry

=== Villages ===
- McFall
- Gentry

=== Unincorporated communities ===
- Alanthus Grove
- Berlin
- Ford City
- Gentryville
- Island City

=== Extinct Hamlets ===
- Carmack
- Ellenorah
- Enyart
- Evona
- Lone Star
- McCurry
- Mount Pleasant
- Siloam Springs

=== Township ===
- Athens
- Bogle
- Cooper
- Howard
- Huggins
- Jackson
- Miller
- Wilson

=== Population ranking ===
The population ranking of the following table is based on the 2020 US census of Andrew County.

† County seat

Rank	Name	Municipal Type	Population
1	Albany †	4th Class City	1,679
2	Stanberry	4th Class City	1,129
3	King City	4th Class City	799
4	McFall	Village	119
5	Darlington	4th Class City	66
6	Gentry	Village	56

== Politics ==
=== Local ===
Political control is divided at the local level in Gentry County. Republicans hold a slim majority of the elected positions in the county.

Gentry County, Missouri

Elected countywide officials
Assessor	Penny Woods	Republican
Circuit Clerk	Janet Parsons	Republican
County Clerk	Carol Reidlinger	Democratic
Collector	Linda Combs	Democratic
Commissioner (presiding)	Mike Sager	Republican
Commissioner (district 1)	Larry B. Wilson	Democratic
Commissioner (district 2)	Gary Carlson	Republican
Coroner	Andrew E. Lindner	Republican
Prosecuting Attorney	Jessica J. Jones	Republican
Public Administrator	Vicky Fish	Republican
Recorder	Janet Parsons	Republican
Sheriff	Tim Davis	Democratic
Treasurer	Linda Combs	Democratic

=== State ===
Past Gubernatorial Elections Results
Year	Republican	Democratic	Third Parties
2024	81.45% 2,639	17.07% 553	1.48% 48
2020	78.85% 2,539	19.60% 631	1.55% 50
2016	64.07% 1,940	33.35% 1,010	2.58% 78
2012	47.92% 1,429	48.89% 1,458	3.19% 95
2008	42.98% 1,400	54.16% 1,764	2.86% 93
2004	57.61% 1,901	41.03% 1,354	1.36% 45
2000	49.24% 1,522	49.27% 1,523	2.12% 46
1996	29.67% 981	68.75% 2,273	1.57% 52

Gentry County is part of the 2nd district in the Missouri House of Representatives, currently held by J. Eggleston (R-Maysville).

Missouri House of Representatives — District 2 — Gentry County (2020)
Party	Candidate	Votes	%	±%
Republican	J. Eggleston	2,570	81.46%	−18.54
Democratic	Mindi Smith	585	18.54%	+18.54

Missouri House of Representatives — District 2 — Gentry County (2018)
Party	Candidate	Votes	%	±%
Republican	J. Eggleston	2,228	100.00%	+0.00

Gentry County is a part of Missouri's 12th District in the Missouri Senate and is currently represented by Dan Hegeman (R-Cosby).

Missouri Senate — District 12 — Gentry County (2018)
Party	Candidate	Votes	%	±%
Republican	Dan Hegeman	1,998	79.76%	−20.24
Democratic	Terry Richard	507	20.24%	+20.24

Missouri Senate — District 12 — Gentry County (2014)
Party	Candidate	Votes	%	±%
Republican	Dan Hegeman	1,322	100.00%	

=== Federal ===
All of Gentry County is included in Missouri's 6th Congressional District and is currently represented by Sam Graves (R-Tarkio) in the U.S. House of Representatives. Graves was elected to an eleventh term in 2020 over Democratic challenger Gena Ross.

U.S. House of Representatives — Missouri's 6th Congressional District — Gentry County (2020)
Party	Candidate	Votes	%	±%
Republican	Sam Graves	2,591	81.25%	+5.35
Democratic	Gena L. Ross	535	16.78%	−3.54
Libertarian	Jim Higgins	63	1.98%	−1.80

U.S. House of Representatives — Missouri’s 6th Congressional District — Gentry County (2018)
Party	Candidate	Votes	%	±%
Republican	Sam Graves	1,927	75.90%	−0.74
Democratic	Henry Robert Martin	516	20.32%	−0.47
Libertarian	Dan Hogan	96	3.78%	+2.28

Gentry County, along with the rest of the state of Missouri, is represented in the U.S. Senate by Josh Hawley (R-Columbia) and Roy Blunt (R-Strafford).

U.S. Senate — Missouri — Gentry County (2018)
Party	Candidate	Votes	%	±%
Republican	Josh Hawley	1,689	66.31%	+24.73
Democratic	Claire McCaskill	734	28.82%	−20.44
Independent	Craig O'Dear	58	2.28%	
Libertarian	Japheth Campbell	44	1.73%	−7.43
Green	Jo Crain	22	0.86%	+0.86

U.S. Senate — Missouri — Gentry County (2016)
Party	Candidate	Votes	%	±%
Republican	Roy Blunt	1,860	61.69%	+20.11
Democratic	Jason Kander	1,025	34.00%	−15.26
Libertarian	Jonathan Dine	68	2.25%	−6.91
Green	Johnathan McFarland	35	1.16%	+1.16
Constitution	Fred Ryman	27	0.90%	+0.90

==== Political culture ====
United States presidential election results for Gentry County, Missouri
Year	Republican		Democratic		Third party(ies)	
Year	No.	%	No.	%	No.	%
1888	1,623	41.97%	2,039	52.73%	205	5.30%
1892	1,607	37.83%	2,003	47.15%	638	15.02%
1896	2,000	40.38%	2,906	58.67%	47	0.95%
1900	2,185	45.44%	2,459	51.13%	165	3.43%
1904	2,060	46.91%	2,157	49.12%	174	3.96%
1908	1,882	44.75%	2,236	53.16%	88	2.09%
1912	1,268	30.33%	2,268	54.25%	645	15.43%
1916	1,823	42.32%	2,404	55.80%	81	1.88%
1920	3,442	49.68%	3,374	48.69%	113	1.63%
1924	3,318	45.94%	3,555	49.22%	349	4.83%
1928	3,506	56.04%	2,735	43.72%	15	0.24%
1932	1,877	33.74%	3,677	66.10%	9	0.16%
1936	3,115	42.64%	4,173	57.12%	18	0.25%
1940	3,446	48.17%	3,689	51.57%	19	0.27%
1944	2,970	49.50%	3,022	50.37%	8	0.13%
1948	2,633	43.56%	3,410	56.42%	1	0.02%
1952	3,429	57.76%	2,508	42.24%	0	0.00%
1956	3,020	53.15%	2,662	46.85%	0	0.00%
1960	2,888	54.21%	2,439	45.79%	0	0.00%
1964	1,677	34.40%	3,198	65.60%	0	0.00%
1968	2,286	48.73%	2,189	46.66%	216	4.60%
1972	2,984	64.50%	1,642	35.50%	0	0.00%
1976	1,772	43.92%	2,249	55.74%	14	0.35%
1980	2,005	51.82%	1,720	44.46%	144	3.72%
1984	2,047	56.13%	1,600	43.87%	0	0.00%
1988	1,554	45.27%	1,872	54.53%	7	0.20%
1992	1,272	34.16%	1,519	40.79%	933	25.05%
1996	1,361	41.36%	1,493	45.37%	437	13.28%
2000	1,771	57.04%	1,271	40.93%	63	2.03%
2004	2,085	62.95%	1,201	36.26%	26	0.79%
2008	1,964	59.66%	1,235	37.52%	93	2.83%
2012	1,988	66.29%	937	31.24%	74	2.47%
2016	2,304	75.71%	605	19.88%	134	4.40%
2020	2,581	79.73%	613	18.94%	43	1.33%
2024	2,651	80.53%	616	18.71%	25	0.76%

At the presidential level, Gentry County is solidly Republican. Donald Trump carried the county easily in 2016 and 2020. Bill Clinton was the last Democratic presidential nominee to carry Gentry County in 1996, and no Democrat has won majority support from Gentry County voters since Michael Dukakis in 1988.

Like most rural areas throughout northwest Missouri, voters in Gentry County generally adhere to socially and culturally conservative principles which tend to influence their Republican leanings. In 2004, Missourians voted on a constitutional amendment to define marriage as the union between a man and a woman—it overwhelmingly won in Gentry County with 79.9% of the vote. The initiative passed the state with 71% support from voters. In 2006, Missourians voted on a constitutional amendment to fund and legalize embryonic stem cell research in the state—it failed in Gentry County with 58.3% voting against the measure. The initiative narrowly passed the state with 51% of support from voters as Missouri became one of the first states in the nation to approve embryonic stem cell research. Despite Gentry County's longstanding tradition of supporting socially conservative platforms, voters in the county have a penchant for advancing populist causes like increasing the minimum wage. In 2006, Missourians voted on a proposition (Proposition B) to increase the minimum wage in the state to $6.50 an hour—it passed Gentry County with 63.3% of the vote. The proposition strongly passed every single county in Missouri with 78.99% voting in favor. (During the same election, voters in five other states also strongly approved increases in the minimum wage.) In 2018, Missourians voted on a proposition (Proposition A) concerning right to work, the outcome of which ultimately reversed the right to work legislation passed in the state the previous year. 61.82% of Gentry County voters cast their ballots to overturn the law.

=== Missouri presidential preference primaries ===
==== 2020 ====
The 2020 presidential primaries for both the Democratic and Republican parties were held in Missouri on March 10. On the Democratic side, former Vice President Joe Biden (D-Delaware) both won statewide and carried Gentry County by a wide margin. He went on to defeat President Donald Trump in the general election.

Missouri Democratic Presidential Primary – Gentry County (2020)
Party	Candidate	Votes	%	±%
Democratic	Joe Biden	291	73.30	
Democratic	Bernie Sanders	83	20.91	
Democratic	Michael Bloomberg	5	1.26	
Democratic	Others/Uncommitted	18	4.53	

Incumbent President Donald Trump (R-Florida) faced only nominal opposition in the primary and won both Gentry County and statewide by large margins.

Missouri Republican Presidential Primary – Gentry County (2020)
Party	Candidate	Votes	%	±%
Republican	Donald Trump	476	97.94	
Republican	Others/Uncommitted	10	2.06	

==== 2016 ====
The 2016 presidential primaries for both the Republican and Democratic parties were held in Missouri on March 15. Businessman Donald Trump (R-New York) narrowly won the state overall and carried a plurality of the vote in Gentry County. He went on to win the presidency.

Missouri Republican Presidential Primary – Daviess County (2016)
Party	Candidate	Votes	%	±%
Republican	Donald Trump	435	40.65	
Republican	Ted Cruz	405	37.85	
Republican	John Kasich	116	10.84	
Republican	Marco Rubio	69	6.45	
Republican	Ben Carson	22	2.06	
Republican	Others/Uncommitted	23	2.15	

On the Democratic side, former Secretary of State Hillary Clinton (D-New York) both won statewide by a small margin but narrowly lost Gentry County to Senator Bernie Sanders (I-Vermont).

Missouri Democratic Presidential Primary – Gentry County (2016)
Party	Candidate	Votes	%	±%
Democratic	Bernie Sanders	176	49.44	
Democratic	Hillary Clinton	171	48.03	
Democratic	Others/Uncommitted	9	2.53	

==== 2012 ====
The 2012 Missouri Republican Presidential Primary's results were nonbinding on the state's national convention delegates. Voters in Gentry County supported former U.S. Senator Rick Santorum (R-Pennsylvania), who finished first in the state at large, but eventually lost the nomination to former Governor Mitt Romney (R-Massachusetts). Delegates to the congressional district and state conventions were chosen at a county caucus, which selected a delegation favoring Santorum. Incumbent President Barack Obama easily won the Missouri Democratic Primary and renomination. He defeated Romney in the general election.

==== 2008 ====
In 2008, the Missouri Republican Presidential Primary was closely contested, with Senator John McCain (R-Arizona) prevailing and eventually winning the nomination.

Missouri Republican Presidential Primary – Gentry County (2008)
Party	Candidate	Votes	%	±%
Republican	John McCain	217	36.90	
Republican	Mike Huckabee	182	30.95	
Republican	Mitt Romney	155	26.36	
Republican	Ron Paul	23	3.91	
Republican	Others/Uncommitted	11	1.87	

Then-Senator Hillary Clinton (D-New York) received more votes than any candidate from either party in Gentry County during the 2008 presidential primary. Despite initial reports that Clinton had won Missouri, Barack Obama (D-Illinois), also a Senator at the time, narrowly defeated her statewide and later became that year's Democratic nominee, going on to win the presidency.

Missouri Democratic Presidential Primary – Gentry County (2008)
Party	Candidate	Votes	%	±%
Democratic	Hillary Clinton	409	53.32	
Democratic	Barack Obama	312	40.68	
Democratic	Others/Uncommitted	46	6.00	

== Miscellaneous ==
On March 5, 2010, a jury awarded seven neighboring farmers $11 million in damages from Premium Standard Farms over odors emanating from a hog farm of 4,300 acres (17 km^{2}) that processes 200,000 hogs near Berlin in Gentry County - the largest such award in history.

== See also ==
- National Register of Historic Places listings in Gentry County, Missouri
