= Avery Kier =

United States Marine Corps general

Avery Raymond Kier
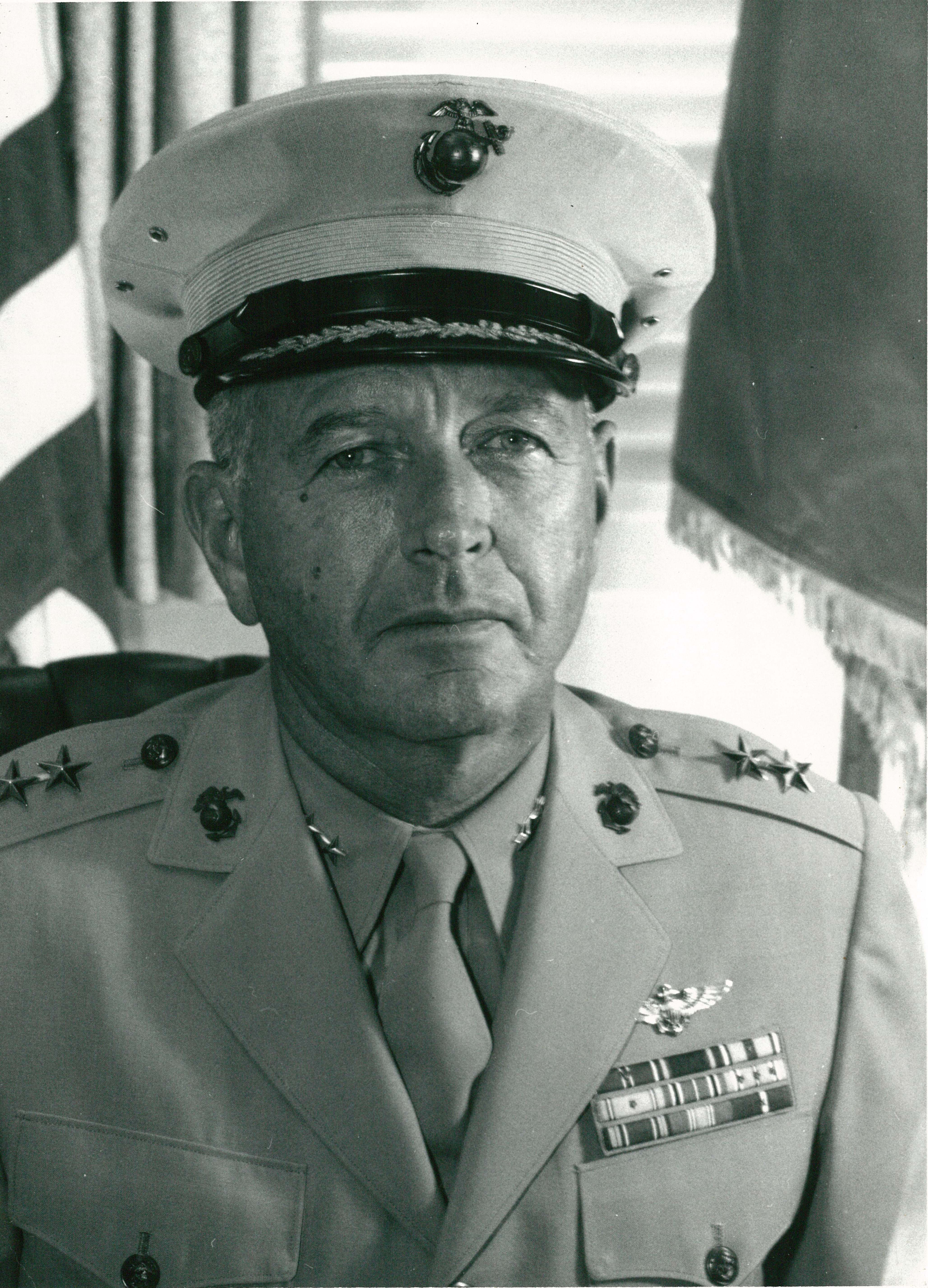
- Major General Avery R. Kier
- Born: February 11, 1905; Gentry, Missouri, U.S.
- Died: August 7, 1987 (aged 82); Laguna Hills, California, U.S.
- Burial place: Pacific View Memorial Park, Corona del Mar, CA
- Military career
- Allegiance: United States
- Branch: United States Marine Corps
- Service years: 1929–1967
- Rank: Major general
- Commands: VMSB-234; LFASCU-1; Marine Aircraft Group 51; Marine Aircraft Group 46; Marine Aircraft Group 33; Marine Corps Air Station Quantico; 1st Marine Brigade; 1st Marine Aircraft Wing; 3rd Marine Aircraft Wing; Aircraft, FMF, PAC; Marine Corps Air Station El Toro; Commander, Marine Corps Air Bases, Western Area
- Conflicts: World War II: Battle of Iwo Jima; Battle of Okinawa
- Awards: Distinguished Service Medal; Bronze Star with "V"

Avery Raymond Kier (February 11, 1905 – August 7, 1987) was a United States Marine Corps aviator and general officer. During World War II he served as the commanding officer of VMSB-234 and towards the end of the war was a pioneer in the development of close air support for ground combat operations serving at both Iwo Jima and Okinawa. Following WW II, Kier served as the commanding officer of numerous Marine aircraft groups, air stations and air wings, with his last assignment being that of deputy commander for Fleet Marine Force, Pacific. He retired from the Marine Corps on 1 March 1967.

== Biography ==
=== Early years ===
Avery Kier was born in Gentry, Missouri, on February 11, 1905. He attended the University of Kansas City from 1923 through 1927, graduating with a Bachelor of Law. He followed this with two more years of schooling at the University of Minnesota, where he attained a master's degree in aeronautical engineering.

=== Aviation reserves; 1930s ===
Kier enlisted in the Marine Corps Reserve on June 4, 1929, at St. Paul, Minnesota, and was immediately assigned to flight school at Naval Air Station Pensacola, Florida. Upon graduation, in June 1930, he was commissioned a second lieutenant and served six months with Aircraft Squadrons, West Coast Expeditionary Forces at Naval Air Station North Island, California. He was released from active duty in January 1931 and proceeded to find employment with the administrative staff of his alma mater, the University of Minnesota. He remained in the reserves and continued to fly during this time through May 1938. He was promoted to the rank of captain in August 1937. In the summer of 1938, Captain Kier served on active duty as a flight instructor at Naval Air Station Minneapolis in connection with the Naval Aviation Cadet Training Program. Following a brief tour at the Naval Reserve Aviation Base in Kansas City, Kier reported to Naval Air Station Pensacola in March 1939, this time as an active duty flight instructor.

=== World War II; 1940s ===
Upon his detachment from Pensacola in May 1940, Captain Kier returned to the Naval Reserve Aviation Base in Minneapolis for duty as the inspector-instructor and commanding officer of the station. He was integrated into the regular Marine Corps in February 1941 and that month he joined Marine Scout Bombing Squadron 2 at Naval Air Station San Diego as the squadron gunnery officer. With the rest of Marine Air Group Two, the squadron deployed to Marine Corps Air Station Ewa, Hawaii, in January 1941. On July 1, 1941, the squadron was re-designated as Marine Scout-Bombing Squadron 231 (VMSB-231). With the prospect of war growing, the squadron was embarked upon the aircraft carrier USS Lexington (CV-2) during the first week of December 1941 and was on its way to Midway Atoll when word of the attack on Pearl Harbor reached the carrier. The Lexington returned to Pearl Harbor on December 10. On December 17 Captain Kier was one of 17 pilots from VMSB-231 who flew their Vought SB2U Vindicator aircraft 1137 miles from Oahu to Midway to bolster the island's defenses. At the time this was the longest mass overwater, single-engine flight on record. In May 1942 he was promoted to major. He remained on Midway until February 9, 1942, when he was rotated back to Marine Corps Air Station Ewa to serve as the operations officer for Marine Aircraft Group 21 (MAG-21). He remained in that role until May 1, 1942, when he was named the commanding officer of VMSB-234, where he served until September 6, 1942. On December 1, 1942, he returned to the States to serve as the assistant chief of staff G-3 for the commanding general, Marine Air West Coast, at Naval Air Station San Diego. He was promoted to lieutenant colonel in April 1943.

LtCol Kier was again ordered overseas in May 1944 to serve as the operations officer and executive officer for Marine Aircraft Group 13 (MAG-13) in the Marshall Islands. He detached from MAG-13 on 15 September 1944 in order to serve as an observer with the Amphibious Group 3 Air Support Control Unit during the Battle of Leyte. On November 1, 1944, he joined Colonel Vernon Megee as a member of the newly formed Provisional Air Support Command, whose role was to organize, train and equip Marine units to duplicate the air control function of the navy but do it ashore. He served with Landing Force Air Support Control Unit 1 (LFASCU-1) at both Iwo Jima and Okinawa. During the Battle of Okinawa, he was the commanding officer of LFASCU-1. For meritorious service on Okinawa from May 15 to June 21, 1945, he was awarded the Bronze Star Medal with Combat "V". He remained with LFASCU-1 through the end of the war and rotated back to the States in August 1945.

Over the course of the next year he would serve as the commanding officer of Marine Aircraft Group 51 (MAG-51), Marine Aircraft Group 46 (MAG-46), and Marine Aircraft Group 33 (MAG-33) during a period of great transition for Marine Aviation as post-war downsizing and reorganization was taking place. In September 1946 he was sent to Marine Corps Base Quantico, Virginia, to attend the Amphibious Warfare School (Senior Course). Upon graduation in June 1947 he was assigned to Naval Air Station Norfolk, Virginia, to serve as the force air officer and assistant chief of staff, G-2, Fleet Marine Forces, Atlantic. In July 1948 he joined the staff of Admiral William H. P. Blandy, the Commander in Chief, Atlantic Fleet as the fleet Marine officer.

=== Commands; 1950s ===
Transferred to the American Embassy in London, England, in August 1950, Colonel Kier began a two-year tour as the assistant naval attache for air. He returned to the United States in August 1952 to serve as the chief of staff for the 3rd Marine Aircraft Wing at Marine Corps Air Station Miami, Florida. In August 1954 he returned to Quantico, Virginia, to become the commanding officer of Marine Corps Air Station Quantico. He served for two years in Quantico before being sent to Marine Corps Air Station El Toro, California, where he served as the assistant chief of staff, G-3, aircraft, Fleet Marine Force, Pacific, prior to his detachment to the Far East in December 1956. In January 1957 he assumed duties as the assistant commander of the 1st Marine Aircraft Wing (1st MAW). While serving in this capacity in April 1957 he was promoted to brigadier general. That same month he was sent to Marine Corps Air Station Kaneohe Bay, Hawaii, and for the next 25 months served as the commanding general (CG) of the 1st Marine Brigade. In July 1959 he would move again, this time to Washington, D.C., where he was assigned as the director of information at Headquarters Marine Corps (HQMC).

=== Leader amongst Marine Aviators; 1960s ===
BGen Kier returned to Japan in April 1960 as the commanding general of 1st MAW. He was promoted to major general in July 1960 and remained as CG until June 1961. For the next four years Kier would remain at MCAS El Toro, CA in various capacities. He would serve as the CG of the 3rd Marine Aircraft Wing (3rd MAW) until June 1962 and then spend the next three years as commanding general, Aircraft, Fleet Marine Force Pacific with the additional duty of commander, Marine Corps Air Bases, Western Area. During his time as CG, Air, FMF PAC Kier oversaw the training and operations of 49 tactical fixed-wing and rotary-wing squadrons dispersed between California, Hawaii, Japan and Okinawa. He also oversaw the fielding of the Short Airfield for Tactical Support (SATS) system and the Marine Tactical Data System (MTDS). SATS allowed Marine A-4s to take off and land on the short expeditionary runway built at Chu Lai Air Base in 1965 when the Marines first entered Vietnam. For his last two years on active duty, MajGen Kier was stationed at Camp H. M. Smith, Hawaii, serving as the deputy commander, Fleet Marine Force, Pacific.

MajGen Kier retired from the Marine Corps on 1 March 1967.

=== In retirement ===
Kier died in Laguna Hills, California, on August 7, 1987, at age 82 and was buried with full military honors in the Pacific View Memorial Park in Corona del Mar, California.

== See also ==
- United States Marine Corps Aviation
- Direct Air Support Center
- List of 1st Marine Aircraft Wing Commanders
