= Lone Star, Missouri =

Unincorporated community in Missouri, U.S.

Coordinates: 40°20′29″N 94°15′12″W

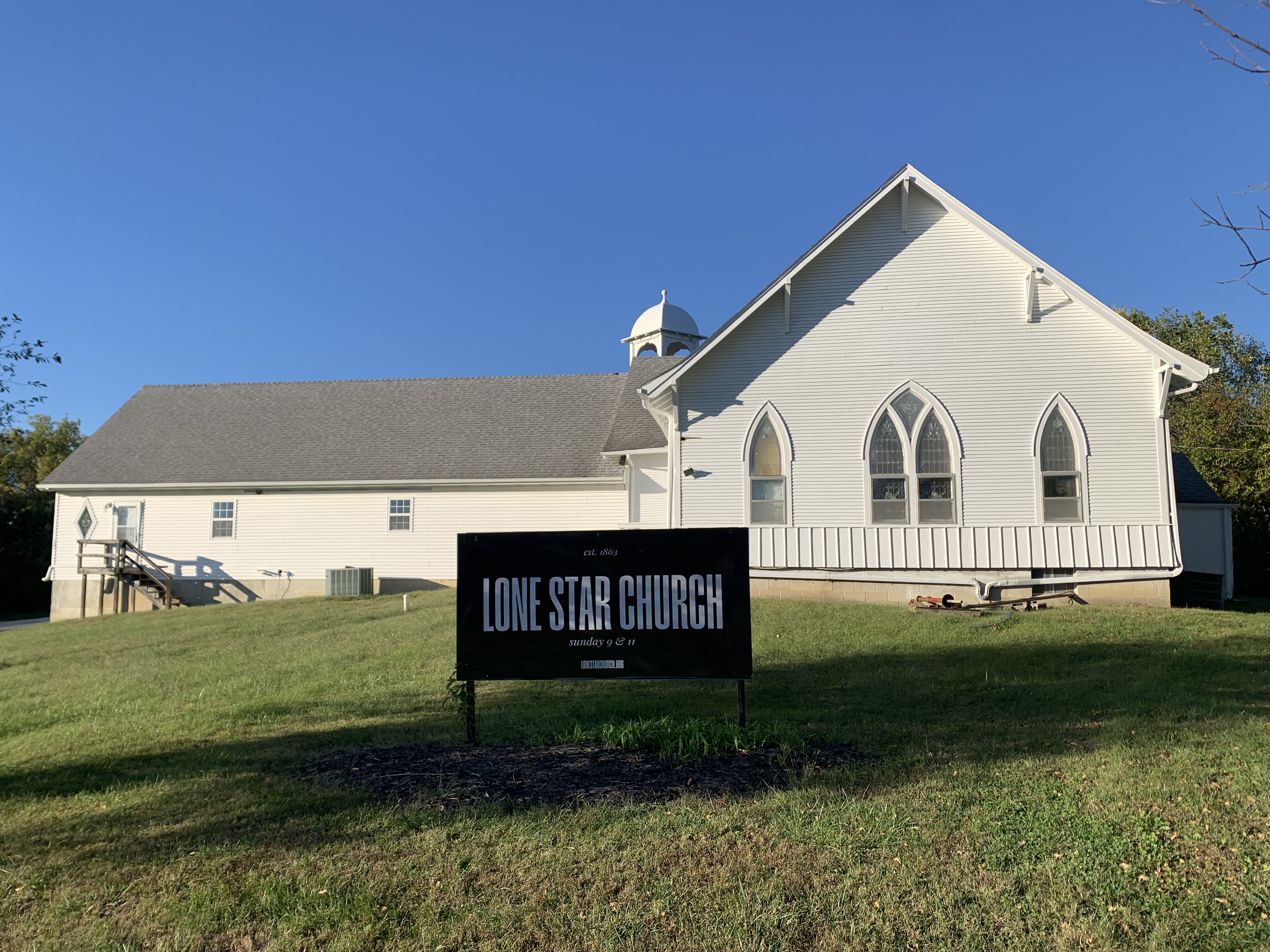
Lone Star Church

Lone Star is an unincorporated community in northeast Gentry County, in the U.S. state of Missouri.

The community is on Missouri Route Y. Siloam Springs is two miles to the north and Martinsville in adjacent Harrison County is approximately five miles to the east.

== History ==
A post office called Lone Star was established in 1873, and remained in operation until 1906. The name may be borrowed from Texas' nickname "Lone Star State".
