= Bogle Township, Gentry County, Missouri =

Township in Gentry County, Missouri, U.S.

Bogle Township
- Township
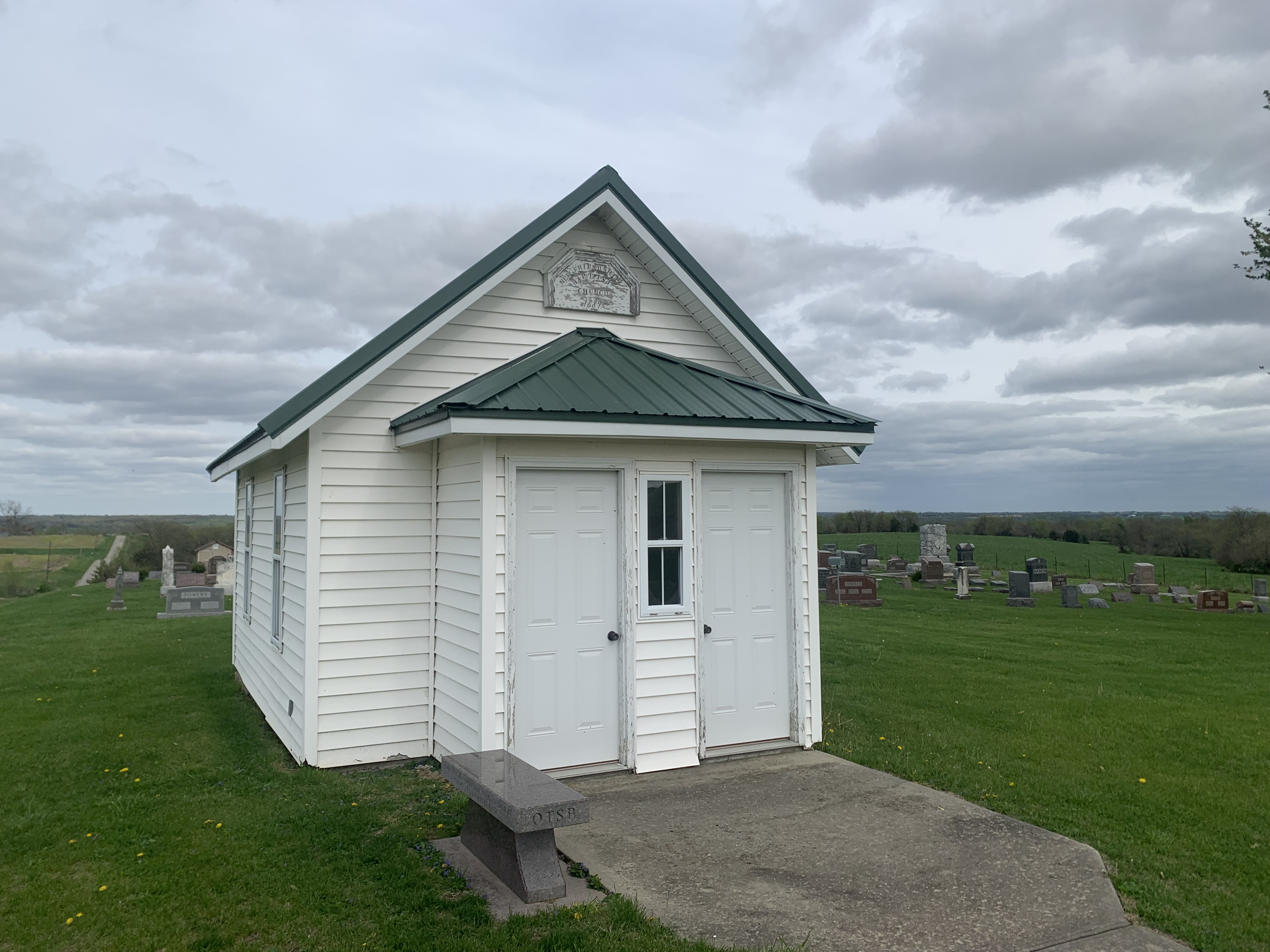
- New Friendship Baptist Church and Cemetery in Bogle Township

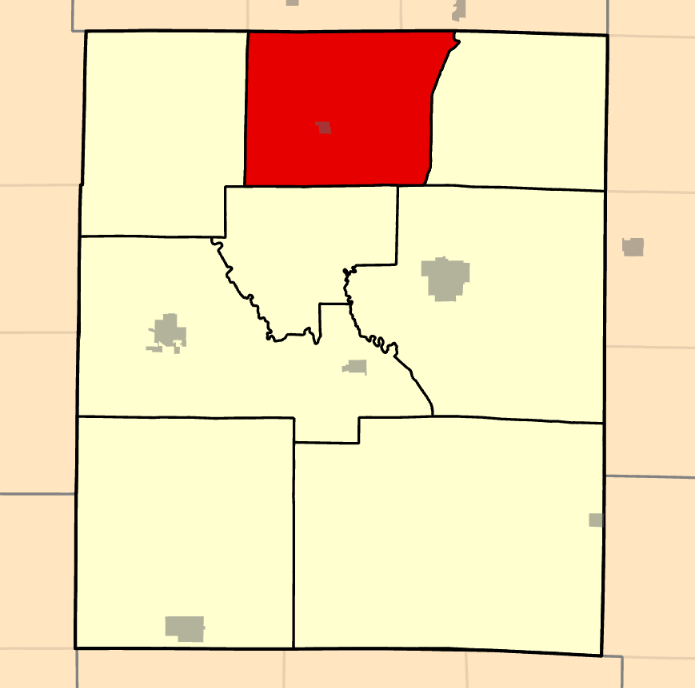
- Coordinates: 40°20′39″N 94°24′37″W
- Country: United States
- State: Missouri
- County: Gentry

Area
  - Total: 44.31 sq mi (114.8 km^{2})
  - Land: 44.31 sq mi (114.8 km^{2})
  - Water: 0.0 sq mi (0 km^{2}) 0.0%
- Elevation: 879 ft (268 m)

Population (2020)
  - Total: 176
  - Density: 4/sq mi (1.5/km^{2})
- FIPS code: 29-07506868
- GNIS feature ID: 766665

Bogle Township is a township in Gentry County, Missouri, United States. At the 2020 census, its population was 176.

Bogle Township was named after a pioneer citizen.

== Transportation ==
The following highways travel through the township:

- U.S. Route 169
- Route F
- Route N
- Route O
- Route YY
