= Wilson Township, Gentry County, Missouri =

Township in Gentry County, Missouri, U.S.

Wilson Township
- Township
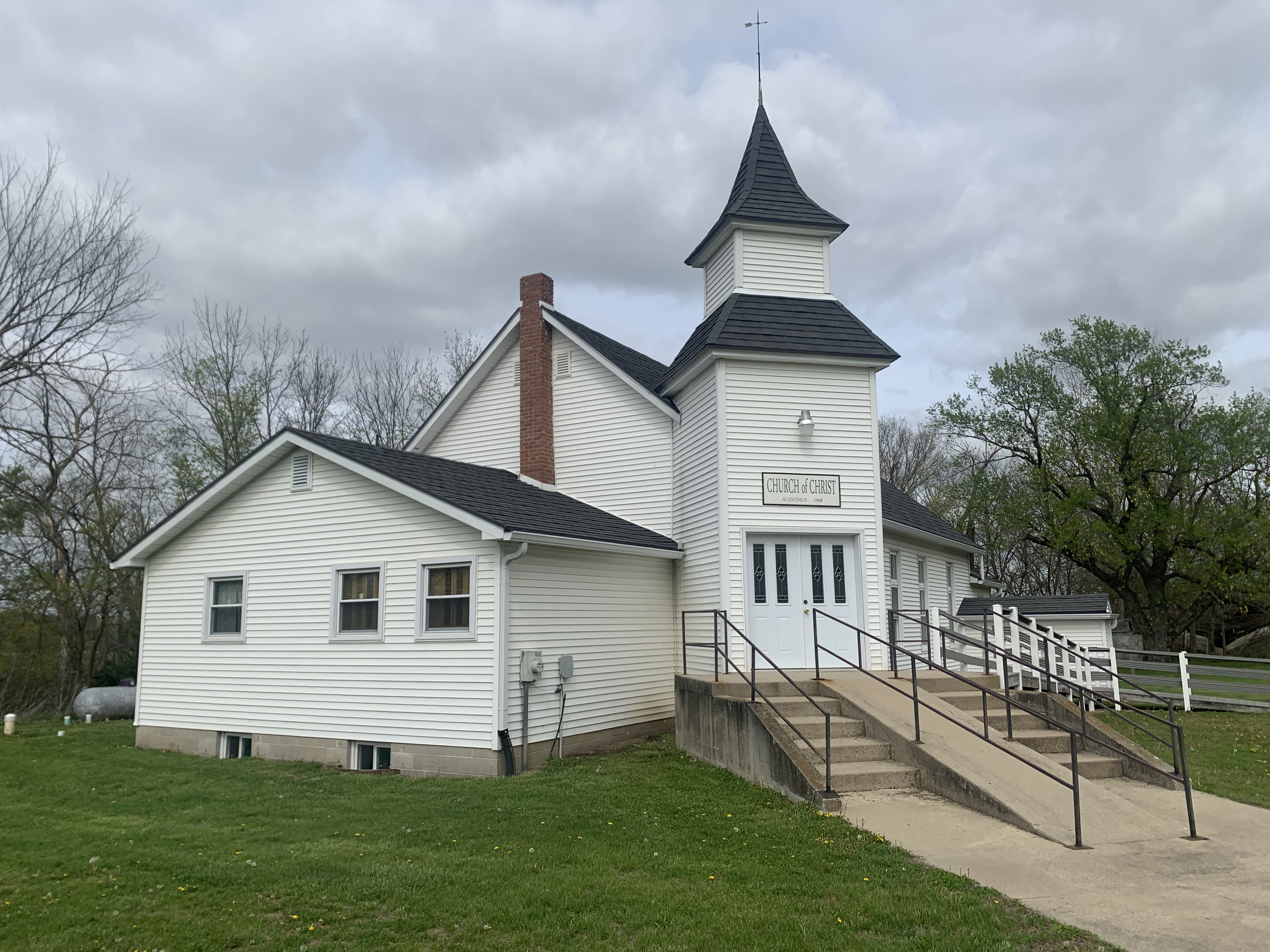
- Alanthus Church of Christ in Alanthus Grove

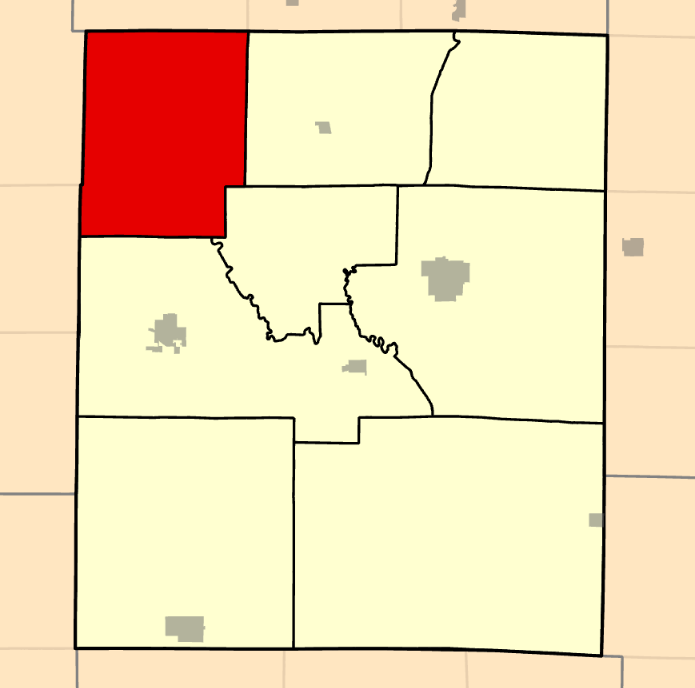
- Coordinates: 40°19′48″N 94°32′32″W
- Country: United States
- State: Missouri
- County: Gentry

Area
  - Total: 49.08 sq mi (127.1 km^{2})
  - Land: 49.08 sq mi (127.1 km^{2})
  - Water: 0.0 sq mi (0 km^{2}) 0.0%
- Elevation: 876 ft (267 m)

Population (2020)
  - Total: 345
  - Density: 7/sq mi (2.7/km^{2})
- FIPS code: 29-07580188
- GNIS feature ID: 766671

Wilson Township is a township in Gentry County, Missouri, United States. At the 2020 census, its population was 345.

Wilson Township bears the name of an early settler.

== Transportation ==
The following highways travel through the township:

- Route AF
- Route B
- Route O
- Route U
- Route W
