= Huggins Township, Gentry County, Missouri =

Township in Missouri, U.S.

Huggins Township
- Township
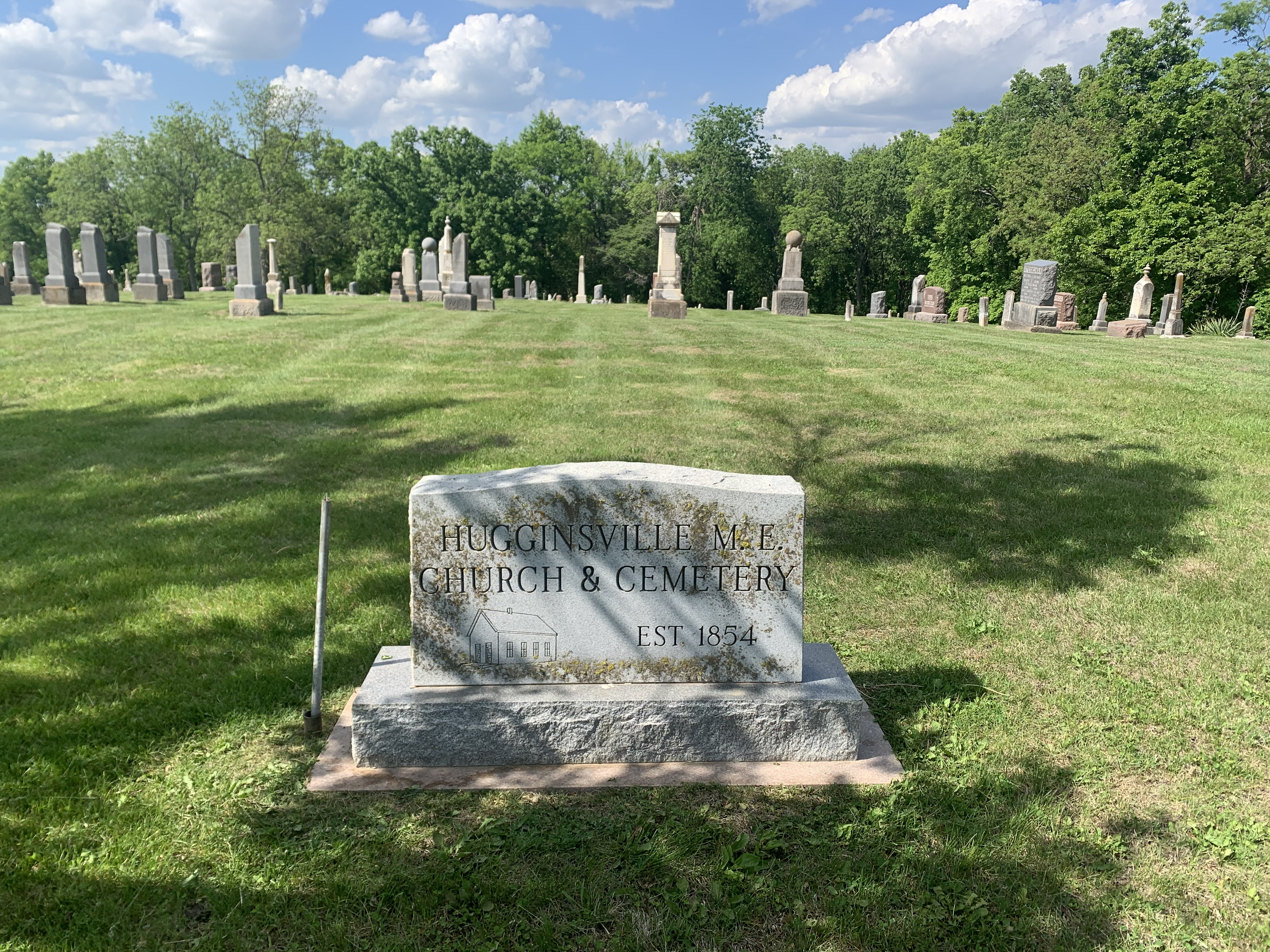
- Hugginsville Cemetery in north Huggins Township

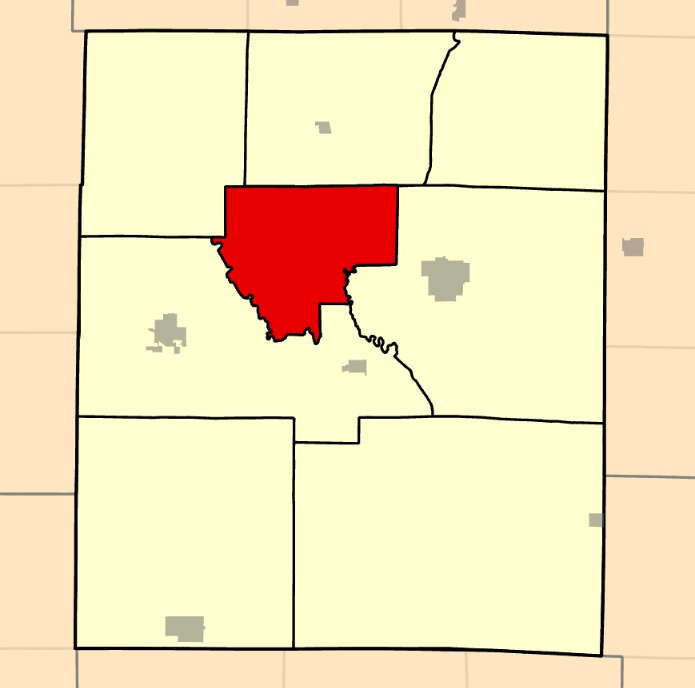
- Coordinates: 40°15′55″N 94°26′15″W
- Country: United States
- State: Missouri
- County: Gentry

Area
  - Total: 30.11 sq mi (78.0 km^{2})
  - Land: 30.11 sq mi (78.0 km^{2})
  - Water: 0.0 sq mi (0 km^{2}) 0.0%
- Elevation: 961 ft (293 m)

Population (2020)
  - Total: 129
  - Density: 4.3/sq mi (1.7/km^{2})
- FIPS code: 29-07533598
- GNIS feature ID: 766668

Huggins Township is a township in Gentry County, Missouri, United States. At the 2020 census, its population was 129.

Huggins Township has the name of John Huggins, an early settler.

== Hamlets ==
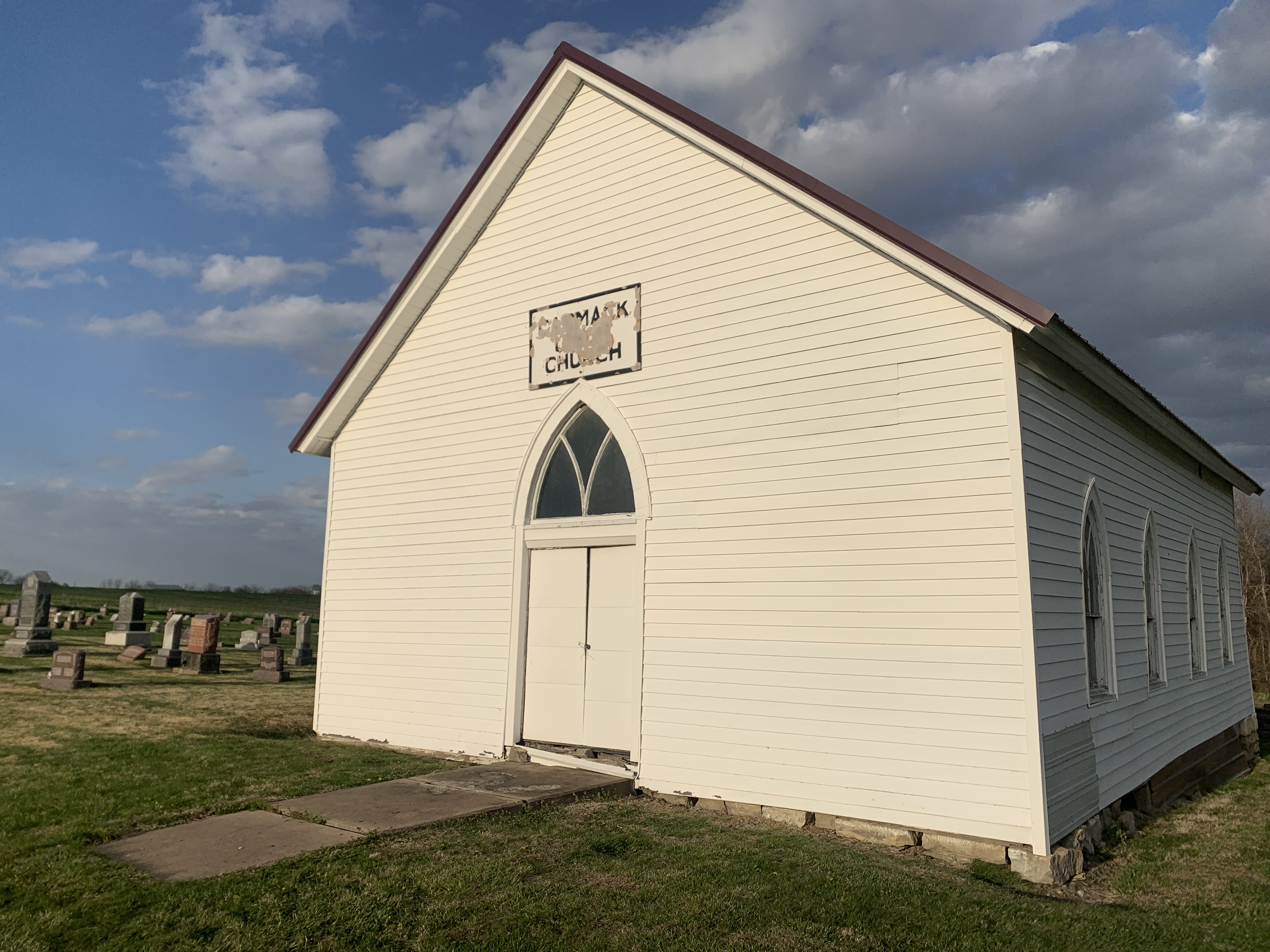
Carmack Union Church at Carmack, Missouri

Carmack is an extinct hamlet in Huggins Township, about 5 miles west of Albany and 6 miles northeast of Stanberry. The name Carmack comes from the name of a prominent family from the area. There is no record of a post office at Carmack. A church and church cemetery remain where the hamlet site was. The site is also at the junction between US-136 and US-169.

== Transportation ==
The following highways travel through the township:

- U.S. Route 136
- U.S. Route 169
- Route F
- Route H
- Route N
