= Miller Township, Gentry County, Missouri =

Township in Gentry County, Missouri, U.S.

Miller Township
- Township
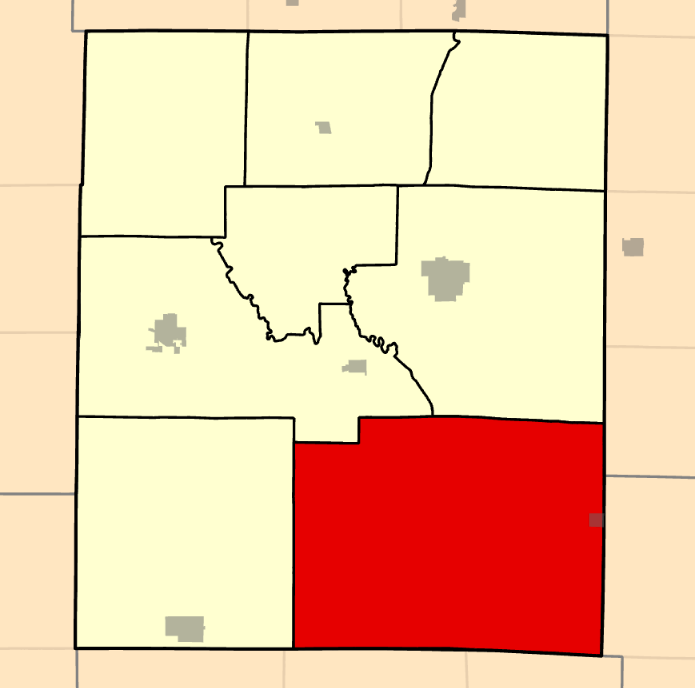
- Coordinates: 40°06′11″N 94°19′34″W
- Country: United States
- State: Missouri
- County: Gentry

Area
  - Total: 106.47 sq mi (275.8 km^{2})
  - Land: 106.43 sq mi (275.7 km^{2})
  - Water: 0.04 sq mi (0.10 km^{2}) 0.04%
- Elevation: 814 ft (248 m)

Population (2020)
  - Total: 452
  - Density: 4.2/sq mi (1.6/km^{2})
- FIPS code: 29-07548224
- GNIS feature ID: 766670

Miller Township is a township in Gentry County, Missouri, United States. At the 2020 census, its population was 452. The township's seat is located in the hamlet of Gentryville.

Miller Township has the name of Isaac Miller, an early settler.

== Transportation ==
The following highways travel through the township:

- Route A
- Route D
- Route EE
- Route H
- Route T
- Route V
- Route Z
- Route ZZ
