= Gentry, Missouri =

Village in Gentry County, Missouri, United States

- Village
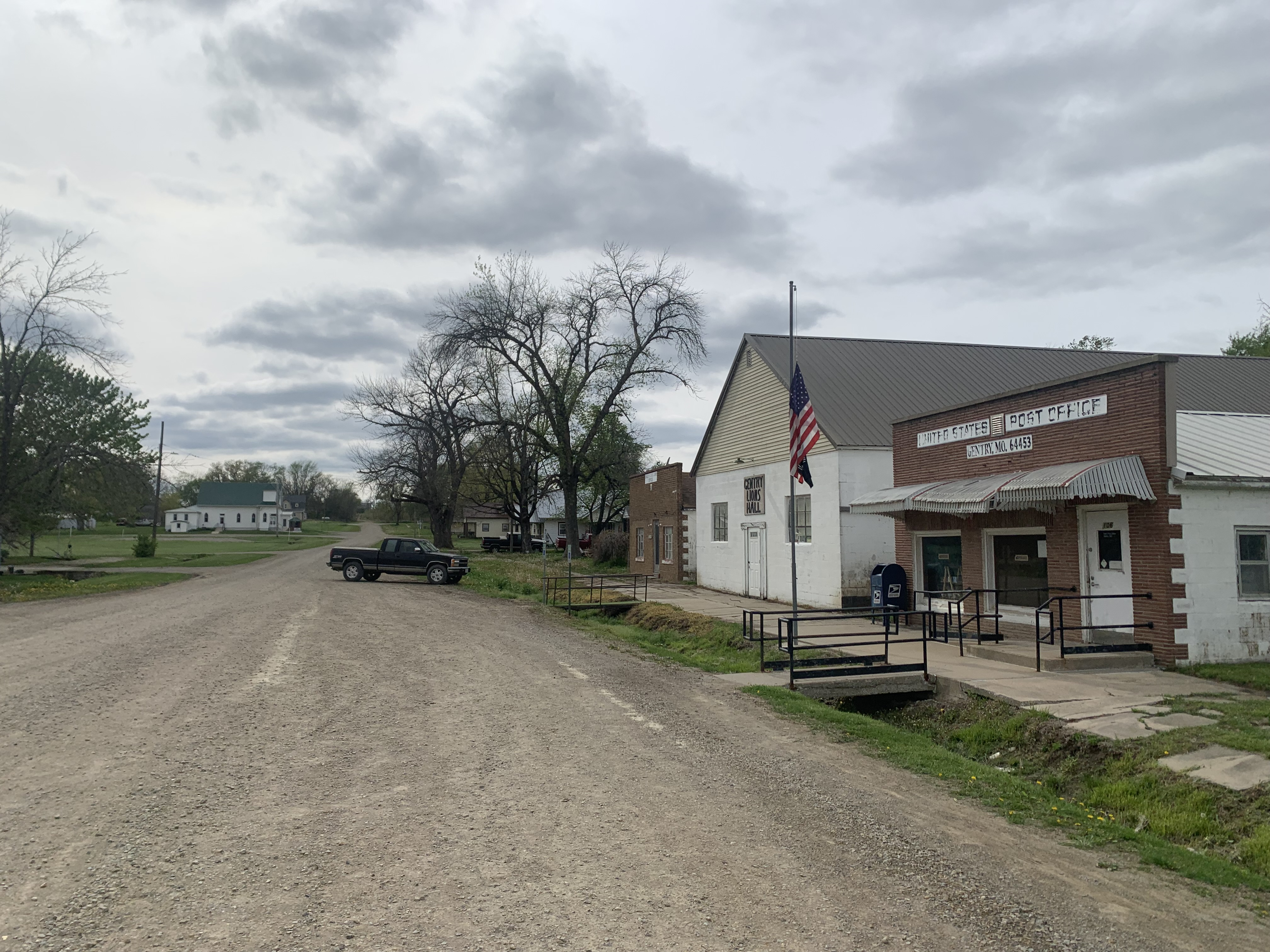
- Gentry Main Street, April 2025

- Location of Gentry, Missouri
- Coordinates: 40°19′57″N 94°25′25″W
- Country: United States
- State: Missouri
- County: Gentry
- Township: Bogle

Area
  - Total: 0.23 sq mi (0.60 km^{2})
  - Land: 0.23 sq mi (0.60 km^{2})
  - Water: 0 sq mi (0.00 km^{2})
- Elevation: 902 ft (275 m)

Population (2020)
  - Total: 56
  - Density: 243.5/sq mi (94.03/km^{2})
- Time zone: UTC-6 (Central (CST))
  - Summer (DST): UTC-5 (CDT)
- ZIP code: 64453
- Area code: 660
- FIPS code: 29-26776
- GNIS feature ID: 2398951

Gentry is a village in Gentry County, Missouri, United States. The population was 56 at the 2020 census.

== History ==
Gentry was platted in 1899 by the railroad. Gentry was named from Gentry County, which was named for Richard Gentry, a hero of the Seminole Wars.

== Geography ==
Gentry is located on the west bank of the Middle Fork of the Grand River.

According to the United States Census Bureau, the village has a total area of 0.23 square miles (0.60 km^{2}), all land.

== Demographics ==
Historical population
Census	Pop.	Note	%±
1850	126		—
1860	160		27.0%
1870	255		59.4%
1880	298		16.9%
1890	223		−25.2%
1900	147		−34.1%
1910	226		53.7%
1920	217		−4.0%
1930	202		−6.9%
1940	196		−3.0%
1950	159		−18.9%
1960	98		−38.4%
1970	143		45.9%
1980	126		−11.9%
1990	95		−24.6%
2000	101		6.3%
2010	72		−28.7%
2020	56		−22.2%
U.S. Decennial Census

=== 2010 census ===
As of the census of 2010, there were 72 people, 29 households, and 18 families living in the village. The population density was 313.0 inhabitants per square mile (120.8/km^{2}). There were 35 housing units at an average density of 152.2 per square mile (58.8/km^{2}). The racial makeup of the village was 98.6% White and 1.4% from two or more races.

There were 29 households, of which 34.5% had children under the age of 18 living with them, 51.7% were married couples living together, 10.3% had a female householder with no husband present, and 37.9% were non-families. 34.5% of all households were made up of individuals. The average household size was 2.48 and the average family size was 3.17.

The median age in the village was 36.3 years. 27.8% of residents were under the age of 18; 9.7% were between the ages of 18 and 24; 26.4% were from 25 to 44; 26.4% were from 45 to 64; and 9.7% were 65 years of age or older. The gender makeup of the village was 50.0% male and 50.0% female.

=== 2000 census ===
As of the census of 2000, there were 101 people, 34 households, and 22 families living in the village. The population density was 445.7 inhabitants per square mile (172.1/km^{2}). There were 44 housing units at an average density of 194.2 per square mile (75.0/km^{2}). The racial makeup of the village was 100.00% White.

There were 34 households, out of which 38.2% had children under the age of 18 living with them, 41.2% were married couples living together, 17.6% had a female householder with no husband present, and 32.4% were non-families. 32.4% of all households were made up of individuals, and 5.9% had someone living alone who was 65 years of age or older. The average household size was 2.97 and the average family size was 3.78.

In the village, the population was spread out, with 44.6% under the age of 18, 5.0% from 18 to 24, 27.7% from 25 to 44, 14.9% from 45 to 64, and 7.9% who were 65 years of age or older. The median age was 26 years. For every 100 females, there were 106.1 males. For every 100 females age 18 and over, there were 107.4 males.

The median income for a household in the village was $20,000, and the median income for a family was $28,750. Males had a median income of $28,750 versus $15,625 for females. The per capita income for the village was $8,501. There were 25.0% of families and 17.1% of the population living below the poverty line, including 10.4% of under eighteens and none of those over 64.

== Notable people ==
- Avery Kier
- Homer Summa

== See also ==
- List of cities in Missouri
