= Stanberry, Missouri =

City in Missouri, U.S.

- City
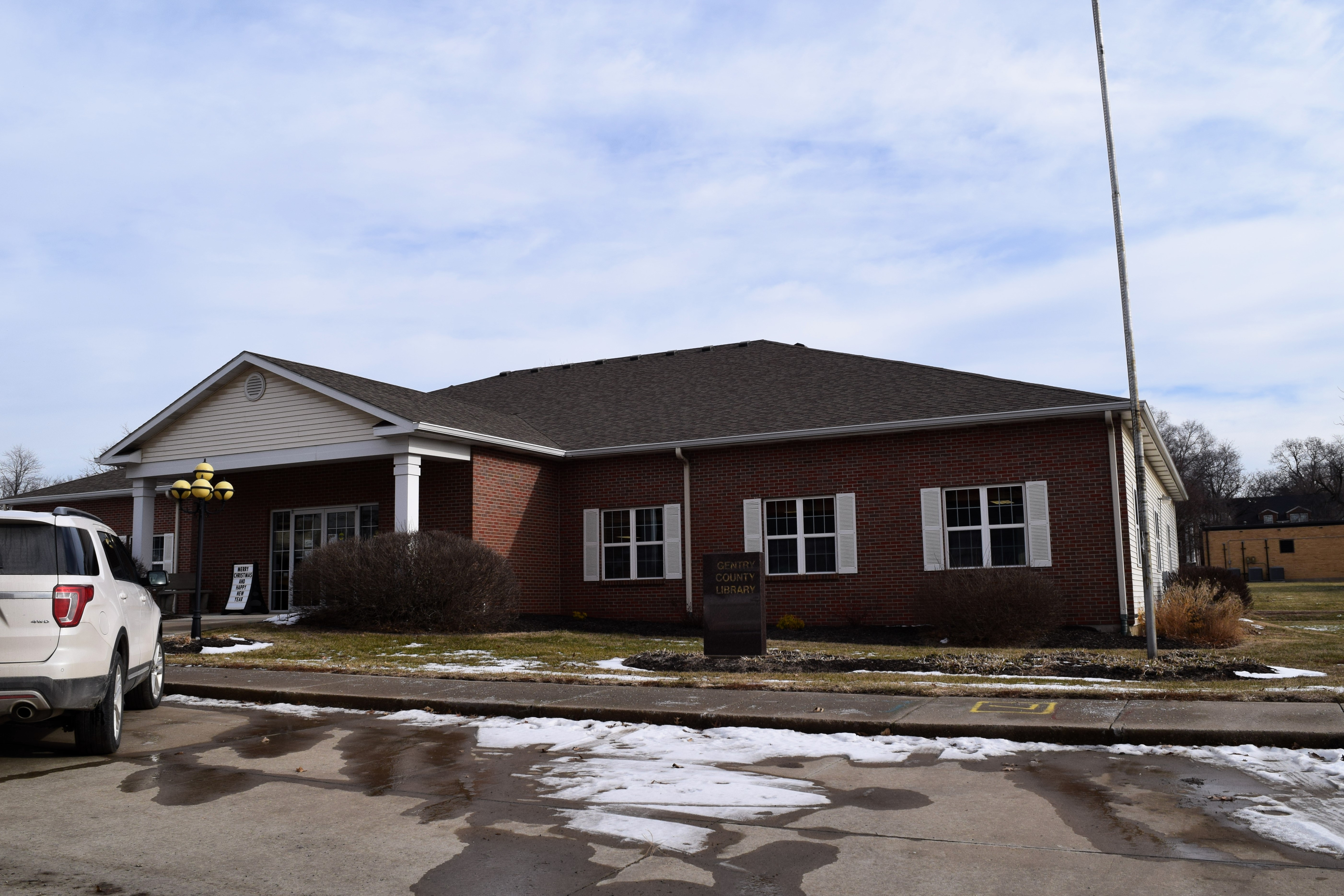
- Gentry County Library in Stanberry

- Location of Stanberry, Missouri
- Coordinates: 40°13′00″N 94°32′17″W
- Country: United States
- State: Missouri
- County: Gentry
- Township: Cooper

Area
  - Total: 1.40 sq mi (3.63 km^{2})
  - Land: 1.40 sq mi (3.63 km^{2})
  - Water: 0 sq mi (0.00 km^{2})
- Elevation: 948 ft (289 m)

Population (2020)
  - Total: 1,129
  - Density: 804.7/sq mi (310.71/km^{2})
- Time zone: UTC-6 (Central (CST))
  - Summer (DST): UTC-5 (CDT)
- ZIP code: 64489
- Area code: 660
- FIPS code: 29-70270
- GNIS feature ID: 2395949
- Website: www.stanberrymo.com

Stanberry is a city in Gentry County, Missouri, United States. The population was 1,129 at the 2020 census.

== History ==
Stanberry was platted in 1879 when the Wabash Railroad was extended to that point. The community was named for J. J. Stanberry, original owner of the town site. A post office called Stanberry has been in operation since 1879.

== Geography ==
Stanberry is located in western Gentry County at the intersection of US Routes 136 and 169. Albany is approximately eleven miles to the east and King City is about eleven miles to the south. Wildcat Creek flows past the south side of the community.

According to the United States Census Bureau, the city has a total area of 1.40 square miles (3.63 km^{2}), all land or 896 acres.

== Demographics ==
Historical population
Census	Pop.	Note	%±
1880	1,207		—
1890	2,035		68.6%
1900	2,654		30.4%
1910	2,121		−20.1%
1920	1,864		−12.1%
1930	2,029		8.9%
1940	1,893		−6.7%
1950	1,651		−12.8%
1960	1,409		−14.7%
1970	1,479		5.0%
1980	1,387		−6.2%
1990	1,310		−5.6%
2000	1,243		−5.1%
2010	1,185		−4.7%
2020	1,129		−4.7%
U.S. Decennial Census

=== 2010 census ===
As of the census of 2010, there were 1,185 people, 477 households, and 304 families living in the city. The population density was 846.4 inhabitants per square mile (326.8/km^{2}). There were 573 housing units at an average density of 409.3 per square mile (158.0/km^{2}). The racial makeup of the city was 99.1% White, 0.2% African American, 0.2% Native American, 0.2% from other races, and 0.4% from two or more races. Hispanic or Latino of any race were 0.9% of the population.

There were 477 households, of which 28.7% had children under the age of 18 living with them, 52.2% were married couples living together, 9.4% had a female householder with no husband present, 2.1% had a male householder with no wife present, and 36.3% were non-families. 32.3% of all households were made up of individuals, and 19.1% had someone living alone who was 65 years of age or older. The average household size was 2.35 and the average family size was 2.98.

The median age in the city was 42.7 years. 24.2% of residents were under the age of 18; 8.1% were between the ages of 18 and 24; 20.5% were from 25 to 44; 22.4% were from 45 to 64; and 24.8% were 65 years of age or older. The gender makeup of the city was 47.2% male and 52.8% female.

=== 2000 census ===
As of the census of 2000, there were 1,243 people, 508 households, and 342 families living in the city. The population density was 942.5 inhabitants per square mile (363.9/km^{2}). There were 589 housing units at an average density of 446.6 per square mile (172.4/km^{2}). The racial makeup of the city was 98.47% White, 0.08% African American, 0.56% Native American, 0.08% Asian, 0.40% from other races, and 0.40% from two or more races. Hispanic or Latino of any race were 0.16% of the population.

There were 508 households, out of which 28.5% had children under the age of 18 living with them, 55.9% were married couples living together, 9.1% had a female householder with no husband present, and 32.5% were non-families. 31.3% of all households were made up of individuals, and 21.3% had someone living alone who was 65 years of age or older. The average household size was 2.32 and the average family size was 2.91.

In the city the population was spread out, with 22.8% under the age of 18, 7.9% from 18 to 24, 21.5% from 25 to 44, 20.8% from 45 to 64, and 27.1% who were 65 years of age or older. The median age was 43 years. For every 100 females, there were 87.5 males. For every 100 females age 18 and over, there were 78.8 males.

The median income for a household in the city was $30,417, and the median income for a family was $38,684. Males had a median income of $25,774 versus $18,750 for females. The per capita income for the city was $13,736. About 6.3% of families and 8.8% of the population were below the poverty line, including 8.1% of those under age 18 and 11.3% of those age 65 or over.

== Education ==
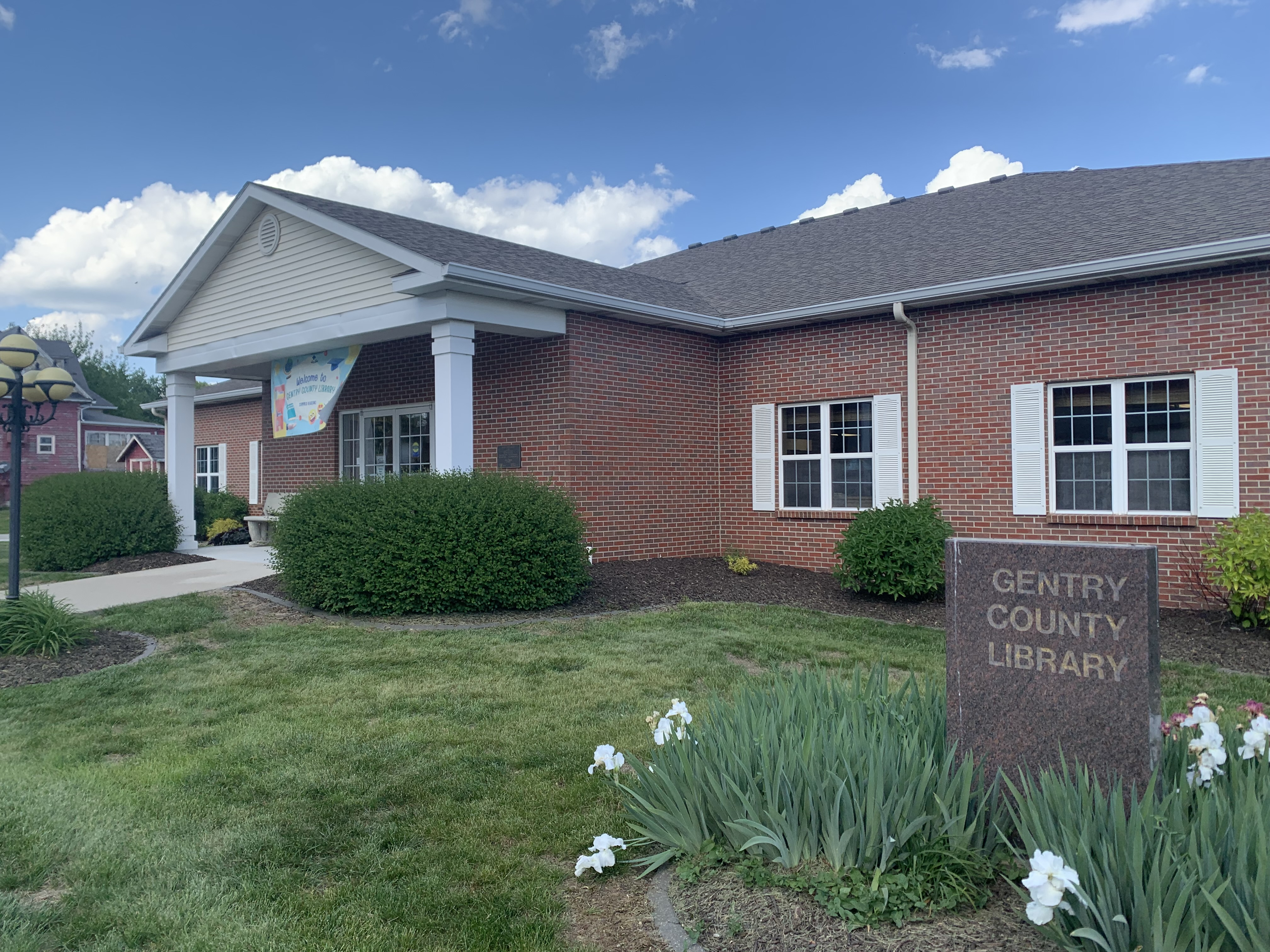
Gentry County Library, May 2025

Public education in Stanberry is administered by Stanberry R-II School District.

Stanberry has a public library, the Gentry County Library.

== Notable person ==
- Jim Spainhower, State Treasurer of Missouri from 1973 to 1981

== See also ==
- List of cities in Missouri
