= Darlington, Missouri =

City in Gentry County, Missouri, United States

- City
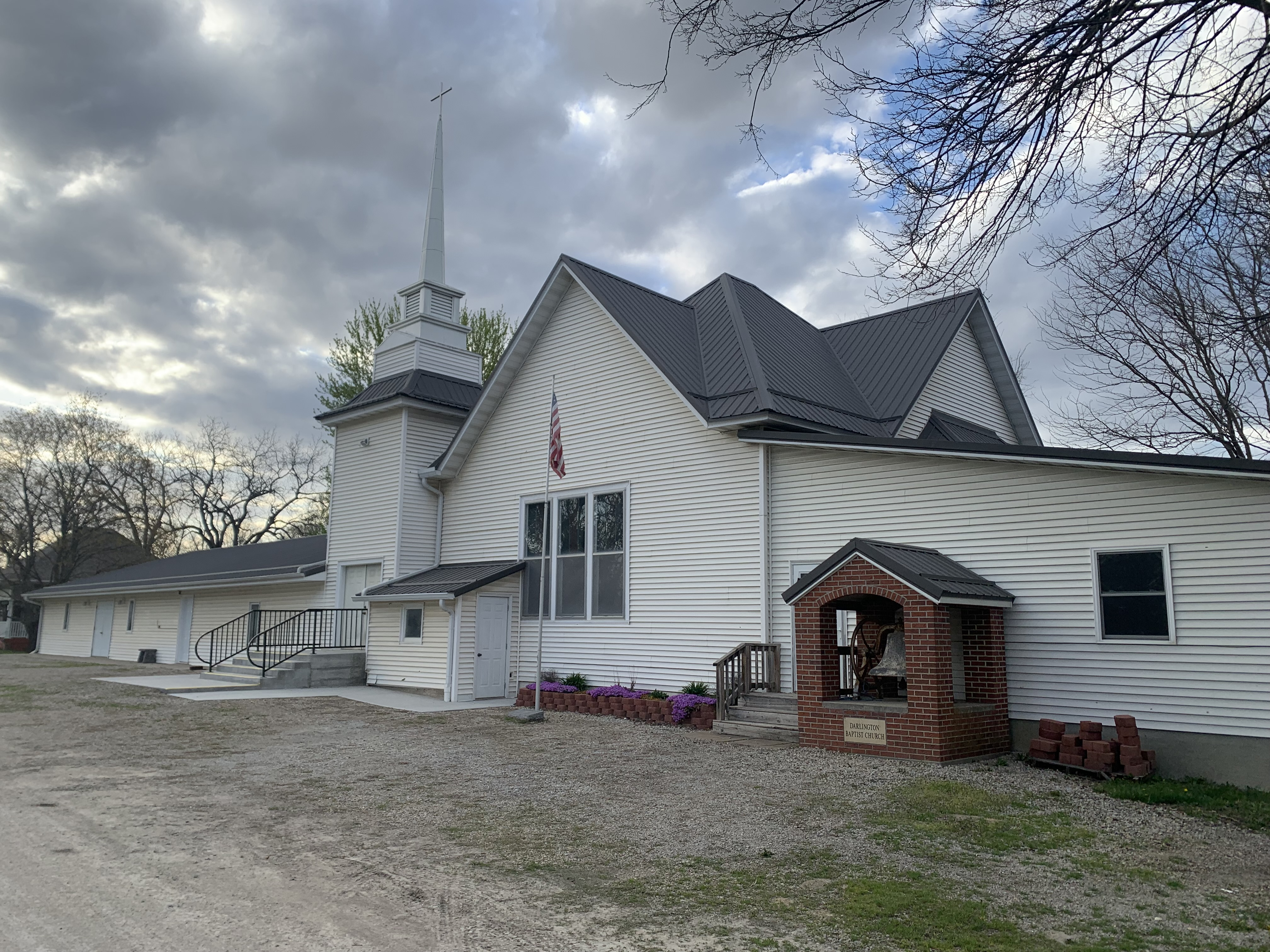
- Darlington Baptist Church, April 2025

- Location of Darlington, Missouri
- Coordinates: 40°11′53″N 94°23′59″W
- Country: United States
- State: Missouri
- County: Gentry
- Township: Cooper

Area
  - Total: 0.41 sq mi (1.07 km^{2})
  - Land: 0.41 sq mi (1.07 km^{2})
  - Water: 0 sq mi (0.00 km^{2})
- Elevation: 846 ft (258 m)

Population (2020)
  - Total: 66
  - Density: 160.5/sq mi (61.96/km^{2})
- Time zone: UTC-6 (Central (CST))
  - Summer (DST): UTC-5 (CDT)
- ZIP code: 64438
- Area code: 660
- FIPS code: 29-18316
- GNIS feature ID: 2398684

Darlington is a small city in central Gentry County, Missouri, United States. The population was 66 at the 2020 census.

== History ==
Darlington was laid out in 1879, and named after a railroad employee. A post office has been in operation at Darlington since 1879.

== Geography ==
Darlington is located on the south edge of the Grand River floodplain. Albany lies approximately four miles to the northeast.

According to the United States Census Bureau, the village has a total area of 0.41 square miles (1.06 km^{2}), all land.

== Demographics ==
Historical population
Census	Pop.	Note	%±
1880	64		—
1890	242		278.1%
1900	369		52.5%
1910	352		−4.6%
1920	311		−11.6%
1930	254		−18.3%
1940	274		7.9%
1950	217		−20.8%
1960	169		−22.1%
1970	164		−3.0%
1980	131		−20.1%
1990	76		−42.0%
2000	113		48.7%
2010	121		7.1%
2020	66		−45.5%
U.S. Decennial Census

=== 2010 census ===
As of the census of 2010, there were 121 people, 44 households, and 34 families residing in the village. The population density was 295.1 inhabitants per square mile (113.9/km^{2}). There were 49 housing units at an average density of 119.5 per square mile (46.1/km^{2}). The racial makeup of the village was 92.6% White, 0.8% Native American, and 6.6% from two or more races.

There were 44 households, of which 40.9% had children under the age of 18 living with them, 59.1% were married couples living together, 18.2% had a female householder with no husband present, and 22.7% were non-families. 20.5% of all households were made up of individuals, and 13.7% had someone living alone who was 65 years of age or older. The average household size was 2.75 and the average family size was 3.15.

The median age in the village was 36.3 years. 29.8% of residents were under the age of 18; 10% were between the ages of 18 and 24; 19.8% were from 25 to 44; 21.6% were from 45 to 64; and 19% were 65 years of age or older. The gender makeup of the village was 43.8% male and 56.2% female.

=== 2000 census ===
As of the census of 2000, there were 113 people, 41 households, and 30 families residing in the city. The population density was 275.7 inhabitants per square mile (106.4/km^{2}). There were 55 housing units at an average density of 134.2 per square mile (51.8/km^{2}). The racial makeup of the city was 100.00% White. Hispanic or Latino of any race were 4.42% of the population.

There were 41 households, out of which 41.5% had children under the age of 18 living with them, 58.5% were married couples living together, 14.6% had a female householder with no husband present, and 26.8% were non-families. 26.8% of all households were made up of individuals, and 7.3% had someone living alone who was 65 years of age or older. The average household size was 2.76 and the average family size was 3.33.

In the city the population was spread out, with 36.3% under the age of 18, 8.8% from 18 to 24, 23.9% from 25 to 44, 19.5% from 45 to 64, and 11.5% who were 65 years of age or older. The median age was 33 years. For every 100 females, there were 88.3 males. For every 100 females age 18 and over, there were 84.6 males.

The median income for a household in the city was $31,250, and the median income for a family was $32,250. Males had a median income of $26,563 versus $15,208 for females. The per capita income for the village was $9,586. There were 12.9% of families and 18.2% of the population living below the poverty line, including 29.7% of under eighteens and none of those over 64.

== See also ==
- List of cities in Missouri
