= Cooper Township, Gentry County, Missouri =

Township in Gentry County, Missouri, U.S.

Cooper Township
- Township
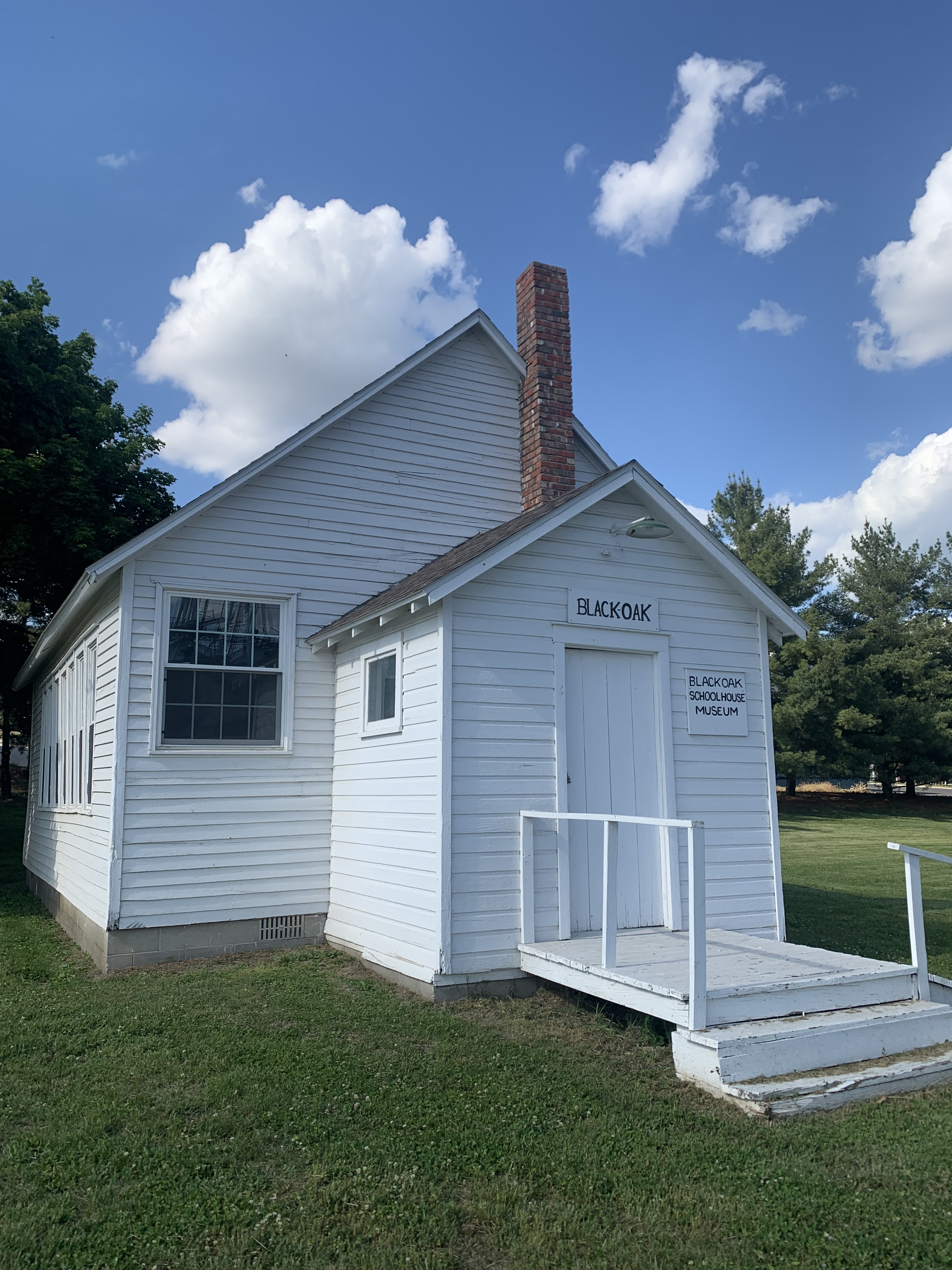
- Black Oak Schoolhouse relocated to Stanberry

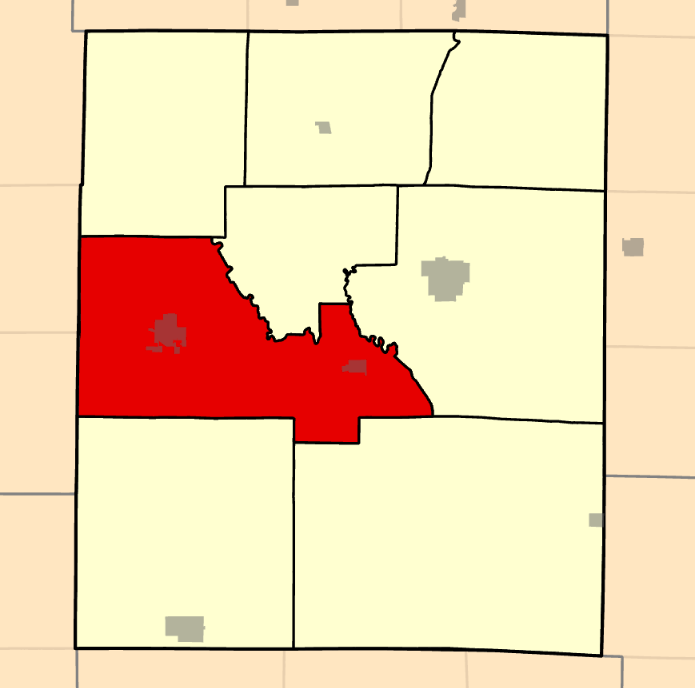
- Coordinates: 40°12′25″N 94°30′35″W
- Country: United States
- State: Missouri
- County: Gentry

Area
  - Total: 69.38 sq mi (179.7 km^{2})
  - Land: 69.37 sq mi (179.7 km^{2})
  - Water: 0.01 sq mi (0.026 km^{2}) 0.01%
- Elevation: 860 ft (260 m)

Population (2020)
  - Total: 1,696
  - Density: 24.4/sq mi (9.4/km^{2})
- FIPS code: 29-07516282
- GNIS feature ID: 766666

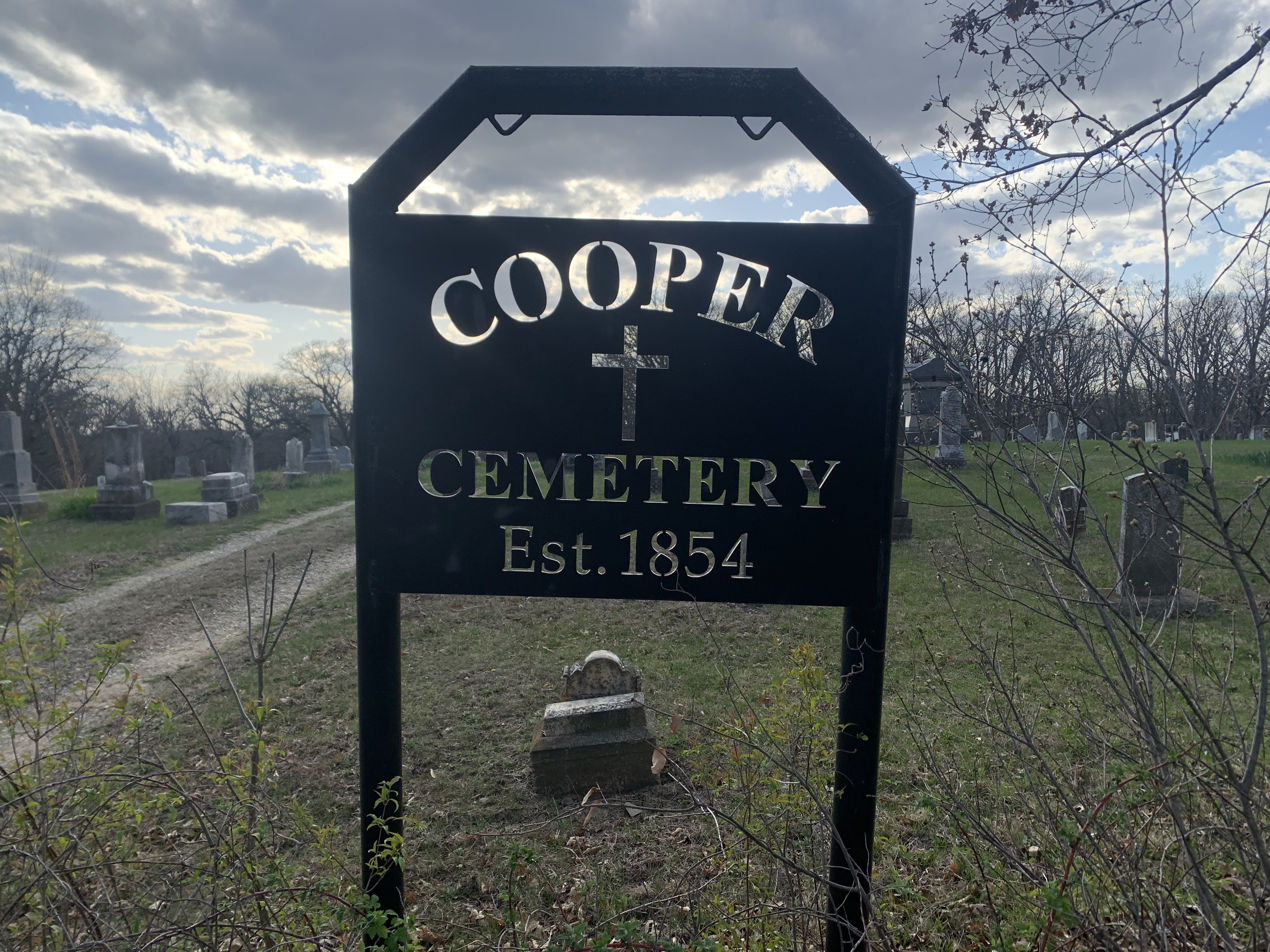
Cooper Township Cemetery

Cooper Township is a township in Gentry County, Missouri, United States. At the 2020 census, its population was 1696.

Cooper Township has the name of Gallenburg Cooper, an early settler.

== Transportation ==
The following highways travel through the township:

- U.S. Route 136
- U.S. Route 169
- Route AA
- Route B
- Route E
- Route H
- Route M
- Route W
