= Berlin, Missouri =

Unincorporated community in Missouri, U.S.

Coordinates: 40°03′13″N 94°21′04″W

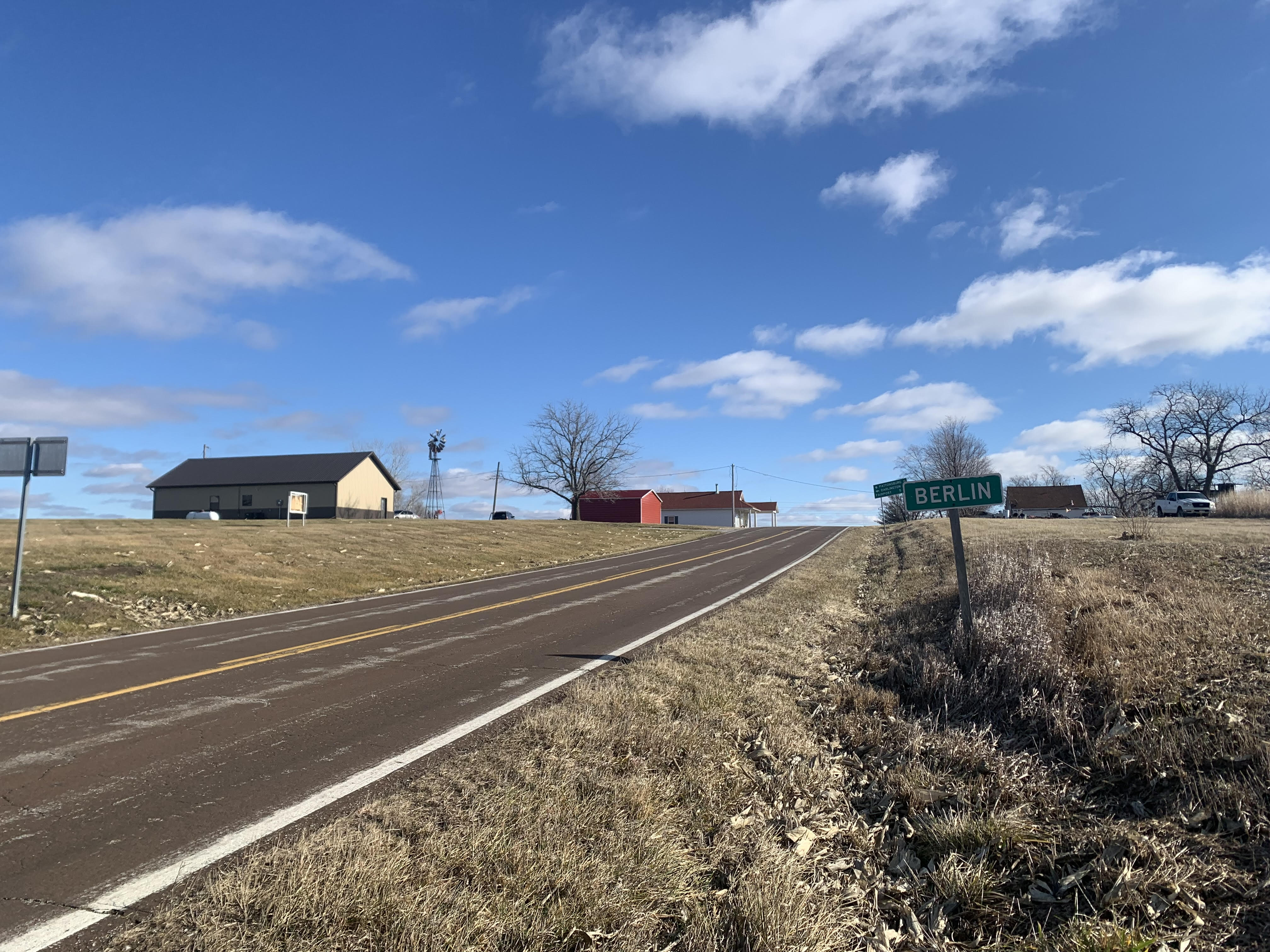
View of Berlin from the west

Berlin is an unincorporated community in Gentry County, Missouri, in the United States. It is situated 4.5 miles north of Fairport and 9 mile east of King City. The GNIS classifies it as a populated place.

A post office called Berlin was established in 1874 and remained in operation until 1906. In 1877 the population was about 20. Currently there are a few houses and a church localized around a highway intersection. A cemetery remains in Berlin about a half-mile south of where the hamlet is.
