= Island City, Missouri =

Unincorporated community in Gentry County, Missouri, United States

Coordinates: 40°08′44″N 94°34′16″W

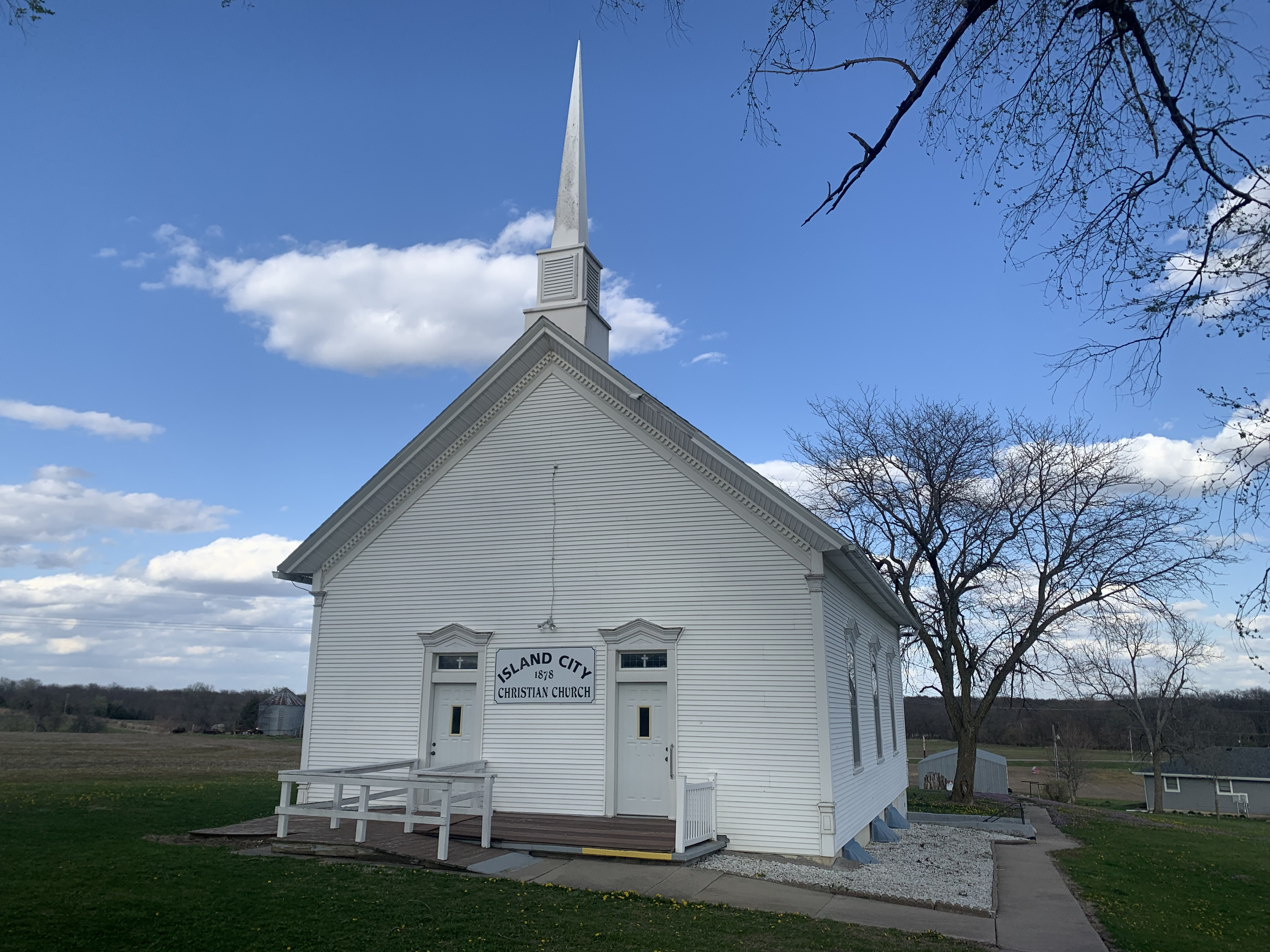
Island City Christian Church in Island City, April 2025

Island City is an unincorporated community in Gentry County, Missouri, United States.

== History ==
A post office called Island City was established in 1858, and remained in operation until 1906. The community took its name from nearby Island Creek.
