= Gentryville, Gentry County, Missouri =

Unincorporated community in Gentry County, Missouri, United States

Coordinates: 40°07′59″N 94°20′39″W

Gentryville is an unincorporated community in Gentry County, Missouri.

== History ==
Gentryville was platted in 1848, taking its name from Gentry County. A post office called Gentryville was established in 1846, and remained in operation until 1938.
