= Platte Valley Conference =

High school athletic conference in Missouri, United States

- Association: MSHSAA
- Folded: 2016
- No. of teams: 8
- Region: Northwest Missouri

The Platte Valley Conference (PVC) was a northwest Missouri-based athletic conference that featured exclusively small, primarily rural schools that are member institutions of the Missouri State High School Activities Association (MSHSAA). This conference was considered one of the stronger sports leagues in class 1 of Missouri sports. It disbanded in 2016 when it merged with the 275 Conference.

== Sports ==
Member schools in the PVC fall football lineup included the Dekalb Tigers, North Andrew Cardinals, Southwest Livingston Wildcats, South Nodaway Longhorns, Stewartsville Cardinals, and Union Star Trojans. These teams competed in Missouri eight-man football.

For basketball, the conference kept most of its football competitors: the Dekalb Tigers, North Andrew Cardinals, South Nodaway Longhorns, Stewartsville Cardinals, and Union Star R-2 Trojans. Also in the PVC basketball group were the Jefferson Eagles, Northeast Nodaway Bluejays, and the Osborn Wildcats.

Starting in 2011–2012, the Platte Valley Conference has had a conference basketball tournament featuring the 8 basketball schools.

On February 6, 2015, the Grand River Conference accepted North Andrew and they moved to the GRC starting in the 2016–2017 school year. The remainder of the PVC joined the 275 Conference starting in the 2016-2017 school year.

== Member schools ==
School	Nickname	Colors	Town	County	9–12 Enrollment (2024)	Primary MSHSAA Classification	Football
De Kalb	Tigers		De Kalb	Buchanan	61	Class 1	8 Man
Jefferson	(Lady) Eagles		Conception Junction	Nodaway	28	Class 1	No
Osborn	Wildcats/ Lady Cats		Osborn	De Kalb	40	Class 1	No
North Andrew	Cardinals		Rosendale	Andrew	68	Class 1	8 Man
Northeast Nodaway	BlueJays		Ravenwood	Nodaway	48	Class 1	N
South Nodaway	Longhorns		Barnard	Nodaway	29	Class 1	8 Man
Stewartsville	Cardinals		Stewartsville	De Kalb	43	Class 1	8 Man
Union Star	Trojans		Union Star	De Kalb	35	Class 1	8 Man

== Former members ==
In years past, the Platte Valley Conference also included Fillmore, but the town's high school consolidated with the North Andrew School District in 1993. The conference also included Elwood, KS through the 2010–2011 school year when they consolidated with Wathena, KS to form Riverside High School.
