= Missouri Route 31 =

State highway in Missouri, U.S.

Route 31

Route information
- Maintained by MoDOT
- Length: 26.852 mi (43.214 km)
- Existed: 1922–present

Major junctions
- South end: US 169 near Gower
- US 36 near Easton
- North end: US 169 / Route E near Union Star

Location
- Country: United States
- State: Missouri

Highway system
- Missouri State Highway System; Interstate; US; State; Supplemental
← Route 30	→ Route 32

Route 31 is a highway in northwestern Missouri. Its northern terminus is at U.S. Route 169 in northwestern De Kalb County; its southern terminus is at US 169 southeast of St. Joseph.

Route 31 was one of the original 1922 state highways. Its northern terminus was originally five miles further north in King City at Route 4. That section of Route 31 became part of U.S. Route 169.

== Route description ==
Route 31 begins in Buchanan County, at the intersection of US Route 169 and 120 SE Road, where it heads northward. It passes through Easton, where a T intersection is formed with Route N, before meeting with US Route 36. Route 31 runs east, concurrent with 36, where it moves into DeKalb County, before they split at the intersection with Spruce Road.

After the split, Route 31 runs north to meet Missouri Route 6, where they run concurrently. The routes run through Clarksdale after the merge, before they turn east and split. Route 31 runs north, before once again meeting with US 169 at the former's northern terminus.

== Junction list ==
County	Location	mi	km	Destinations	Notes
Buchanan	Tremont Township	0.000	0.000	US 169 – St. Joseph, Gower	Southern terminus
Buchanan	Tremont Township	1.590	2.559	Route T to US 169	Eastern terminus of Route T
Buchanan	Tremont Township	1.983	3.191	Route NN	Western terminus of Route NN
Buchanan	Easton	4.468	7.191	Route N (Elijah Road) – Hemple	Western terminus of Route N
Buchanan	Marion Township	6.206	9.988	US 36 – St. Joseph, Stewartsville	Southern end of US 36 concurrency
Buchanan	Marion Township	7.776	12.514	Route AB to Route 6	Southern terminus of Route AB
DeKalb	Washington Township	10.404	16.744	US 36 – St. Joseph, Stewartsville	Northern end of US 36 concurrency
DeKalb	Washington Township	10.956	17.632	Route 6 – St. Joseph	Southern end of Route 6 concurrency
DeKalb	Washington Township	14.102	22.695	Route P – Clarksdale	
DeKalb	Washington Township	14.925	24.019	Route O	Western terminus of Route O
DeKalb	Sherman Township	19.913	32.047	Route V – Helena	Eastern terminus of Route V
DeKalb	Sherman Township	20.808	33.487	Route 6 – Maysville	Northern end of Route 6 concurrency
DeKalb	Polk Township	26.852	43.214	US 169 / Route E – Union Star, King City, Fairport	Northern terminus; Western terminus of Route E
1.000 mi = 1.609 km; 1.000 km = 0.621 mi: Concurrency terminus
