= Orchid, Missouri =

Extinct hamlet in Missouri, U.S.

Coordinates: 39°57′06″N 94°31′47″W

Orchid is an extinct hamlet in northwest DeKalb County, in the U.S. state of Missouri.

The community is on Missouri Route 31 approximately four miles southeast of Union Star and 9.5 miles northwest of Maysville.

== History ==
The Orchid post office closed in 1900. The community probably was named after the orchid plant.
