= Oak, Missouri =

Extinct town in Missouri, U.S.

Coordinates: 39°53′37″N 94°31′47″W

Oak is an extinct hamlet in west-central DeKalb County, in the U.S. state of Missouri.

The community is on Missouri routes 31 and 6 8.5 miles west of Maysville and five miles north of Clarksdale.

== History ==
A post office called Oak was established in 1894, and remained in operation until 1906. The community most likely was named for oak trees at the town site.

== Demographics ==
Oak was incorporated during the 1960 US census. Its population then was 16.

Historical population
| Census | Pop. | Note | %± |
|---|---|---|---|
| 1960 | 16 | | — |
Missouri Census Data Center
