= Camden Township, DeKalb County, Missouri =

Township in DeKalb County, Missouri, U.S.

Camden Township
- Township
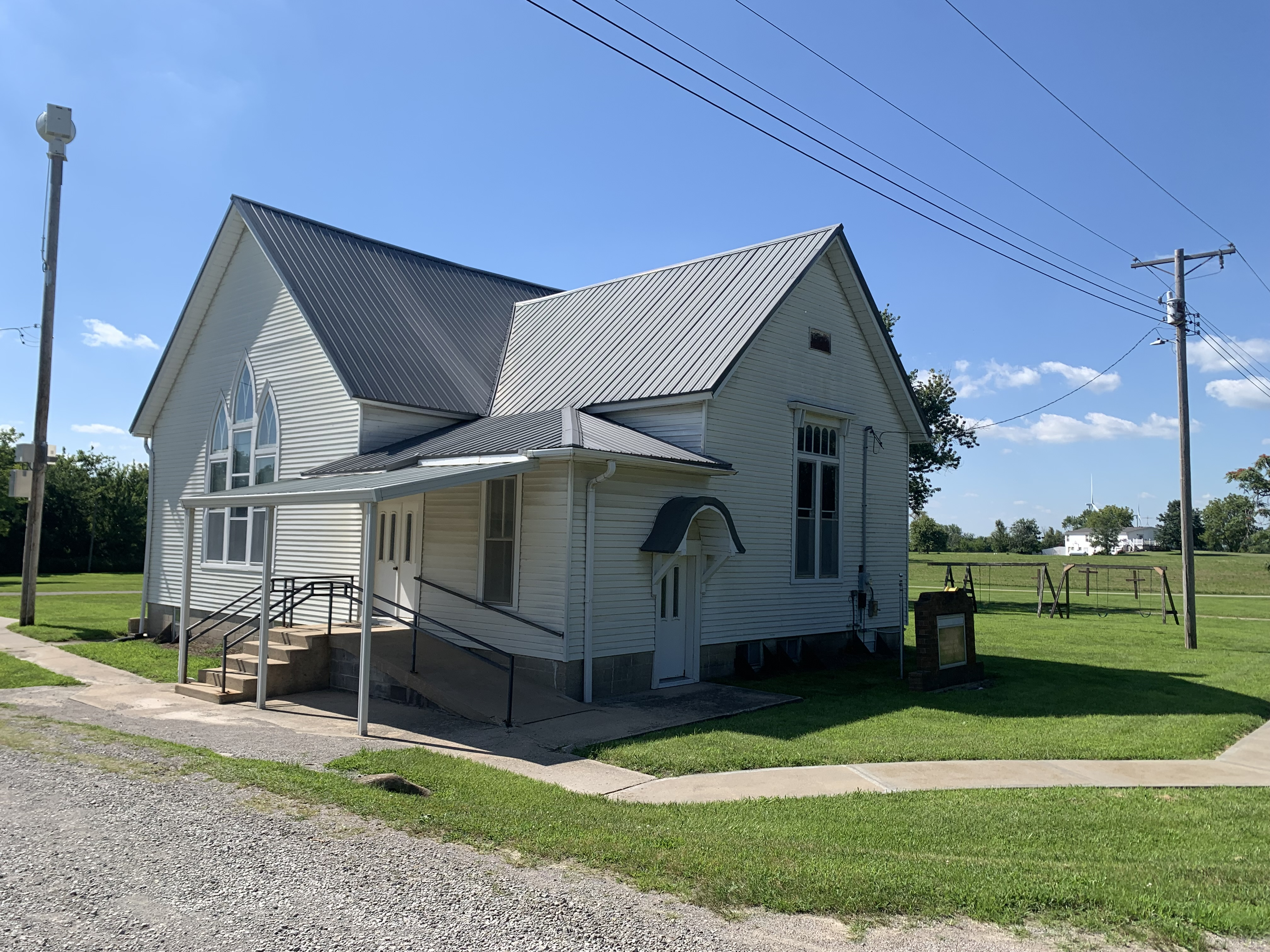
- Church in Amity

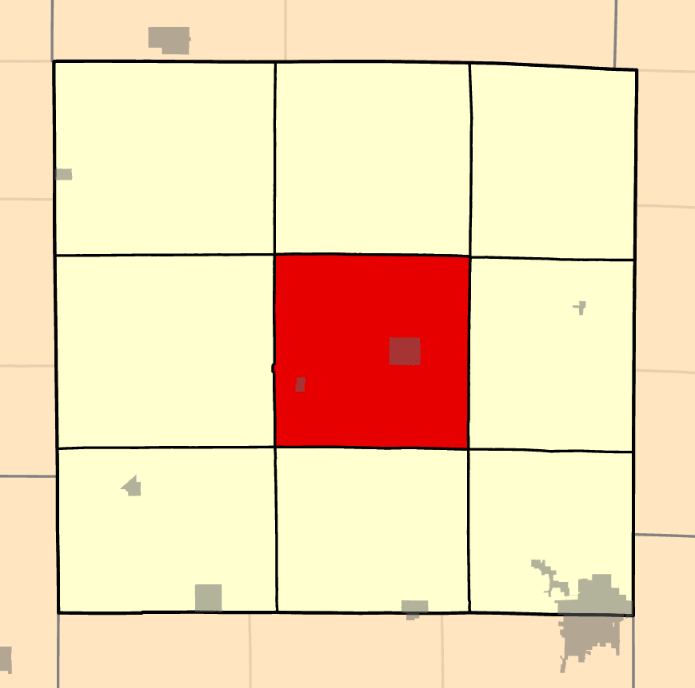
- Coordinates: 39°53′14″N 94°23′12″W
- Country: United States
- State: Missouri
- County: DeKalb

Area
  - Total: 50.22 sq mi (130.1 km^{2})
  - Land: 49.68 sq mi (128.7 km^{2})
  - Water: 0.54 sq mi (1.4 km^{2}) 1.08%
- Elevation: 919 ft (280 m)

Population (2020)
  - Total: 1,647
  - Density: 33.2/sq mi (12.8/km^{2})
- FIPS code: 29-06310720
- GNIS feature ID: 766592

Camden Township is a township in DeKalb County, Missouri, United States. At the 2020 census, its population was 1647. Camden Township was established in 1845, and named after Camden, South Carolina.

== Transportation ==
The following highways travel through the township:

- Route 6
- Route 33
- Route A
- Route H
- Route J
- Route O
- Route W
