= Wood, Missouri =

Extinct community in Missouri, U.S.

Wood Woods
- Extinct community
- Location within Missouri Wood (the United States)
- Coordinates: 39°57′06″N 94°27′12″W
- Country: United States
- State: Missouri
- County: DeKalb
- Post office established: 1898
- Post office discontinued: 1902
- Elevation: 1,043 ft (318 m)
- Time zone: UTC-6 (Central (CST))
  - Summer (DST): UTC-5 (CDT)
- GNIS feature ID: 739620

Wood (also known as Woods) is an extinct hamlet in DeKalb County, in the U.S. state of Missouri.

The community is on Missouri Route H approximately 6.5 miles northwest of Maysville. Lost Creek flows past approximately one-half mile east of the community.

== History ==
A post office called Woods was established in 1898, and remained in operation until 1902. The community has the name of J. Wood, the original owner of the site. Nothing remains of the settlement today.
