= Winslow, Missouri =

Extinct Hamlet in northwest Missouri, U.S.

Coordinates: 40°00′37″N 94°27′45″W

Winslow is an extinct hamlet in Dekalb County, Missouri, in the United States. It is situated 4.5 miles southeast of King City and about 6 miles west-northwest of Fairport. The GNIS classifies it as a populated place despite there being no extant remains of the settlement.

A post office called Winslow was established in 1869 and remained in operation until 1905.
