= Sherman Township, DeKalb County, Missouri =

Township in Missouri, U.S.

Sherman Township
- Township
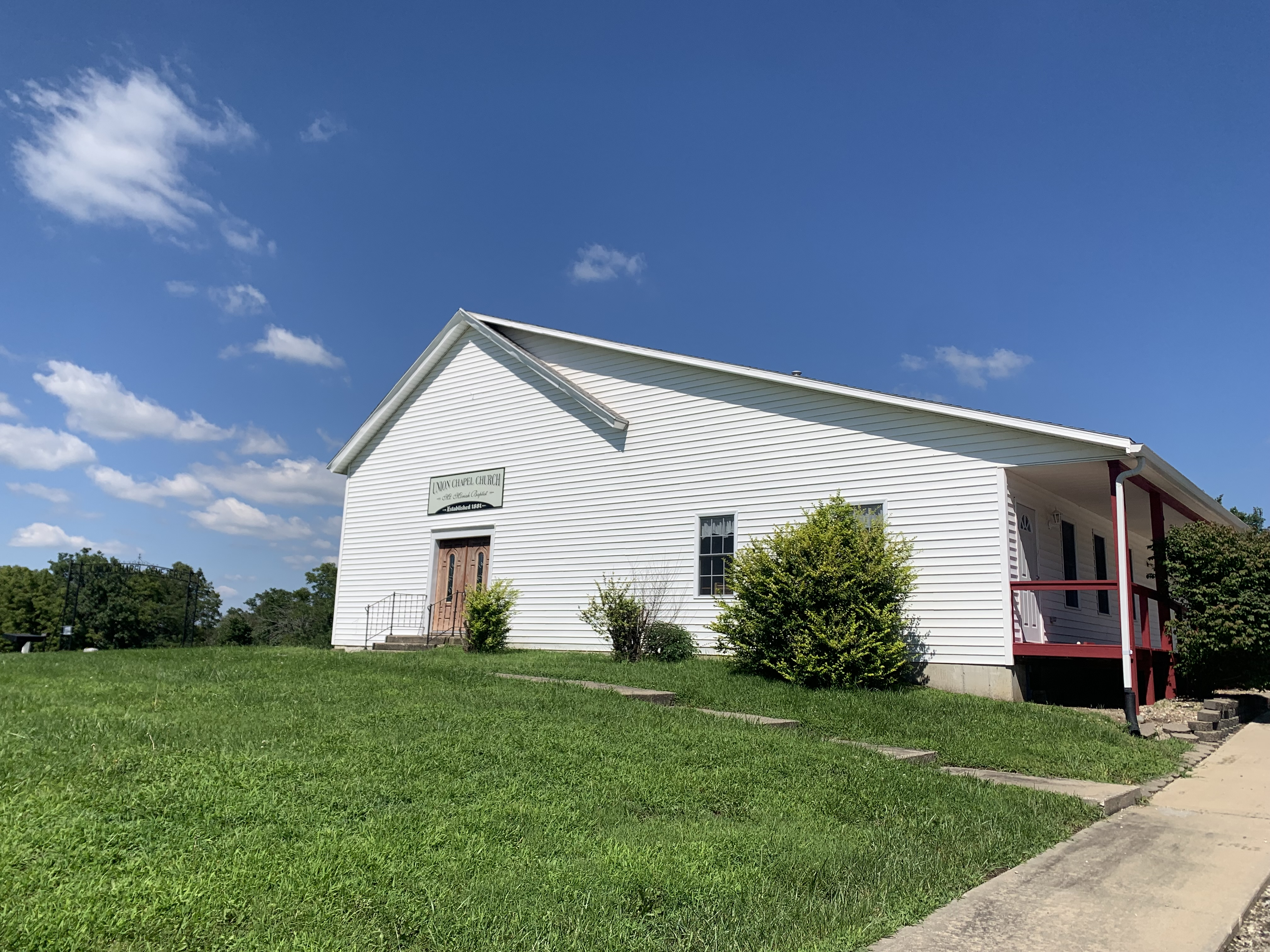
- Union Chapel Church at Mt. Moriah Chapel in Sherman Township

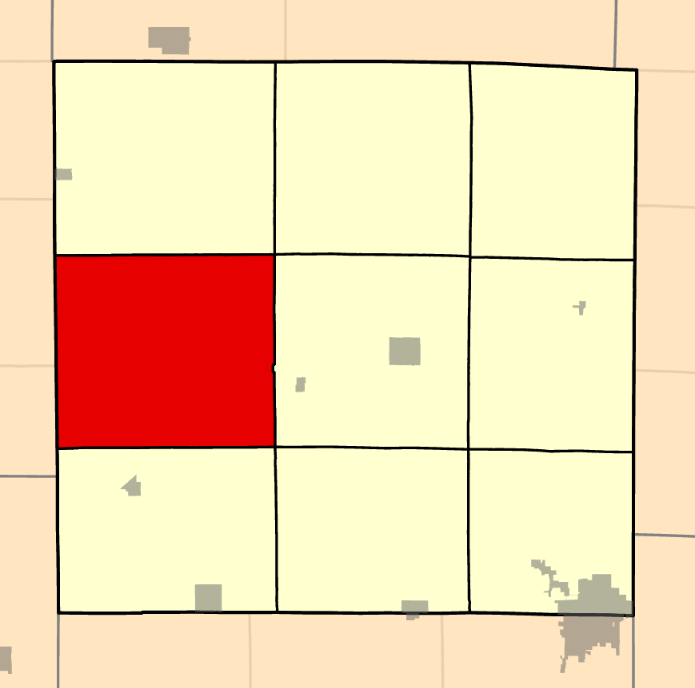
- Coordinates: 39°53′09″N 94°31′11″W
- Country: United States
- State: Missouri
- County: DeKalb

Area
  - Total: 56.3 sq mi (146 km^{2})
  - Land: 55.92 sq mi (144.8 km^{2})
  - Water: 0.38 sq mi (0.98 km^{2}) 0.67%
- Elevation: 945 ft (288 m)

Population (2020)
  - Total: 491
  - Density: 8.8/sq mi (3.4/km^{2})
- FIPS code: 29-06367430
- GNIS feature ID: 766598

Sherman Township is a township in DeKalb County, Missouri, United States. At the 2020 census, its population was 491.

Sherman Township was established in 1870, taking its name from William Tecumseh Sherman, an officer in the Civil War.

== Transportation ==
The following highways travel through the township:

- Route 6
- Route 31
- Route F
- Route N
- Route V
