= Adams Township, DeKalb County, Missouri =

Township in the U.S. state of Missouri

- Township
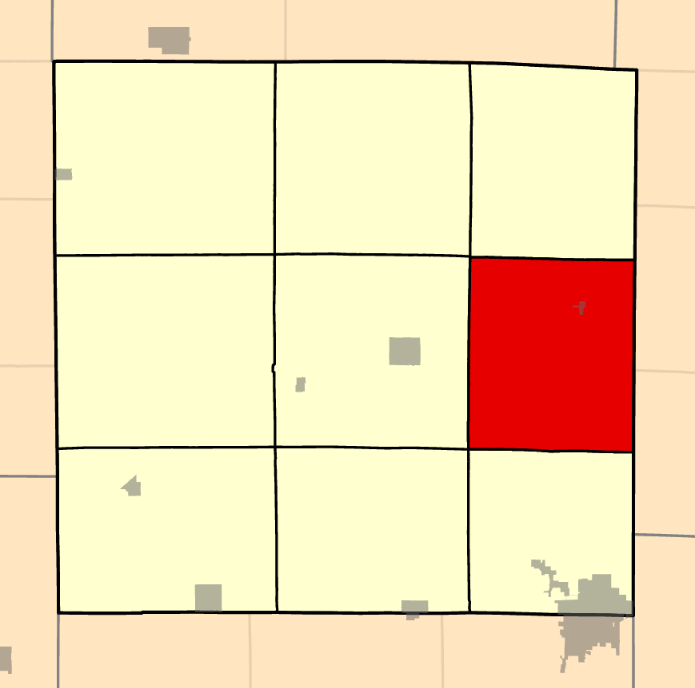
- Coordinates: 39°53′14″N 94°23′12″W
- Country: United States
- State: Missouri
- County: DeKalb

Area
  - Total: 42.3 sq mi (109.6 km^{2})
  - Land: 42.3 sq mi (109.5 km^{2})
  - Water: 0.039 sq mi (0.1 km^{2})
- Elevation: 919 ft (280 m)

Population (2020)
  - Total: 649
  - Density: 15.5/sq mi (6.0/km^{2})
- Time zone: UTC-6 (Central (CST))
  - Summer (DST): UTC-5 (CDT)
- FIPS code: 29-06300208
- GNIS feature ID: 0766591

Adams Township is a township in DeKalb County, Missouri, United States. At the 2020 census, its population was 1647.

Adams Township was established in 1870, and most likely was named after President John Adams.

== Transportation ==
The following highways travel through the township:

- Route 6
- Route C
- Route D
- Route EE
- Route W
