= Dallas Township =

Dallas Township may refer to:

- Dallas Township, Huntington County, Indiana
- Dallas Township, Dallas County, Iowa
- Dallas Township, Marion County, Iowa, in Marion County, Iowa
- Dallas Township, Taylor County, Iowa
- Dallas Township, Michigan
- Dallas Township, DeKalb County, Missouri
- Dallas Township, Harrison County, Missouri
- Dallas Township, St. Clair County, Missouri
- Dallas Township, Gaston County, North Carolina
- Dallas Township, Ohio
- Dallas Township, Luzerne County, Pennsylvania
