= Washington Township, DeKalb County, Missouri =

Township in Missouri, U.S.

Washington Township
- Township
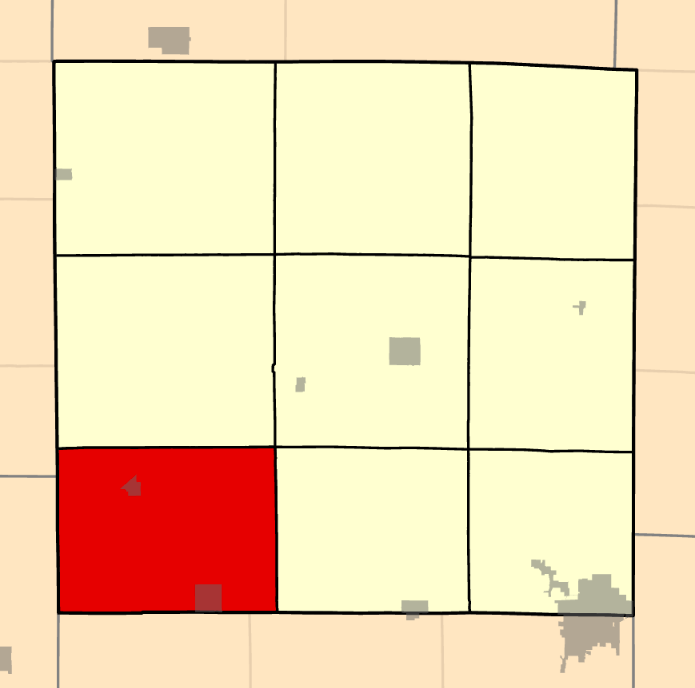
- Coordinates: 39°47′40″N 94°31′35″W
- Country: United States
- State: Missouri
- County: DeKalb

Area
  - Total: 48.36 sq mi (125.3 km^{2})
  - Land: 47.88 sq mi (124.0 km^{2})
  - Water: 0.48 sq mi (1.2 km^{2}) 0.99%
- Elevation: 1,043 ft (318 m)

Population (2020)
  - Total: 1,798
  - Density: 37.6/sq mi (14.5/km^{2})
- FIPS code: 29-06377380
- GNIS feature ID: 766599

Washington Township is a township in DeKalb County, Missouri, United States. At the 2020 census, its population was 1,798.

== Transportation ==
The following highways travel through the township:

- U.S. Route 36
- Route 6
- Route 31
- Route K
- Route N
- Route O
- Route P
- Route Y
