= Boxford, Missouri =

Extinct hamlet in Missouri, U.S.

Coordinates: 39°50′54″N 94°35′19″W

Boxford is an extinct town in DeKalb County, in the U.S. state of Missouri.

The community was on the east bank of the Third Fork Platte River approximately three miles northwest of Clarksdale and about one-half mile from the DeKalb–Andrew county line.

A post office was established in 1854, and remained in operation until 1902. The community was supposed to be named Oxford; a postal error accounts for the error in spelling, which was never corrected.
