= Missouri Route 33 =

State highway in Missouri, U.S.

Route 33

Route information
- Maintained by MoDOT
- Length: 49.464 mi (79.605 km)
- Existed: 1922–present

Major junctions
- South end: US 69 in Liberty
- US 36 near Osborn
- North end: Route 6 / Route A in Maysville

Location
- Country: United States
- State: Missouri

Highway system
- Missouri State Highway System; Interstate; US; State; Supplemental
← Route 32	→ Route 34

Route 33 is a highway in western Missouri. Its northern terminus is at Route 6 in Maysville; its southern terminus is at U.S. Route 69 in Liberty.

== History ==
Route 33 is one of the original 1922 state highways. Its northern terminus was at Route 8 (now U.S. Route 136) in southern DeKalb County. At Plattsburg, it turned west (modern Route 116) and then south on current U.S. Route 169.

A branch route, Route 33A, left the former alignment and connected it with Lathrop. This branch is now part of the highway itself.

== Route Description ==
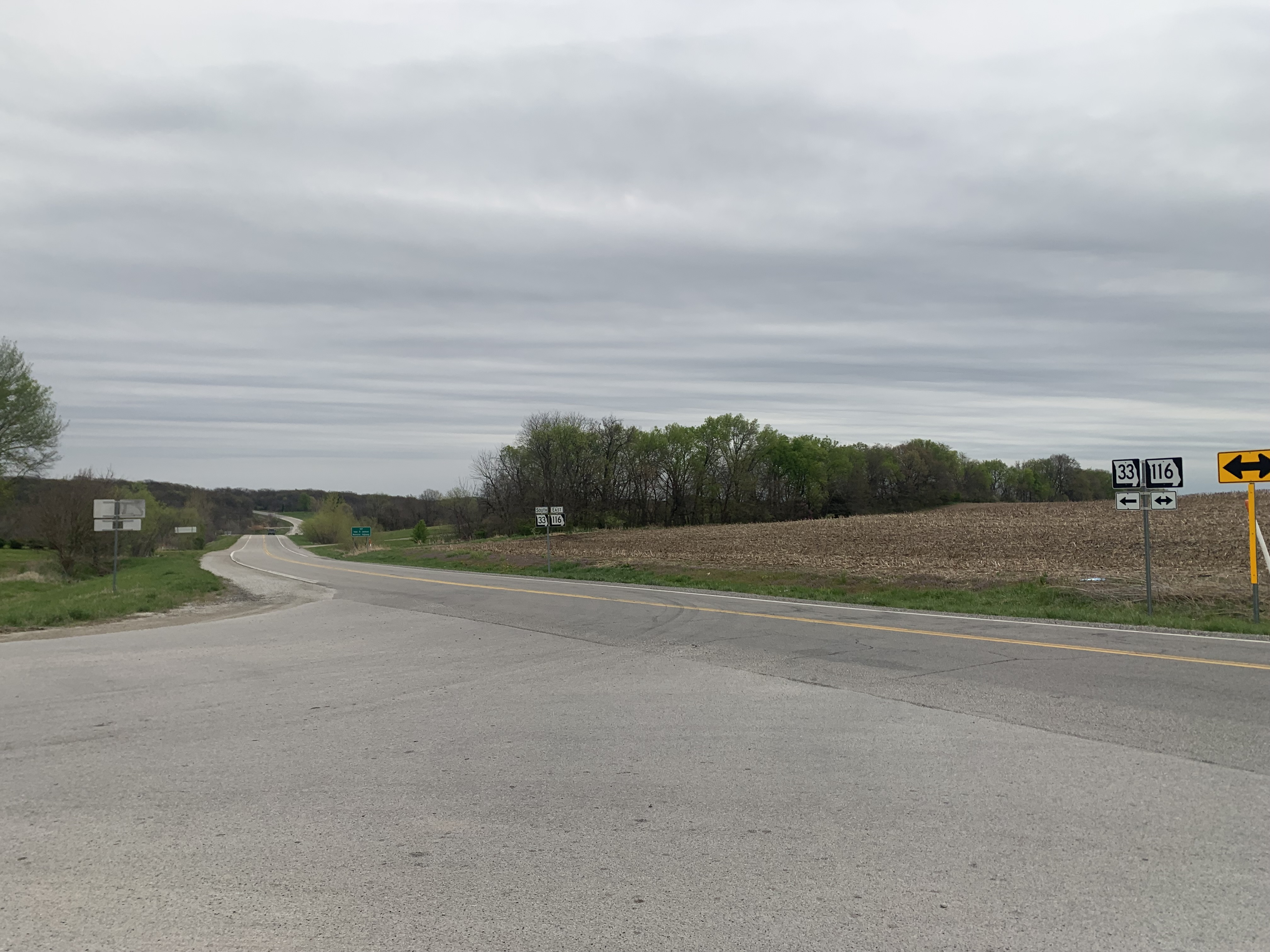
Junction between Missouri Route 33 and Route 116 east of Plattsburg, facing east.

Route 33 begins in the northeast corner of Liberty and travels 2 miles northeast before turning north and travelling another 3 miles to where it intersects Route 92 in Kearney. The road continues north, crosses under I-35 and continues north another 5 miles before turning east 1 mile and entering Holt. Leaving Holt, Route 33 enters Clinton County and heads northerly, passing Lake Arrowhead to the west and passing through Lathrop before reaching Route 116. Turning west and running concurrently with Route 116, Route 33 travels almost 5 miles before separating and turning north and running another 13 miles until reaching Route 36 in DeKalb County. Route 33 travels about 2.5 miles east concurrent with US-36 to Osborn, before turning north and traveling about 9 miles north until its northern terminus in Maysville.

== Major intersections ==
County	Location	mi	km	Destinations	Notes
Clay	Liberty	0.000	0.000	US 69 – Mosby, Liberty	
Clay	Kearney	5.323	8.567	Route 92 – Excelsior Springs, Smithville	
Clinton	Lathrop	20.068	32.296	Route 116 east to I-35 / Route A – Turney	Southern end of Route 116 overlap
Clinton	Concord Township	24.902	40.076	Route 116 west – Plattsburg	Northern end of Route 116 overlap
DeKalb	Colfax Township	38.155	61.405	US 36 west – Stewartsville	Southern end of US 36 overlap
DeKalb	Colfax Township	40.411	65.035	US 36 east / Route M – Osborn, Cameron	Northern end of US 36 overlap
DeKalb	Maysville	49.464	79.605	Route 6 (Main Street) / Route A (N. Polk Street)	Roadway continues as Route A
1.000 mi = 1.609 km; 1.000 km = 0.621 mi: Concurrency terminus
