= Alta Vista, Missouri =

Unincorporated community in Missouri, U.S.

Coordinates: 39°54′33″N 94°12′19″W

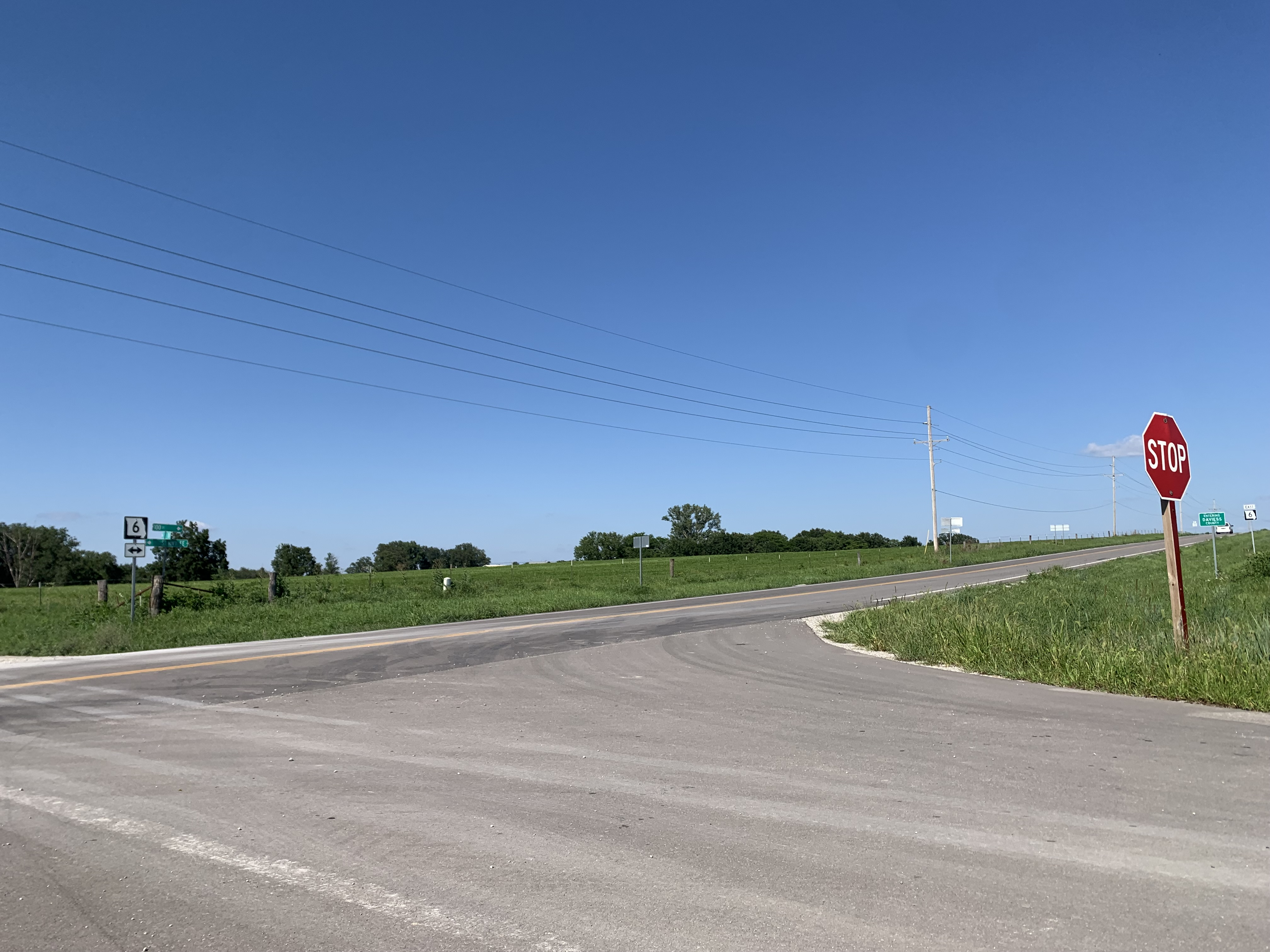
Site of Alta Vista on Route 6

Alta Vista is an unincorporated community in Daviess and DeKalb counties, in the U.S. state of Missouri.

The community sits on a ridge above and east of Grindstone Creek. Missouri Route 6 passes through the location. Weatherby is two miles to the west along route 6.

== History ==
Alto Vista was laid out in 1865, and named for its lofty elevation. A post office called Alta Vista was established in 1865, and remained in operation until 1905.
