= Hemple, Missouri =

Unincorporated community in Missouri, U.S.

Coordinates: 39°43′32″N 94°33′42″W

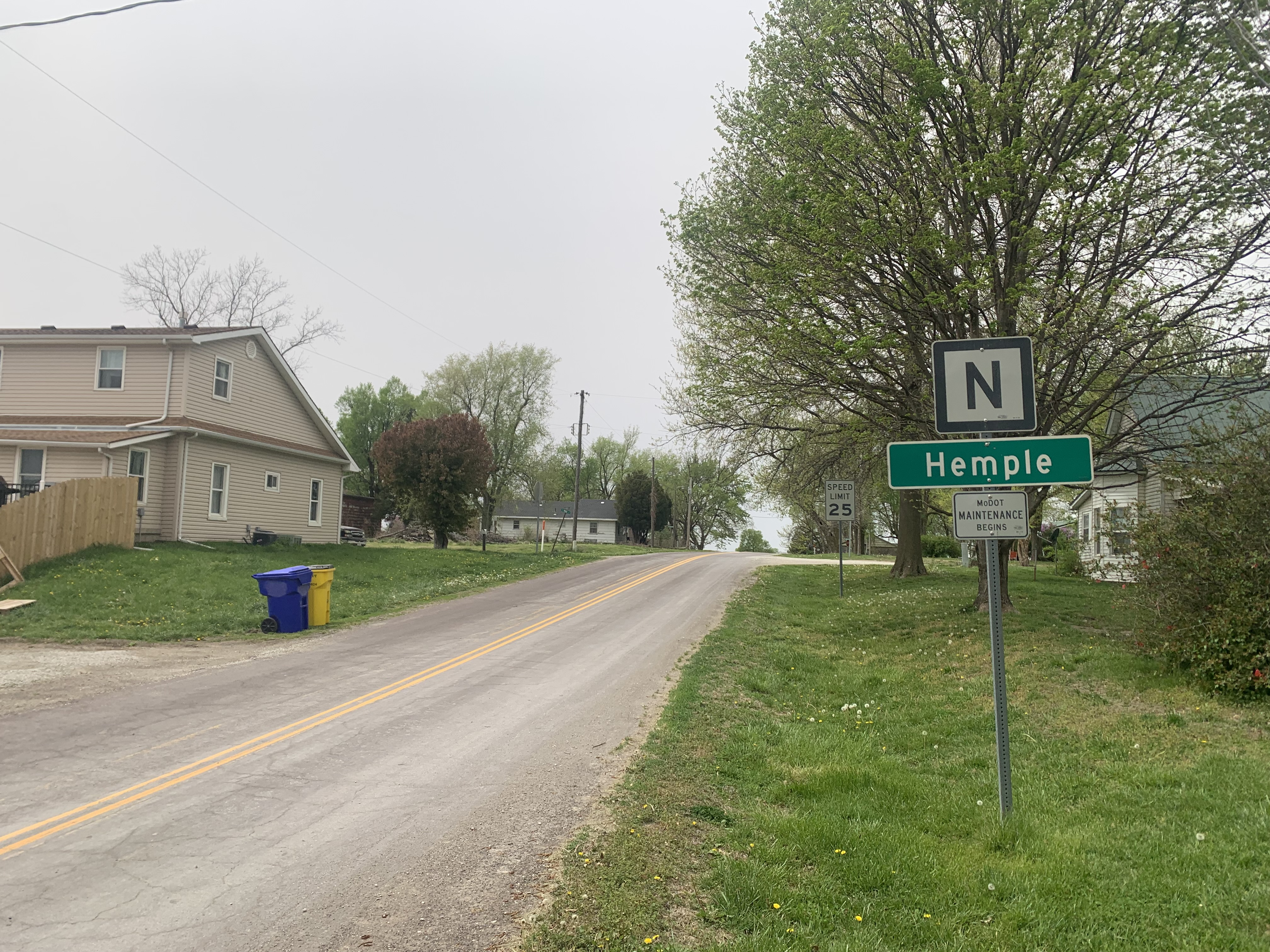
Hemple, Missouri from Missouri Route N

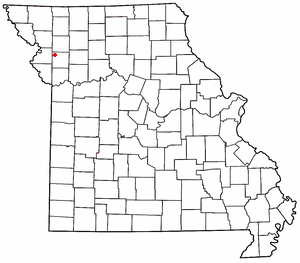

Hemple is an unincorporated community in northwestern Clinton County, Missouri, and a part of the Kansas City metropolitan area within the United States. It is located approximately 3.5 miles southwest of Stewartsville in DeKalb County and four miles east of Easton in Buchanan County.

A post office called Hemple was established in 1889 and remained in operation until 1974. According to the State Historical Society of Missouri, the source of the name Hemple is obscure. The population at the beginning of the 20th century was around 80.
