= Lost Creek (Grindstone Creek tributary) =

Stream in Missouri, USA

Lost Creek is a stream in DeKalb and Gentry counties in the U.S. state of Missouri.It is a tributary of Grindstone Creek.

The stream headwaters are at 40°06′11″N 94°28′56″W and the confluence with Grindstone Creek is at 39°53′09″N 94°14′27″W.

According to tradition, the creek was named for an incident when a party of soldiers were lost during a blizzard near the creek.

== See also ==
- List of rivers of Missouri
