= Colfax Township, DeKalb County, Missouri =

Township in the US state of Missouri

Colfax Township
- Township
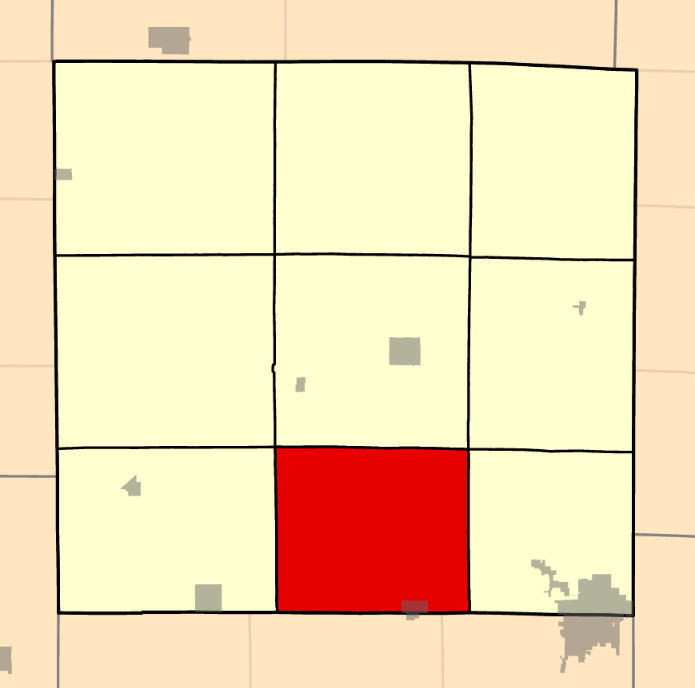
- Coordinates: 39°47′35″N 94°23′00″W
- Country: United States
- State: Missouri
- County: DeKalb

Area
  - Total: 42.62 sq mi (110.4 km^{2})
  - Land: 41.82 sq mi (108.3 km^{2})
  - Water: 0.8 sq mi (2.1 km^{2}) 1.88%
- Elevation: 978 ft (298 m)

Population (2020)
  - Total: 695
  - Density: 16.6/sq mi (6.4/km^{2})
- FIPS code: 29-06315490
- GNIS feature ID: 766593

Colfax Township is a township in DeKalb County, Missouri, United States. At the 2020 census, its population was 695.

Colfax Township was established in 1870, taking its name from Vice President Schuyler Colfax.

== Transportation ==
The following highways travel through the township:

- U.S. Route 36
- Route 33
- Route J
- Route M
- Route O
- Route RA
