= Union Star R-II School District =

School district in Missouri, U.S.

Coordinates: 39°58′56″N 94°35′53″W

Union Star R-II School District is the name of the school district that is located in Union Star, Missouri. It is a K-12 facility that has about 200 total students. The school mascot is the Trojan, and its colors are blue and gold.

It is partly in DeKalb County, where it includes Union Star. It extends into Andrew County.

== School information ==
The Union Star R-II school district is fully accredited by the Missouri State Board of Education and recently received the "Distinction in Performance" award.

Union Star is affiliated with the Platte Valley Conference and is rated Class 1A by MSHSAA. Activities provided for the students include:

- Academic Team
- 8-Man American football
- Boys' Basketball
- Girls' Softball
- Girls' Basketball
- Cheerleading
- Envirothon
- FFA

Recent achievements by the students in these activities include six consecutive trips to the MSHSAA State Academic Competition Championships, as well as representing Missouri in the 2002 Cannon Envirothon and winning the district girls' softball championship.

Under Mrs. Belinda Pearl the Academic team has made it to state multiple times. Academic team is a contest where students answer questions with a buzzer system. The questions are over a variety of topics including math, science, history, language, sports, current events, and common knowledge. Contestants are awarded points for every question answered correctly, and there are four rounds: the first and third consist of 15 toss-ups and the second and fourth contain 10 toss-ups with the potential for bonus questions on a correct toss-up response. Bonuses are questions that require 4 answers for the correct answer. Players get 10 pts for every toss-up and 5 pts for each of the four parts of a bonus question.

Union Star was a dominant competitor through most of the 1960s in six-man football, at one point going over half a decade without losing a contest. Northwest Missouri schools switched to eight-man football almost immediately following this period, and the Trojans still compete in the MSHSAA eight-man league. The team's most recent football team accolade came in 1989, when the Union Star team won a District Championship, advancing to the State Semifinal.

In 2006 The football team finished with a 1–9 record under Coach Tom Corrington. The starting quarterback was Matthew Tritten who was the team's most valuable player. Running Back Mitchell Schnitcker was a major contributor running the ball, and the main receiving target was Micah Konyha. These three all received conference accolades.

== School history ==
The oldest part of the current building is a three-story structure, originally built in 1914 and now houses the elementary classes. There have been several additions and renovations, the most recent being the multi-purpose room that was completed in 1995.
