= Lathrop, Missouri =

City in the United States

- City
- Nickname: The Mule Capital of the World
- Location of Lathrop, Missouri
- Coordinates: 39°33′31″N 94°18′04″W
- Country: United States
- State: Missouri
- County: Clinton
- Established: Founded in 1867

Area
  - Total: 4.19 sq mi (10.86 km^{2})
  - Land: 4.19 sq mi (10.86 km^{2})
  - Water: 0 sq mi (0.00 km^{2})
- Elevation: 1,043 ft (318 m)

Population (2020)
  - Total: 2,271
  - Density: 542/sq mi (209.1/km^{2})
- Time zone: UTC-6 (Central (CST))
  - Summer (DST): UTC-5 (CDT)
- ZIP code: 64465
- Area codes: 816, 975
- FIPS code: 29-40826
- GNIS feature ID: 2395639
- Website: www.cityoflathropmo.org

Lathrop is a city in Clinton County, Missouri, and is part of the Kansas City metropolitan area within the United States. The population was 2,271 at the 2020 census.

== History ==
Lathrop was platted in 1867 as a stop on the Cameron Cutoff Branch of the Hannibal and St. Joseph Railroad. It was named for John L. Lathrop, treasurer for the railroad. A post office called Lathrop has been in operation since 1868.

In the early 1900s it was considered the "Mule Capital of the World" after the firm of Guyton and Harrington sold 180,000 mules and 170,000 horses to the British Army during World War I. The cousins J.D. Guyton and W.R. Harrington owned 4,700 acres near Lathrop. They also supplied mules to the British during the Boer War. Among the facilities in Lathrop were three barns stabling 1,000 mules each and a 496 foot long hay barn. The British had a formal contract for a remount station in Lathrop. The business had facilities at 17th and Wyandotte in Kansas City and had a shipping port facilities at Chalmette, Louisiana. The mule business collapsed in the 1920s. There are several businesses in Lathrop that include "mule" in their name now, The Mule Stop, and a road east of town is called Mule Barn Road. The mascot of the high school team is the mules.

== Geography ==
Lathrop is located on the south side of the intersection of Missouri routes 33 and 116. It is three miles west of I-35 and nine miles east of Plattsburg.

According to the United States Census Bureau, the city has a total area of 1.79 square miles (4.64 km^{2}), all land.

== Demographics ==
Historical population
Census	Pop.	Note	%±
1870	523		—
1880	746		42.6%
1890	1,082		45.0%
1900	1,118		3.3%
1910	1,038		−7.2%
1920	1,100		6.0%
1930	940		−14.5%
1940	1,049		11.6%
1950	888		−15.3%
1960	1,006		13.3%
1970	1,268		26.0%
1980	1,732		36.6%
1990	1,794		3.6%
2000	2,092		16.6%
2010	2,086		−0.3%
2020	2,271		8.9%
U.S. Decennial Census

=== 2020 census ===
As of the 2020 census, Lathrop had a population of 2,271. The median age was 36.6 years. 28.9% of residents were under the age of 18 and 15.5% of residents were 65 years of age or older. For every 100 females there were 100.6 males, and for every 100 females age 18 and over there were 94.3 males age 18 and over.

0.0% of residents lived in urban areas, while 100.0% lived in rural areas.

There were 872 households in Lathrop, of which 36.8% had children under the age of 18 living in them. Of all households, 47.2% were married-couple households, 17.7% were households with a male householder and no spouse or partner present, and 25.5% were households with a female householder and no spouse or partner present. About 27.0% of all households were made up of individuals and 12.5% had someone living alone who was 65 years of age or older.

There were 965 housing units, of which 9.6% were vacant. The homeowner vacancy rate was 2.5% and the rental vacancy rate was 10.1%.

Racial composition as of the 2020 census
Race	Number	Percent
White	2,092	92.1%
Black or African American	7	0.3%
American Indian and Alaska Native	12	0.5%
Asian	2	0.1%
Native Hawaiian and Other Pacific Islander	0	0.0%
Some other race	14	0.6%
Two or more races	144	6.3%
Hispanic or Latino (of any race)	65	2.9%

=== 2010 census ===
As of the census of 2010, there were 2,086 people, 794 households, and 574 families residing in the city. The population density was 1,165.4 inhabitants per square mile (450.0/km^{2}). There were 890 housing units at an average density of 497.2 per square mile (192.0/km^{2}). The racial makeup of the city was 95.2% White, 1.2% African American, 1.2% Native American, 0.4% Asian, 0.3% from other races, and 1.7% from two or more races. Hispanic or Latino of any race were 1.2% of the population.

There were 794 households, of which 40.1% had children under the age of 18 living with them, 52.0% were married couples living together, 14.7% had a female householder with no husband present, 5.5% had a male householder with no wife present, and 27.7% were non-families. 23.4% of all households were made up of individuals, and 8.7% had someone living alone who was 65 years of age or older. The average household size was 2.63 and the average family size was 3.08.

The median age in the city was 34 years. 28.5% of residents were under the age of 18; 8.9% were between the ages of 18 and 24; 27.1% were from 25 to 44; 23.6% were from 45 to 64; and 11.7% were 65 years of age or older. The gender makeup of the city was 48.9% male and 51.1% female.

=== 2000 census ===
As of the census of 2000, there were 2,092 people, 766 households, and 557 families residing in the city. The population density was 1,508.5 inhabitants per square mile (582.4/km^{2}). There were 827 housing units at an average density of 596.3 per square mile (230.2/km^{2}). The racial makeup of the city was 96.27% White, 1.96% African American, 0.19% Native American, 0.05% Asian, 0.19% from other races, and 1.34% from two or more races. Hispanic or Latino of any race were 1.58% of the population.

There were 766 households, out of which 41.5% had children under the age of 18 living with them, 55.4% were married couples living together, 13.6% had a female householder with no husband present, and 27.2% were non-families. 23.5% of all households were made up of individuals, and 11.2% had someone living alone who was 65 years of age or older. The average household size was 2.66 and the average family size was 3.16.

In the city the population was spread out, with 29.6% under the age of 18, 9.4% from 18 to 24, 29.5% from 25 to 44, 19.6% from 45 to 64, and 11.8% who were 65 years of age or older. The median age was 33 years. For every 100 females, there were 90.5 males. For every 100 females age 18 and over, there were 86.1 males.

The median income for a household in the city was $39,537, and the median income for a family was $46,157. Males had a median income of $34,286 versus $21,344 for females. The per capita income for the city was $17,189. About 8.9% of families and 10.9% of the population were below the poverty line, including 14.7% of those under age 18 and 12.6% of those age 65 or over.

== Education ==
It is in the Lathrop R-II School District.

Lathrop High School currently has a student population of 297 students, with a student teacher ratio of 14:1. Lathrop’s sports teams saw a period of success during the 2017–2018 school year.

== See also ==
- List of cities in Missouri
