= Polk Township, DeKalb County, Missouri =

Township in Missouri, U.S.

Polk Township
- Township
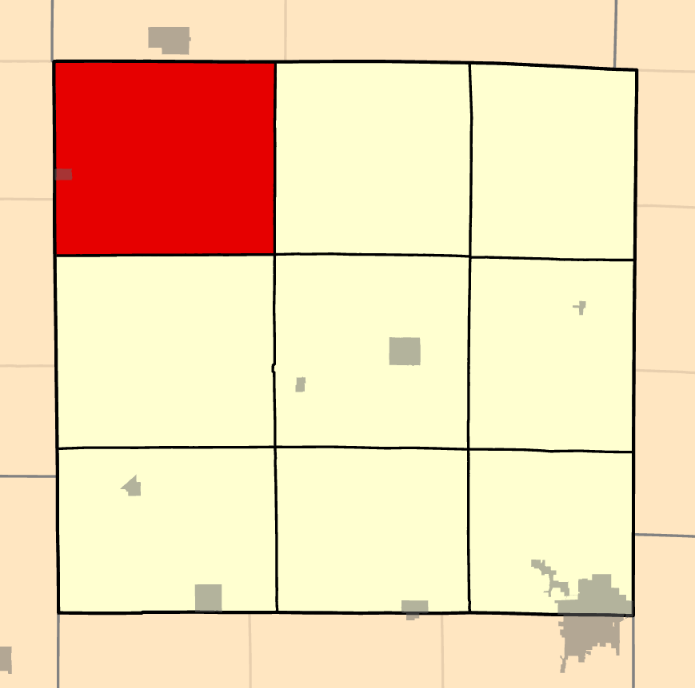
- Coordinates: 39°59′04″N 94°31′56″W
- Country: United States
- State: Missouri
- County: DeKalb

Area
  - Total: 56.9 sq mi (147 km^{2})
  - Land: 56.51 sq mi (146.4 km^{2})
  - Water: 0.39 sq mi (1.0 km^{2}) 0.69%
- Elevation: 1,047 ft (319 m)

Population (2020)
  - Total: 737
  - Density: 13/sq mi (5.0/km^{2})
- FIPS code: 29-06358772
- GNIS feature ID: 766597

Polk Township is a township in DeKalb County, Missouri, United States. At the 2020 census, its population was 737.

Polk Township was established in 1845, taking its name from President James K. Polk.

== Transportation ==
The following highways travel through the township:

- U.S. Route 169
- Route 31
- Route E
- Route F
- Route H
- Route Z
