= Taylor, Missouri =

Unincorporated community in Missouri, U.S.

Coordinates: 39°56′17″N 91°31′26″W

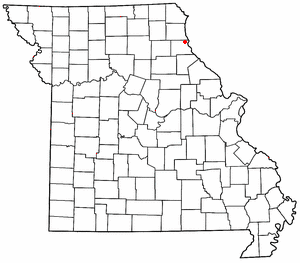

Taylor is an unincorporated community in northeastern Marion County, Missouri, United States. Taylor is located at the northern junction of U.S. Routes 24 and 61, approximately five miles west of Quincy, Illinois and eight miles north of Palmyra. The community is part of the Hannibal Micropolitan Statistical Area.

A post office called Taylor has been in operation since 1873. The community was named after Captain John Taylor, the proprietor of a local mill.
