= Dallas Township, DeKalb County, Missouri =

Township in Missouri, U.S.

Dallas Township
- Township
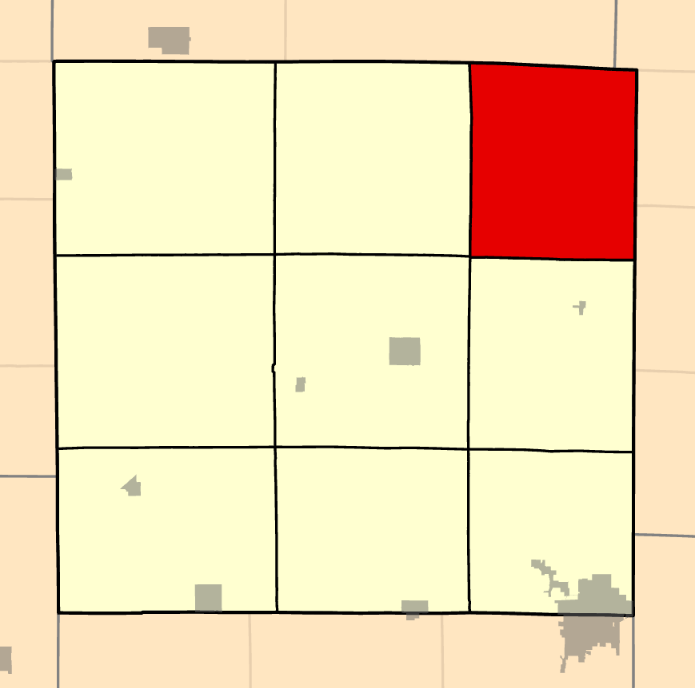
- Coordinates: 39°59′08″N 94°15′40″W
- Country: United States
- State: Missouri
- County: DeKalb

Area
  - Total: 42.41 sq mi (109.8 km^{2})
  - Land: 42.16 sq mi (109.2 km^{2})
  - Water: 0.25 sq mi (0.65 km^{2}) 0.59%
- Elevation: 909 ft (277 m)

Population (2020)
  - Total: 285
  - Density: 6.8/sq mi (2.6/km^{2})
- FIPS code: 29-06318046
- GNIS feature ID: 766594

Dallas Township is a township in DeKalb County, Missouri, United States. At the 2020 census, its population was 285.

Dallas Township was established in 1845, taking its name from Vice President George M. Dallas.

== Transportation ==
The following highways travel through the township:

- Route D
- Route E
- Route W
