= Fairport, Missouri =

Unincorporated community in DeKalb County, Missouri, United States

Coordinates: 39°59′16″N 94°20′46″W

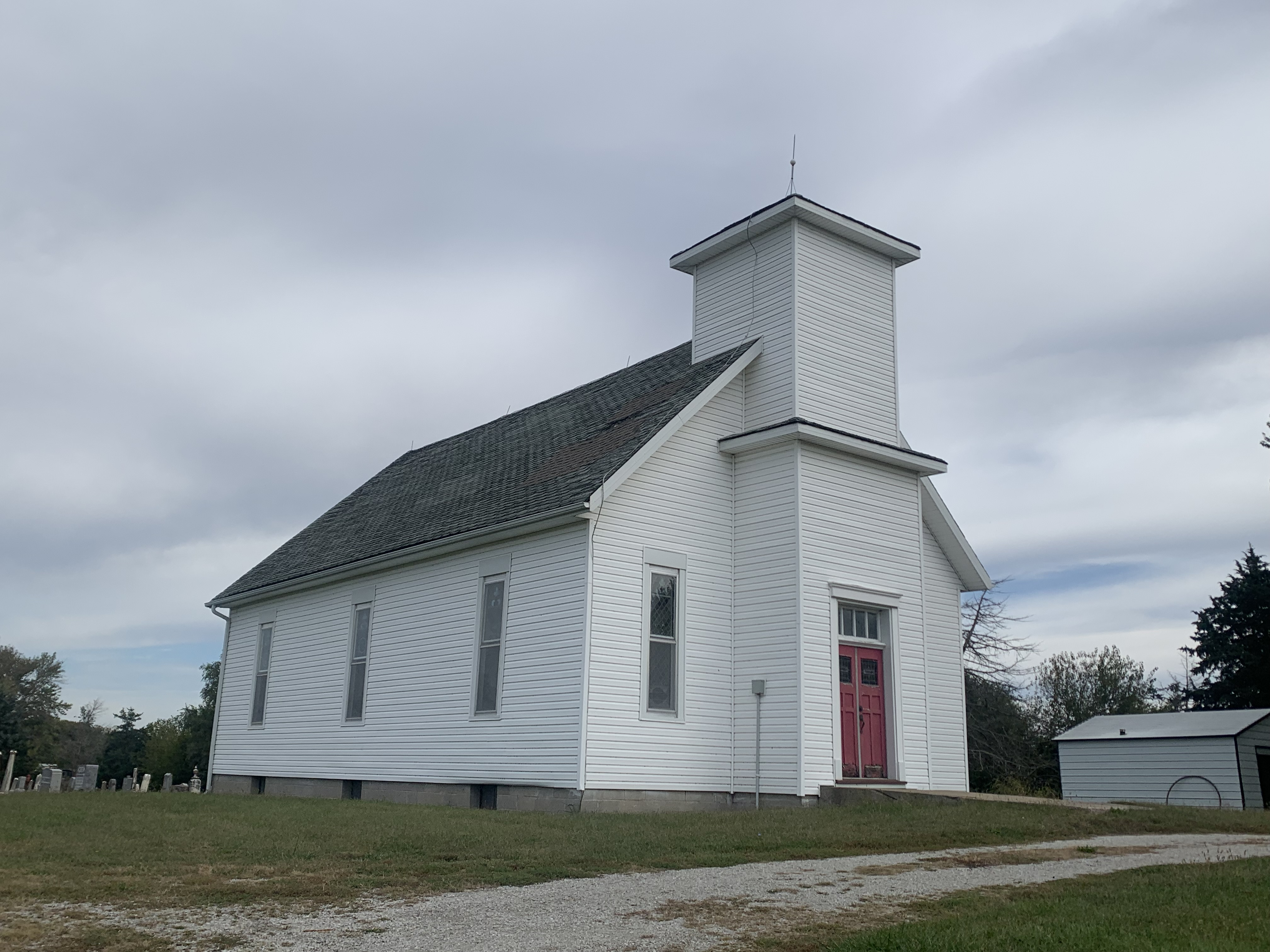
Methodist Church in Fairport, October 2025

Fairport is an unincorporated community in northeastern DeKalb County, Missouri, United States. The community is part of the St. Joseph, MO–KS Metropolitan Statistical Area.

Fairport is located at the intersection of Missouri Routes A and E approximately nine miles north of Maysville.

A post office called Fairport was established in 1869, and remained in operation until 1965. The community was named for the fair surroundings of the original town site.
