= Osborn, Missouri =

- City
- Location of Osborn, Missouri
- Coordinates: 39°44′59″N 94°21′24″W
- Country: United States
- State: Missouri
- Counties: DeKalb, Clinton

Area
  - Total: 0.57 sq mi (1.48 km^{2})
  - Land: 0.57 sq mi (1.48 km^{2})
  - Water: 0 sq mi (0.00 km^{2})
- Elevation: 1,030 ft (310 m)

Population (2020)
  - Total: 374
  - Density: 656.7/sq mi (253.54/km^{2})
- Time zone: UTC-6 (Central (CST))
  - Summer (DST): UTC-5 (CDT)
- ZIP code: 64474
- Area code: 816
- FIPS code: 29-55352
- GNIS feature ID: 2396091
- Website: osbornmo.gov

Osborn is a city in northern Clinton and southern DeKalb counties in the U.S. state of Missouri. The population was 374 at the 2020 census.

The Clinton County portion of Osborn is part of the Kansas City, MO–KS Metropolitan Statistical Area, while the DeKalb County portion is part of the St. Joseph, MO–KS Metropolitan Statistical Area. The Clinton County portion of Osborn lies in Platte Township, while the DeKalb County portion of Osborn lies in Colfax Township.

== History ==
Osborn got its start following the construction of the Hannibal and St. Joseph Railroad through that territory. It was named for Col. William Osborn of Waterville, New York. Col. Osborn, born in Sangerfield, New York on May 9, 1809, was an Oneida National Bank and Trust Company of Central New York commissioner and farmer who, in 1845, relocated to Missouri, where he partnered with the Hannibal and St. Joseph Railroad Company, the firm that constructed the Hannibal and St. Joseph Railroad.

== Education ==
The Osborn R-O School District includes Osborn. Osborn is home of the Wildcats and has orange and green as its school colors.

== Geography ==
According to the United States Census Bureau, the city has a total area of 0.57 square miles (1.48 km^{2}), all land.

Osborn is located south of U.S. Route 36.

== Demographics ==
Historical population
Census	Pop.	Note	%±
1880	412		—
1890	373		−9.5%
1900	386		3.5%
1910	360		−6.7%
1920	354		−1.7%
1930	381		7.6%
1940	315		−17.3%
1950	237		−24.8%
1960	274		15.6%
1970	338		23.4%
1980	381		12.7%
1990	400		5.0%
2000	455		13.8%
2010	423		−7.0%
2020	374		−11.6%
U.S. Decennial Census

=== 2010 census ===
As of the census of 2010, there were 423 people, 192 households, and 114 families living in the city. The population density was 742.1 inhabitants per square mile (286.5/km^{2}). There were 209 housing units at an average density of 366.7 units per square mile (141.6 units/km^{2}). The racial makeup of the city was 98.3% White, 0.7% Native American, 0.2% from other races, and 0.7% from two or more races. Hispanic or Latino of any race were 1.2% of the population.

There were 192 households, of which 23.4% had children under the age of 18 living with them, 45.8% were married couples living together, 9.9% had a female householder with no husband present, 3.6% had a male householder with no wife present, and 40.6% were non-families. 37.0% of all households were made up of individuals, and 13.6% had someone living alone who was 65 years of age or older. The average household size was 2.20 and the average family size was 2.86.

The median age in the city was 44.4 years. 20.1% of residents were under the age of 18; 10.2% were between the ages of 18 and 24; 20.4% were from 25 to 44; 30.7% were from 45 to 64; and 18.7% were 65 years of age or older. The gender makeup of the city was 49.6% male and 50.4% female.

=== 2000 census ===
At the 2000 census, there were 455 people, 183 households, and 129 families living in the city. The population density was 794.5 inhabitants per square mile (306.8/km^{2}). There were 195 housing units at an average density of 340.5 units per square mile (131.5 units/km^{2}). The racial makeup of the city was 98.90% White, 0.22% African American, and 0.88% from two or more races. Hispanic or Latino of any race were 0.44% of the population.

There were 183 households, of which 35.0% had children under the age of 18, 57.9% were married couples living together, 9.8% had a female householder with no husband present, and 29.5% were non-families. 26.8% of all households were made up of individuals, and 14.2% had someone living alone who was 65 years of age or older. The average household size was 2.49 and the average family size was 3.03.

The age distribution was 28.8% under the age of 18, 8.1% from 18 to 24, 25.1% from 25 to 44, 22.4% from 45 to 64, and 15.6% who were 65 years of age or older. The median age was 37 years. For every 100 females, there were 86.5 males. For every 100 females age 18 and over, there were 88.4 males.

The median income for a household in the city was $32,344, and the median income for a family was $44,205. Males had a median income of $29,792 versus $18,214 for females. The per capita income for the city was $16,230. About 4.0% of families and 9.9% of the population were below the poverty line, including 11.5% of those under age 18 and 25.8% of those age 65 or over.
