= Clarksdale, Missouri =

- City
- Location of Clarksdale, Missouri
- Coordinates: 39°49′00″N 94°33′03″W
- Country: United States
- State: Missouri
- County: DeKalb

Area
  - Total: 0.32 sq mi (0.84 km^{2})
  - Land: 0.32 sq mi (0.84 km^{2})
  - Water: 0 sq mi (0.00 km^{2})
- Elevation: 945 ft (288 m)

Population (2020)
  - Total: 245
  - Density: 756.5/sq mi (292.09/km^{2})
- Time zone: UTC-6 (Central (CST))
  - Summer (DST): UTC-5 (CDT)
- ZIP code: 64430
- Area code: 816
- FIPS code: 29-14158
- GNIS feature ID: 2393541
- Website: clarksdale-mo.com

Clarksdale is a city in southwest DeKalb County, Missouri, United States, located along the Little Third Fork of the Platte River. The population was 245 at the 2020 census. It is part of the St. Joseph metropolitan area.

== History ==
Clarksdale was platted in 1885 when the railroad was extended to that point. The community was named after John F. Clark, the original owner of the town site. A post office has been in operation at Clarksdale since 1886.

== Geography ==
According to the United States Census Bureau, the city has a total area of 0.32 square miles (0.83 km^{2}), all land.

== Demographics ==
Historical population
| Census | Pop. | Note | %± |
|---|---|---|---|
| 1890 | 145 | | — |
| 1900 | 834 | | 475.2% |
| 1910 | 416 | | −50.1% |
| 1920 | 375 | | −9.9% |
| 1930 | 302 | | −19.5% |
| 1940 | 307 | | 1.7% |
| 1950 | 282 | | −8.1% |
| 1960 | 242 | | −14.2% |
| 1970 | 248 | | 2.5% |
| 1980 | 278 | | 12.1% |
| 1990 | 287 | | 3.2% |
| 2000 | 351 | | 22.3% |
| 2010 | 271 | | −22.8% |
| 2020 | 245 | | −9.6% |
U.S. Decennial Census

=== 2010 census ===
As of the census of 2010, there were 271 people, 129 households, and 71 families residing in the city. The population density was 846.9 inhabitants per square mile (327.0/km^{2}). There were 145 housing units at an average density of 453.1 per square mile (174.9/km^{2}). The racial makeup of the city was 98.9% White, 0.4% Native American, and 0.7% from two or more races. Hispanic or Latino of any race were 1.5% of the population.

There were 129 households, of which 19.4% had children under the age of 18 living with them, 45.0% were married couples living together, 4.7% had a female householder with no husband present, 5.4% had a male householder with no wife present, and 45.0% were non-families. 41.9% of all households were made up of individuals, and 17% had someone living alone who was 65 years of age or older. The average household size was 2.10 and the average family size was 2.83.

The median age in the city was 43.6 years. 18.5% of residents were under the age of 18; 10.2% were between the ages of 18 and 24; 23.3% were from 25 to 44; 31% were from 45 to 64; and 17% were 65 years of age or older. The gender makeup of the city was 52.0% male and 48.0% female.

=== 2000 census ===
As of the census of 2000, there were 351 people, 142 households, and 89 families residing in the city. The population density was 1,097.1 inhabitants per square mile (423.6/km^{2}). There were 151 housing units at an average density of 472.0 per square mile (182.2/km^{2}). The racial makeup of the city was 98.58% White, 1.14% from other races, and 0.28% from two or more races. Hispanic or Latino of any race were 1.14% of the population.

There were 142 households, out of which 33.1% had children under the age of 18 living with them, 53.5% were married couples living together, 5.6% had a female householder with no husband present, and 37.3% were non-families. 34.5% of all households were made up of individuals, and 19.7% had someone living alone who was 65 years of age or older. The average household size was 2.47 and the average family size was 3.19.

In the city the population was spread out, with 28.8% under the age of 18, 9.4% from 18 to 24, 28.8% from 25 to 44, 20.2% from 45 to 64, and 12.8% who were 65 years of age or older. The median age was 34 years. For every 100 females, there were 101.7 males. For every 100 females age 18 and over, there were 104.9 males.

The median income for a household in the city was $34,375, and the median income for a family was $39,000. Males had a median income of $32,727 versus $14,375 for females. The per capita income for the city was $13,394. About 8.0% of families and 9.7% of the population were below the poverty line, including 10.8% of those under age 18 and 19.1% of those age 65 or over.

== Education ==
It is in the Maysville R-I School District.
