= Union Star, Missouri =

- City
- Location of Union Star, Missouri
- Coordinates: 39°58′46″N 94°35′56″W
- Country: United States
- State: Missouri
- County: DeKalb

Area
  - Total: 0.26 sq mi (0.68 km^{2})
  - Land: 0.26 sq mi (0.68 km^{2})
  - Water: 0 sq mi (0.00 km^{2})
- Elevation: 971 ft (296 m)

Population (2020)
  - Total: 380
  - Density: 1,451/sq mi (560.3/km^{2})
- Time zone: UTC-6 (Central (CST))
  - Summer (DST): UTC-5 (CDT)
- ZIP code: 64494
- Area code: 816
- FIPS code: 29-75130
- GNIS feature ID: 2397704
- Website: cityofunionstar.us

Union Star is a city in northwest DeKalb County, Missouri, United States, along the Third Fork Platte River. The population was 380 at the 2020 census. It is part of the St. Joseph, MO–KS Metropolitan Statistical Area.

== History ==
A post office called Union Star has been in operation since 1863. The city most likely was named for the fact a large share of the local residents were pro-Union during the Civil War.

== Geography ==
Union Star is located in the Polk township of DeKalb County on the border with Andrew County. Union Star is 20 miles from Saint Joseph and Exit 50 on Interstate 29, on U.S. Highway 169.

According to the United States Census Bureau, the city has a total area of 0.26 square miles (0.67 km^{2}), all land.

== Demographics ==
Historical population
| Census | Pop. | Note | %± |
|---|---|---|---|
| 1880 | 72 | | — |
| 1890 | 272 | | 277.8% |
| 1900 | 439 | | 61.4% |
| 1910 | 388 | | −11.6% |
| 1920 | 434 | | 11.9% |
| 1930 | 414 | | −4.6% |
| 1940 | 411 | | −0.7% |
| 1950 | 373 | | −9.2% |
| 1960 | 392 | | 5.1% |
| 1970 | 417 | | 6.4% |
| 1980 | 423 | | 1.4% |
| 1990 | 432 | | 2.1% |
| 2000 | 433 | | 0.2% |
| 2010 | 437 | | 0.9% |
| 2020 | 380 | | −13.0% |
U.S. Decennial Census

=== 2010 census ===
As of the census of 2010, there were 437 people, 175 households, and 123 families residing in the city. The population density was 1,680.8 inhabitants per square mile (649.0/km^{2}). There were 203 housing units at an average density of 780.8 per square mile (301.5/km^{2}). The racial makeup of the city was 98.2% White, 0.2% Asian, and 1.6% from two or more races. Hispanic or Latino of any race were 0.2% of the population.

There were 175 households, of which 33.1% had children under the age of 18 living with them, 54.9% were married couples living together, 10.9% had a female householder with no husband present, 4.6% had a male householder with no wife present, and 29.7% were non-families. 27.4% of all households were made up of individuals, and 17.1% had someone living alone who was 65 years of age or older. The average household size was 2.50 and the average family size was 2.99.

The median age in the city was 37.6 years. 25.9% of residents were under the age of 18; 7.9% were between the ages of 18 and 24; 24.7% were from 25 to 44; 24.7% were from 45 to 64; and 16.7% were 65 years of age or older. The gender makeup of the city was 52.6% male and 47.4% female.

=== 2000 census ===
As of the census of 2000, there were 433 people, 183 households, and 107 families residing in the town. The population density was 1,672.0 inhabitants per square mile (645.6/km^{2}). There were 199 housing units at an average density of 768.4 per square mile (296.7/km^{2}). The racial makeup of the town was 98.38% White and 1.62% Native American.

There were 183 households, out of which 33.9% had children under the age of 18 living with them, 50.8% were married couples living together, 7.1% had a female householder with no husband present, and 41.0% were non-families. 35.5% of all households were made up of individuals, and 19.7% had someone living alone who was 65 years of age or older. The average household size was 2.37 and the average family size was 3.15.

In the town the population was spread out, with 28.2% under the age of 18, 7.6% from 18 to 24, 30.7% from 25 to 44, 18.2% from 45 to 64, and 15.2% who were 65 years of age or older. The median age was 36 years. For every 100 females, there were 91.6 males. For every 100 females age 18 and over, there were 93.2 males.

The median income for a household in the town was $24,875, and the median income for a family was $33,523. Males had a median income of $26,719 versus $16,750 for females. The per capita income for the town was $13,057. About 6.2% of families and 8.6% of the population were below the poverty line, including 4.8% of those under age 18 and 7.7% of those age 65 or over.

== Education ==
It is in the Union Star R-II School District.
