= Missouri Route 6 =

State highway in Missouri, U.S.

Route 6

Route information
- Maintained by MoDOT
- Length: 211 mi (340 km)
- Existed: 1922–present

Major junctions
- West end: I-29 BL / US 169 in St. Joseph
- I-29 in St. Joseph; I-35 north of Winston; US 69 west of Altamont; US 65 in Trenton; US 63 / Route 11 in Kirksville
- East end: US 24 / US 61 south of Taylor

Location
- Country: United States
- State: Missouri

Highway system
- Missouri State Highway System; Interstate; US; State; Supplemental
| ← Route 5 | → Route 7 |

Route 6 is a 211-mile-long (340 km) state highway in the northern part of the U.S. state of Missouri. It travels from I-29 Bus./US 169 in St. Joseph to US 24/US 61 about 6 miles (9.7 km) west of Quincy, Illinois. The highway serves as a major east-west corridor in northern Missouri, south of US 136 and north of US 36. It is one of the original 1922 highways in Missouri.

== Route description ==
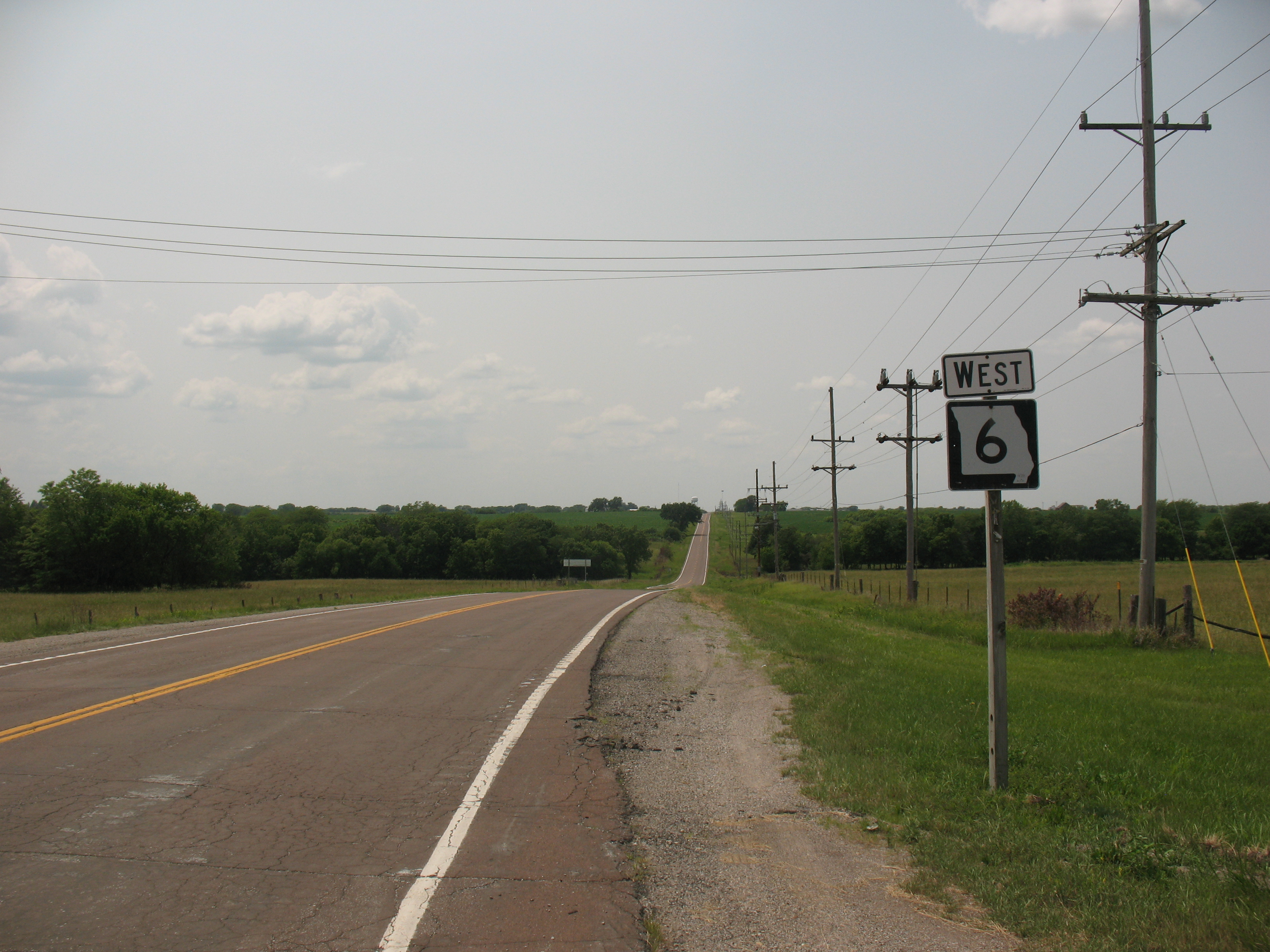
MO 6 Westbound after its concurrency with U.S. Route 69 near Altamont

Beginning at I-29 Bus. and US 169 in St. Joseph, Route 6 travels eastward through Buchanan County. Shortly after its starting point, the highway intersects I-29 at exit 47 before continuing east into DeKalb County. In DeKalb County, Route 6 overlaps with Route 31 for a short distance before passing through Maysville, where it intersects Route 33.

Continuing eastward, Route 6 enters Daviess County, where it crosses I-35 at exit 64 near Winston. The highway then runs concurrent with US 69 for a brief stretch before reaching Gallatin, where it intersects Route 13. East of Gallatin, Route 6 passes through rural areas before entering Grundy County, where it intersects US 65 in Trenton.

Leaving Trenton, Route 6 continues eastward into Sullivan County, where it intersects Route 5 in Milan. The highway then enters Adair County, passing through Novinger before reaching Kirksville. In Kirksville, Route 6 intersects US 63 and Route 11, forming a brief concurrency before separating again east of the city.

East of Kirksville, Route 6 enters Knox County, where it intersects Route 15 near Edina. The highway continues eastward through Lewis County, passing through La Belle and Lewistown before reaching Marion County. In Marion County, Route 6 intersects US 24 and US 61 near Taylor, marking its eastern terminus approximately six miles west of Quincy, Illinois.

== History ==
Route 6 was one of the original Missouri state highways formed in 1922, and construction continues into the mid-1920s. Originally it was a gravel or earthen surface with the most developed portions being around Trenton and Milan. By 1955, the highway was fully paved across the state.

== Major intersections ==
| County | Location | mi | km | Destinations | Notes |
|---|---|---|---|---|---|
| Buchanan | St. Joseph | 0.0 | 0.0 | I-29 BL / US 169 (Belt Highway / Frederick Boulevard) | |
| Buchanan | St. Joseph | 0.5 | 0.80 | I-29 / US 71 – Council Bluffs, Kansas City | I-29 exit 47 |
| DeKalb | | 13.0 | 20.9 | Route 31 south to US 36 | west end of Route 31 overlap |
| DeKalb | Oak | 22.9 | 36.9 | Route 31 north – King City | east end of Route 31 overlap |
| DeKalb | Maysville | 32.0 | 51.5 | Route 33 south / Route A north | |
| Daviess | | 43.7 | 70.3 | I-35 – Bethany, Des Moines, Cameron, Kansas City | I-35 exit 64 |
| Daviess | | 45.7 | 73.5 | US 69 north – Pattonsburg | west end of US 69 overlap |
| Daviess | | 46.8 | 75.3 | US 69 south – Winston | east end of US 69 overlap |
| Daviess | Gallatin | 55.3 | 89.0 | Route 13 south – Hamilton | west end of Route 13 overlap |
| Daviess | | 56.9 | 91.6 | Route 13 north – Jameson | east end of Route 13 overlap |
| Daviess | | 66.0 | 106.2 | Route 190 – Edinburg, Jamesport | |
| Grundy | | 75.0 | 120.7 | Route 146 west / Route W south – Edinburg, Hickory, Crowder State Park | |
| Grundy | Trenton | 78.9 | 127.0 | US 65 Bus. north (Oklahoma Avenue) | west end of US 65 Bus. overlap |
| Grundy | Trenton | 79.0 | 127.1 | US 65 – Princeton, Chillicothe | interchange; east end of US 65 Bus. overlap |
| Grundy | | 92.4 | 148.7 | Route 139 north – Osgood | west end of Route 139 overlap |
| Sullivan | Humphreys | 95.2 | 153.2 | Route 139 south – Meadville | east end of Route 139 overlap |
| Sullivan | | 104.4 | 168.0 | Route 5 south – Linneus | west end of Route 5 overlap |
| Sullivan | | 107.6 | 173.2 | Route 5 Bus. north – Milan | |
| Sullivan | Milan | 110.3 | 177.5 | Route 5 Bus. south | |
| Sullivan | Milan | 110.5 | 177.8 | Route 5 north – Unionville | east end of Route 5 overlap |
| Sullivan | Green City | 119.7 | 192.6 | Route 129 – Green City, Winigan | |
| Adair | | 127.7 | 205.5 | Route 149 south to Route 11 | west end of Route 149 overlap |
| Adair | Novinger | 133.7 | 215.2 | Route 149 north – Connelsville | east end of Route 149 overlap |
| Adair | | 137.5 | 221.3 | Route 157 south – Thousand Hills State Park | |
| Adair | Kirksville | 140.8 | 226.6 | US 63 Bus. north – Lancaster | west end of US 63 Bus. overlap |
| Adair | Kirksville | 142.4 | 229.2 | US 63 Bus. – Macon | east end of US 63 Bus. overlap |
| Adair | Kirksville | 143.4 | 230.8 | US 63 north / Route 11 north – Lancaster, Adair | west end of US 63/MO 11 overlap |
| Adair | Kirksville | 145.4 | 234.0 | US 63 south / Route 11 south – Macon, Kirksville | east end of US 63/MO 11 overlap |
| Knox | | 166.5 | 268.0 | Route 15 south – Plevna | west end of Route 15 overlap |
| Knox | Edina | 167.4 | 269.4 | Route 15 north – Memphis | east end of Route 15 overlap |
| Lewis | | 188.5 | 303.4 | Route 16 east – Monticello | |
| Lewis | Ewing | 195.5 | 314.6 | Route 156 west – Newark, Henry Sever Lake Conservation Area | |
| Lewis | | | | Outer Road - Taylor | |
| Marion | | 211 | 340 | US 24 / US 61 (Avenue of the Saints) – Canton, Quincy, IL, Palmyra, Hannibal | interchange |
1.000 mi = 1.609 km; 1.000 km = 0.621 mi: Concurrency terminus
