= DeKalb County, Missouri =

County in Missouri, United States

- County
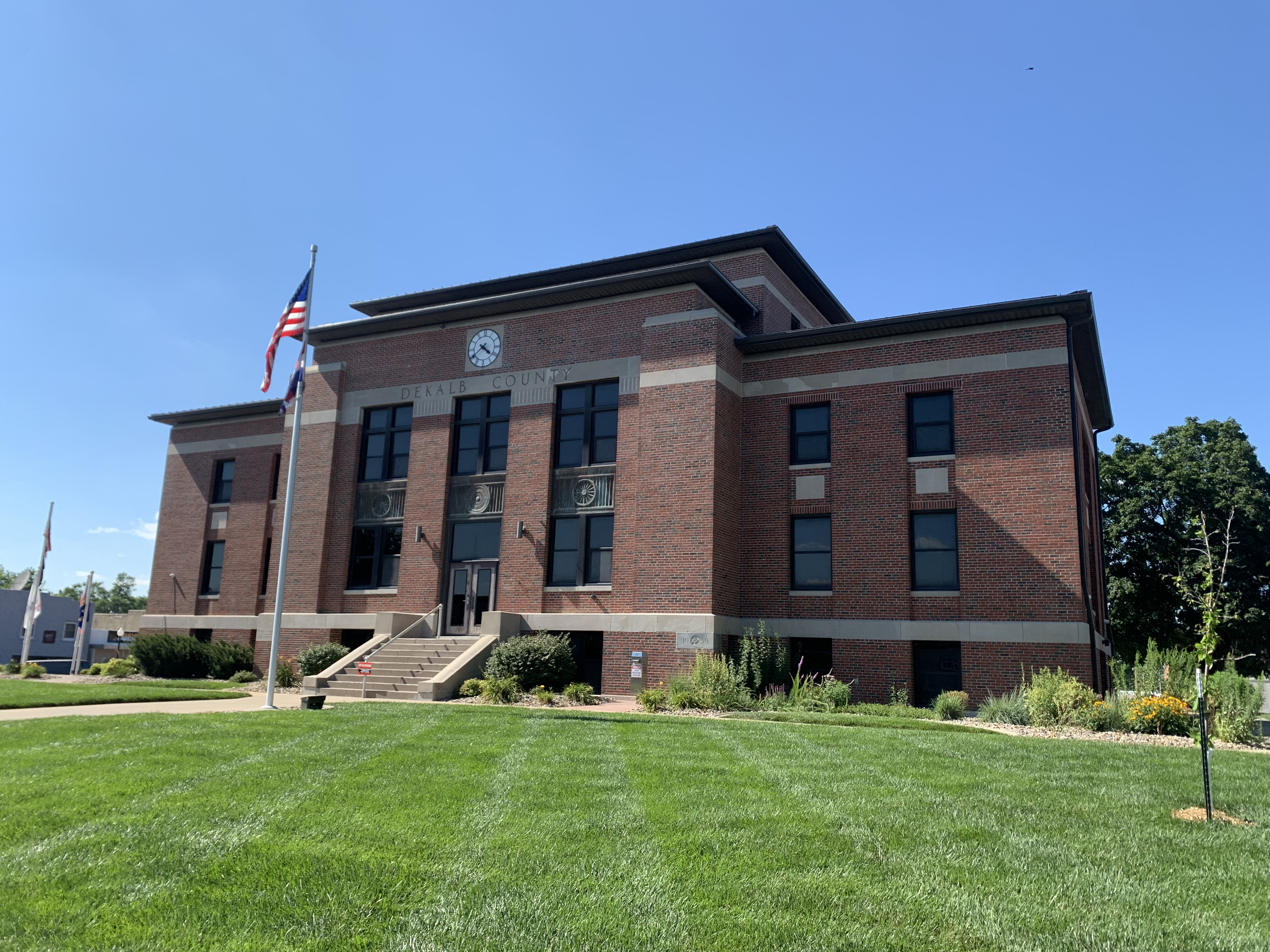
- DeKalb County Courthouse in Maysville

- Location within the U.S. state of Missouri
- Coordinates: 39°54′N 94°24′W
- Country: United States
- State: Missouri
- Founded: February 25, 1845
- Named for: Johann de Kalb
- Seat: Maysville
- Largest city: Cameron

Area
  - Total: 426 sq mi (1,100 km^{2})
  - Land: 421 sq mi (1,090 km^{2})
  - Water: 4.5 sq mi (12 km^{2}) 1.0%

Population (2020)
  - Total: 11,029
  - Estimate (2025): 9,795 ▼
  - Density: 26.2/sq mi (10.1/km^{2})
- Time zone: UTC−6 (Central)
  - Summer (DST): UTC−5 (CDT)
- Congressional district: 6th
- Website: www.dekalbcountymo.com

DeKalb County is a county located in the northwest portion of the U.S. state of Missouri. As of the 2020 census, the population was 11,029. Its county seat is Maysville. The county was organized February 25, 1845 and named for General Johann de Kalb, Baron de Kalb, of the Revolutionary War. DeKalb County is part of the St. Joseph, MO-KS Metropolitan Statistical Area, which is also included in the Kansas City-Overland Park-Kansas City, MO-KS Combined Statistical Area.

== Geography ==
According to the U.S. Census Bureau, the county has a total area of 426 square miles (1,100 km^{2}), of which 421 square miles (1,090 km^{2}) is land and 4.5 square miles (12 km^{2}) (1.0%) is water.

=== Adjacent counties ===
- Gentry County (north)
- Daviess County (east)
- Caldwell County (southeast)
- Clinton County (south)
- Buchanan County (southwest)
- Andrew County (west)

=== Major highways ===
- Interstate 35
- U.S. Route 36
- U.S. Route 69
- U.S. Route 169
- Route 6
- Route 31
- Route 33
- Route 110 (Chicago–Kansas City Expressway)

=== Transit ===
- Jefferson Lines

== Demographics ==
Historical population
Census	Pop.	Note	%±
1850	2,075		—
1860	5,224		151.8%
1870	9,858		88.7%
1880	13,334		35.3%
1890	14,539		9.0%
1900	14,418		−0.8%
1910	12,531		−13.1%
1920	11,694		−6.7%
1930	10,270		−12.2%
1940	9,751		−5.1%
1950	8,047		−17.5%
1960	7,226		−10.2%
1970	7,305		1.1%
1980	8,222		12.6%
1990	9,967		21.2%
2000	11,597		16.4%
2010	12,892		11.2%
2020	11,029		−14.5%
2025 (est.)	9,795	▼	−11.2%
U.S. Decennial Census; 1790-1960 1900-1990; 1990-2000 2010-2015

=== 2020 census ===
As of the 2020 census, the county had a population of 11,029. The median age was 42.2 years; 19.1% of residents were under the age of 18 and 18.6% of residents were 65 years of age or older. For every 100 females there were 133.9 males, and for every 100 females age 18 and over there were 141.7 males age 18 and over.

30.1% of residents lived in urban areas, while 69.9% lived in rural areas.

There were 3,814 households in the county, of which 29.1% had children under the age of 18 living with them and 24.9% had a female householder with no spouse or partner present. About 29.2% of all households were made up of individuals and 15.0% had someone living alone who was 65 years of age or older.

There were 4,264 housing units, of which 10.6% were vacant. Among occupied housing units, 71.1% were owner-occupied and 28.9% were renter-occupied. The homeowner vacancy rate was 0.6% and the rental vacancy rate was 11.2%.

=== Racial and ethnic composition ===
As of the 2020 census, the racial makeup of the county was 88.7% White, 6.1% Black or African American, 0.3% American Indian and Alaska Native, 0.4% Asian, 0.0% Native Hawaiian and Pacific Islander, 0.5% from some other race, and 4.0% from two or more races. Hispanic or Latino residents of any race comprised 2.1% of the population. The accompanying table presents the county's racial and ethnic counts for 1980 through 2020, with the 2020 share highlighted.

DeKalb County, Missouri – Racial and ethnic composition Note: the US Census treats Hispanic/Latino as an ethnic category. This table excludes Latinos from the racial categories and assigns them to a separate category. Hispanics/Latinos may be of any race.
Race / Ethnicity (NH = Non-Hispanic)	Pop 1980	Pop 1990	Pop 2000	Pop 2010	Pop 2020	% 1980	% 1990	% 2000	% 2010	% 2020
White alone (NH)	8,149	8,934	10,250	11,045	9,653	99.11%	89.64%	88.38%	85.67%	87.52%
Black or African American alone (NH)	0	729	1,020	1,454	672	0.00%	7.31%	8.80%	11.28%	6.09%
Native American or Alaska Native alone (NH)	13	65	74	49	30	0.16%	0.65%	0.64%	0.38%	0.27%
Asian alone (NH)	9	31	20	31	42	0.11%	0.31%	0.17%	0.24%	0.38%
Native Hawaiian or Pacific Islander alone (NH)	x	x	0	12	2	x	x	0.00%	0.09%	0.02%
Other race alone (NH)	5	8	10	0	24	0.06%	0.08%	0.09%	0.00%	0.22%
Mixed race or Multiracial (NH)	x	x	98	82	379	x	x	0.85%	0.64%	3.44%
Hispanic or Latino (any race)	46	200	125	219	227	0.56%	2.01%	1.08%	1.70%	2.06%
Total	8,222	9,967	11,597	12,892	11,029	100.00%	100.00%	100.00%	100.00%	100.00%

=== 2000 census ===
As of the census of 2000, there were 11,597 people, 3,528 households and 2,473 families residing in the county. The population density was 27 inhabitants per square mile (10/km^{2}). There were 3,839 housing units at an average density of 9 units per square mile (3.5/km^{2}). The racial makeup of the county was 89.09% White, 8.86% Black or African American, 0.66% Native American, 0.17% Asian, 0.01% Pacific Islander, 0.27% from other races and 0.93% from two or more races. Approximately 1.08% of the population were Hispanic or Latino of any race.

There were 3,528 households, out of which 32.40% had children under the age of 18 living with them, 9.60% were married couples living together, 7.40% had a female householder with no husband present and 29.90% were non-families. 26.90% of all households were made up of individuals, and 14.70% had someone living alone who was 65 years of age or older. The average household size was 2.50 and the average family size was 3.04.

In the county, the population was spread out, with 20.70% under the age of 18, 8.20% from 18 to 24, 36.30% from 25 to 44, 20.90% from 45 to 64 and 13.90% who were 65 years of age or older. The median age was 38 years. For every 100 females, there were 152.30 males. For every 100 females age 18 and over, there were 168.10 males.

The median income for a household in the county was $31,654 and the median income for a family was $37,329. Males had a median income of $28,434 versus $20,207 for females. The per capita income for the county was $12,687. About 7.20% of families and 10.80% of the population were below the poverty line, including 10.80% of those under age 18 and 75.20% of those age 65 or over.

=== Religion ===
According to the Association of Religion Data Archives County Membership Report (2010), DeKalb County is sometimes regarded as being on the northern edge of the Bible Belt, with evangelical Protestantism being the most predominant religion. The most predominant denominations among residents in DeKalb County who adhere to a religion are Southern Baptists (37.63%), United Methodists (19.88%) and Community of Christ (14.82%).

== Education ==
School districts which have portions of the county include:

- Cameron R-I School District
- East Buchanan County C-1 School District
- King City R-I School District
- Maysville R-I School District
- Osborn R-O School District
- Pattonsburg R-II School District
- Stewartsville C-2 School District
- Union Star R-II School District
- Winston R-VI School District

=== Public Schools ===
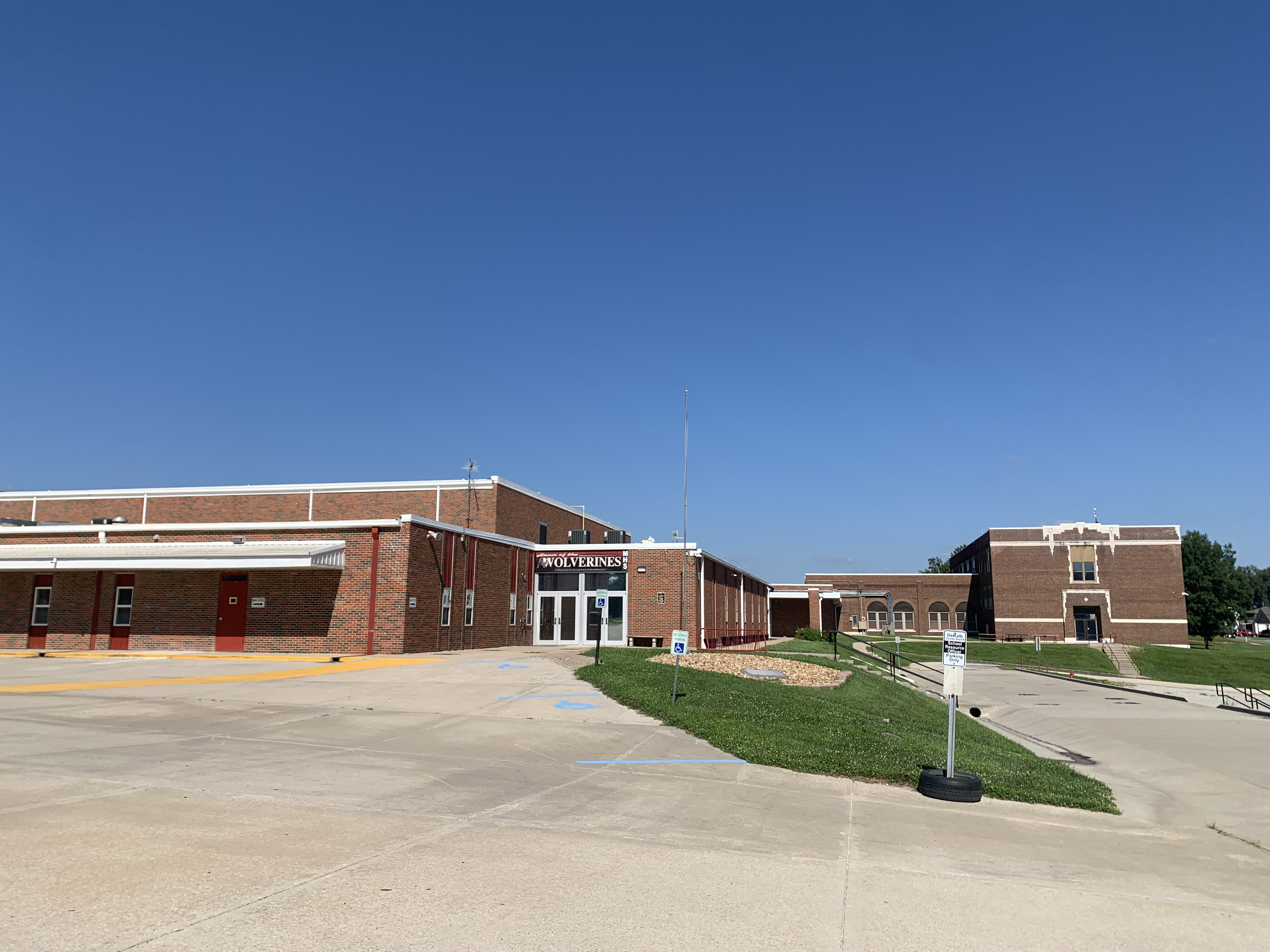
Maysville R-I School

- Maysville R-I School District – Maysville
  - Maysville Elementary School (K-06)
  - Maysville Junior/Senior High School (07-12)
- Osborn R-0 School District – Osborn
  - Osborn Elementary School (K-06)
  - Osborn Senior High School (07-12)
- Stewartsville C-2 School District – Stewartsville
  - Stewartsville Elementary School (K-06)
  - Stewartsville Senior High School (07-12)
- Union Star R-II School District – Union Star
  - Union Star Elementary School (K-06)
  - Union Star Senior High School (07-12)

=== Public libraries ===
- Cameron Public Library
- DeKalb County Public Library

== Communities ==
=== Cities ===
- Cameron
- Clarksdale
- Maysville (county seat)
- Osborn
- Stewartsville
- Union Star

=== Villages ===
- Amity
- Weatherby

=== Unincorporated Community ===
- Alta Vista
- Fairport
- Santa Rosa

=== Extinct Places ===
- Bayfield
- Boxford
- Fordham
- Oak
- Orchid
- Winslow
- Wood

=== Townships ===
- Adams
- Camden
- Colfax
- Dallas
- Grand River
- Grant
- Polk
- Sherman
- Washington

== Politics ==
=== Local ===
The Republican Party controls politics at the local level in DeKalb County.

DeKalb County, Missouri

Elected countywide officials
Assessor	Tanya Zimmerman	Republican
Circuit Clerk	Julie Whitsell	Republican
County Clerk	Melissa (Missy) Meek	Republican
Collector	Jessica Lee	Republican
Commissioner (presiding)	Kyle Carroll	Republican
Commissioner (district 1)	Chet Owen	Republican
Commissioner (district 2)	Kyle White	Republican
Coroner	Heath Turner	Republican
Prosecuting Attorney	Erik C. Tate	Republican
Public Administrator	Connie Bray	Republican
Recorder	Ashley Johnson	Republican
Sheriff	Kasey Keesaman	Republican
Treasurer	Jessica Lee	Republican

=== State ===
Past Gubernatorial Elections Results
Year	Republican	Democratic	Third Parties
2024	78.84% 3,744	18.47% 877	2.79% 128
2020	78.14% 3,763	19.31% 930	2.55% 123
2016	66.63% 3,061	30.76% 1,413	2.61% 120
2012	55.06% 2,394	41.74% 1,815	3.20% 139
2008	50.13% 2,332	46.80% 2,177	3.07% 143
2004	57.93% 2,710	40.40% 1,890	1.67% 78
2000	52.93% 2,129	44.70% 1,798	2.37% 95
1996	34.11% 1,317	63.30% 2,444	2.59% 100

DeKalb County is a part of Missouri's 2nd District in the Missouri House of Representatives and is represented by Mazzie Boyd (R-Hamilton).

Missouri House of Representatives — District 2 — DeKalb County (2020)
Party	Candidate	Votes	%	±%
Republican	J. Eggleston	3,905	82.35%	−17.65
Democratic	Mindi Smith	837	17.65%	+17.65

Missouri House of Representatives — District 2 — DeKalb County (2018)
Party	Candidate	Votes	%	±%
Republican	J. Eggleston	3,349	100.00%	±0.00

DeKalb County is a part of Missouri's 12th District in the Missouri Senate and is currently represented by Rusty Black (R-Chillicothe).

Missouri Senate - District 12 – DeKalb County (2018)
Party	Candidate	Votes	%	±%
Republican	Dan Hegeman	2,899	78.27%	−21.73
Democratic	Terry Richard	805	21.73%	+21.73

Missouri Senate - District 12 – DeKalb County (2014)
Party	Candidate	Votes	%	±%
Republican	Dan Hegeman	2,300	100.00%	

=== Federal ===
All of DeKalb County is included in Missouri's 6th Congressional District and is currently represented by Sam Graves (R-Tarkio) in the U.S. House of Representatives. Graves was elected to an eleventh term in 2020 over Democratic challenger Gena Ross.

U.S. House of Representatives – Missouri’s 6th Congressional District – DeKalb County (2020)
Party	Candidate	Votes	%	±%
Republican	Sam Graves	3,840	80.42%	+2.68
Democratic	Gena L. Ross	820	17.17%	−1.13
Libertarian	Jim Higgins	115	2.41%	−1.55

U.S. House of Representatives – Missouri's 6th Congressional District – DeKalb County (2018)
Party	Candidate	Votes	%	±%
Republican	Sam Graves	2,923	77.74%	+1.32
Democratic	Henry Robert Martin	688	18.30%	−1.72
Libertarian	Dan Hogan	149	3.96%	+1.48

Daviess County, along with the rest of the state of Missouri, is represented in the U.S. Senate by Josh Hawley (R-Columbia) and Roy Blunt (R-Strafford).

U.S. Senate — Class I — DeKalb County (2018)
Party	Candidate	Votes	%	±%
Republican	Josh Hawley	2,584	68.52%	+21.97
Democratic	Claire McCaskill	1,011	26.81%	−18.23
Independent	Craig O'Dear	98	2.60%	
Libertarian	Japheth Campbell	58	1.54%	−6.87
Green	Jo Crain	20	0.53%	+0.53

U.S. Senate — Class III — DeKalb County (2016)
Party	Candidate	Votes	%	±%
Republican	Roy Blunt	2,826	61.83%	+15.28
Democratic	Jason Kander	1,478	32.33%	−12.71
Libertarian	Jonathan Dine	146	3.19%	−5.22
Green	Johnathan McFarland	50	1.09%	+1.09
Constitution	Fred Ryman	71	1.55%	+1.55

==== Political culture ====
United States presidential election results for DeKalb County, Missouri
Year	Republican		Democratic		Third party(ies)	
Year	No.	%	No.	%	No.	%
1888	1,598	48.57%	1,573	47.81%	119	3.62%
1892	1,339	41.61%	1,372	42.64%	507	15.76%
1896	1,590	42.00%	2,167	57.24%	29	0.77%
1900	1,669	46.21%	1,840	50.94%	103	2.85%
1904	1,768	51.23%	1,607	46.57%	76	2.20%
1908	1,703	50.53%	1,632	48.43%	35	1.04%
1912	1,090	33.11%	1,652	50.18%	550	16.71%
1916	1,640	49.22%	1,647	49.43%	45	1.35%
1920	3,001	57.83%	2,121	40.87%	67	1.29%
1924	2,730	52.58%	2,368	45.61%	94	1.81%
1928	3,338	63.53%	1,898	36.12%	18	0.34%
1932	1,747	40.74%	2,519	58.75%	22	0.51%
1936	2,872	51.56%	2,680	48.11%	18	0.32%
1940	3,072	54.93%	2,505	44.79%	16	0.29%
1944	2,658	57.47%	1,961	42.40%	6	0.13%
1948	2,098	50.74%	2,033	49.17%	4	0.10%
1952	3,073	63.28%	1,773	36.51%	10	0.21%
1956	2,538	57.55%	1,872	42.45%	0	0.00%
1960	2,484	59.41%	1,697	40.59%	0	0.00%
1964	1,679	41.70%	2,347	58.30%	0	0.00%
1968	2,112	54.87%	1,452	37.72%	285	7.40%
1972	2,766	67.38%	1,339	32.62%	0	0.00%
1976	1,739	46.02%	2,023	53.53%	17	0.45%
1980	2,062	53.08%	1,677	43.17%	146	3.76%
1984	2,188	59.91%	1,464	40.09%	0	0.00%
1988	1,863	48.48%	1,970	51.26%	10	0.26%
1992	1,318	31.60%	1,630	39.08%	1,223	29.32%
1996	1,627	42.30%	1,679	43.66%	540	14.04%
2000	2,363	58.36%	1,562	38.58%	124	3.06%
2004	2,941	62.76%	1,707	36.43%	38	0.81%
2008	2,889	61.29%	1,692	35.89%	133	2.82%
2012	3,056	70.25%	1,194	27.45%	100	2.30%
2016	3,540	76.52%	824	17.81%	262	5.66%
2020	3,828	79.04%	930	19.20%	85	1.76%
2024	3,885	80.70%	870	18.07%	59	1.23%

At the presidential level, DeKalb County is solidly Republican. Donald Trump carried the county easily in 2016 and 2020. Bill Clinton was the last Democratic presidential nominee to carry DeKalb County in 1996. The last Democrat to win majority support from the county's voters was Michael Dukakis in 1988.

Like most rural areas throughout northwest Missouri, voters in DeKalb County generally adhere to socially and culturally conservative principles which tend to influence their Republican leanings, at least on the state and national levels. In 2004, Missourians voted on a constitutional amendment to define marriage as the union between a man and a woman—it overwhelmingly passed in DeKalb County with 80.7% of the vote. The initiative passed the state with 71% support from voters. In 2006, Missourians voted on a constitutional amendment to fund and legalize embryonic stem cell research in the state—it failed in DeKalb County with 55.9% voting against the measure. The initiative narrowly passed the state with 51% of support from voters as Missouri became one of the first states in the nation to approve embryonic stem cell research. Despite DeKalb County's longstanding tradition of supporting socially conservative platforms, voters in the county have a penchant for advancing populist causes like increasing the minimum wage. In 2006, Missourians voted on a proposition (Proposition B) to increase the minimum wage in the state to $6.50 an hour—it passed in DeKalb County with 67.7% of the vote. The proposition strongly passed every single county in Missouri with 78.99% voting in favor. (During the same election, voters in five other states also strongly approved increases in the minimum wage.) In 2018, Missourians voted on a proposition (Proposition A) concerning right to work, the outcome of which ultimately reversed the right to work legislation passed in the state the previous year. 65.70% of DeKalb County voters cast their ballots to overturn the law.

=== Missouri presidential preference primaries ===
==== 2020 ====
The 2020 presidential primaries for both the Democratic and Republican parties were held in Missouri on March 10. On the Democratic side, former Vice President Joe Biden (D-Delaware) both won statewide and carried DeKalb County by a wide margin. Biden went on to defeat President Donald Trump in the general election.

Missouri Democratic Presidential Primary – DeKalb County (2020)
Party	Candidate	Votes	%	±%
Democratic	Joe Biden	309	60.47	
Democratic	Bernie Sanders	162	31.70	
Democratic	Tulsi Gabbard	9	1.76	
Democratic	Others/Uncommitted	16	2.06	

Incumbent President Donald Trump (R-Florida) faced a primary challenge from former Massachusetts Governor Bill Weld, but won both Daviess County and statewide by large margins.

Missouri Republican Presidential Primary – DeKalb County (2020)
Party	Candidate	Votes	%	±%
Republican	Donald Trump	486	96.24	
Republican	Bill Weld	6	1.19	
Republican	Others/Uncommitted	13	2.57	

==== 2016 ====
The 2016 presidential primaries for both the Republican and Democratic parties were held in Missouri on March 15. Businessman Donald Trump (R-New York) narrowly won both DeKalb County and the state overall. He went on to win the presidency.

Missouri Republican Presidential Primary – DeKalb County (2016)
Party	Candidate	Votes	%	±%
Republican	Donald Trump	800	43.96	
Republican	Ted Cruz	720	39.56	
Republican	John Kasich	128	7.03	
Republican	Marco Rubio	105	5.77	
Republican	Others/Uncommitted	67	3.68	

On the Democratic side, former Secretary of State Hillary Clinton (D-New York) won statewide by a small margin, but lost DeKalb County to Senator Bernie Sanders (I-Vermont).

Missouri Democratic Presidential Primary – DeKalb County (2016)
Party	Candidate	Votes	%	±%
Democratic	Bernie Sanders	328	57.65	
Democratic	Hillary Clinton	223	39.19	
Democratic	Others/Uncommitted	18	3.16	

==== 2012 ====
In the 2012 Missouri Republican Presidential Primary, voters in DeKalb County supported former U.S. Senator Rick Santorum (R-Pennsylvania), who finished first in the state at large, but eventually lost the nomination to former Governor Mitt Romney (R-Massachusetts). Delegates to the state convention were chosen at a county caucus, which selected a delegation favoring Santorum.

==== 2008 ====
In 2008, the Missouri Republican Presidential Primary was closely contested, with Senator John McCain (R-Arizona) prevailing and eventually winning the nomination. Former Governor Mitt Romney (R-Massachusetts) won the vote in Caldwell County.

Missouri Republican Presidential Primary – DeKalb County (2008)
Party	Candidate	Votes	%	±%
Republican	Mitt Romney	337	32.85	
Republican	John McCain	310	30.21	
Republican	Mike Huckabee	276	26.90	
Republican	Ron Paul	81	7.89	
Republican	Others/Uncommitted	22	2.14	

Then-Senator Hillary Clinton (D-New York) received more votes than any candidate from either party in DeKalb County during the 2008 presidential primary. Despite initial reports that Clinton had won Missouri, Barack Obama (D-Illinois), also a Senator at the time, narrowly defeated her statewide and later became that year's Democratic nominee, going on to win the presidency.

Missouri Democratic Presidential Primary – DeKalb County (2008)
Party	Candidate	Votes	%	±%
Democratic	Hillary Clinton	596	57.86	
Democratic	Barack Obama	372	36.12	
Democratic	Others/Uncommitted	62	6.02	

== See also ==
- National Register of Historic Places listings in DeKalb County, Missouri
