= Stewartsville, Missouri =

- City
- Coordinates: 39°45′18″N 94°29′55″W
- Country: United States
- State: Missouri
- County: DeKalb

Area
  - Total: 1.00 sq mi (2.58 km^{2})
  - Land: 0.99 sq mi (2.56 km^{2})
  - Water: 0.0077 sq mi (0.02 km^{2})
- Elevation: 997 ft (304 m)

Population (2020)
  - Total: 733
  - Density: 741.8/sq mi (286.42/km^{2})
- Time zone: UTC-6 (Central (CST))
  - Summer (DST): UTC-5 (CDT)
- ZIP code: 64490
- Area code: 816
- FIPS code: 29-70738
- GNIS feature ID: 2395967
- Website: cityofstewartsville.com

Stewartsville is a city in southwest DeKalb County, Missouri, United States. The population was 733 at the 2020 census. The community is named for Robert M. Stewart, a former Missouri governor. It is part of the St. Joseph, MO–KS Metropolitan Statistical Area.

== History ==
Stewartsville was originally called Tethertown, and under the latter name was platted in 1854 by George Tetherow, and named for him. A post office called Stewartsville has been in operation since 1855.

The Dalton-Uphoff House was listed on the National Register of Historic Places in 1982.

== Geography ==
According to the United States Census Bureau, the city has a total area of 1.00 square mile (2.59 km^{2}), of which 0.99 square miles (2.56 km^{2}) is land and 0.01 square miles (0.03 km^{2}) is water.

Stewartsville is located adjacent to U.S. Route 36.

== Demographics ==
Historical population
Census	Pop.	Note	%±
1880	537		—
1890	557		3.7%
1900	616		10.6%
1910	543		−11.9%
1920	534		−1.7%
1930	520		−2.6%
1940	478		−8.1%
1950	414		−13.4%
1960	466		12.6%
1970	634		36.1%
1980	832		31.2%
1990	732		−12.0%
2000	759		3.7%
2010	750		−1.2%
2020	733		−2.3%
U.S. Decennial Census

=== 2010 census ===
As of the census of 2010, there were 750 people, 298 households, and 209 families residing in the city. The population density was 757.6 inhabitants per square mile (292.5/km^{2}). There were 320 housing units at an average density of 323.2 per square mile (124.8/km^{2}). The racial makeup of the city was 96.8% White, 0.5% African American, 0.1% Native American, 0.1% Pacific Islander, 0.8% from other races, and 1.6% from two or more races. Hispanic or Latino of any race were 2.0% of the population.

There were 298 households, of which 30.5% had children under the age of 18 living with them, 51.0% were married couples living together, 12.8% had a female householder with no husband present, 6.4% had a male householder with no wife present, and 29.9% were non-families. 24.2% of all households were made up of individuals, and 10.1% had someone living alone who was 65 years of age or older. The average household size was 2.52 and the average family size was 2.98.

The median age in the city was 40.1 years. 23.1% of residents were under the age of 18; 9.9% were between the ages of 18 and 24; 23.8% were from 25 to 44; 28.2% were from 45 to 64; and 14.8% were 65 years of age or older. The gender makeup of the city was 48.9% male and 51.1% female.

=== 2000 census ===
As of the census of 2000, there were 759 people, 288 households, and 211 families residing in the city. The population density was 779.5 inhabitants per square mile (301.0/km^{2}). There were 308 housing units at an average density of 316.3 per square mile (122.1/km^{2}). The racial makeup of the city was 96.84% White, 1.58% African American, 0.13% Native American, 0.13% Asian, 0.26% from other races, and 1.05% from two or more races. Hispanic or Latino of any race were 1.19% of the population.

There were 288 households, out of which 35.8% had children under the age of 18 living with them, 57.6% were married couples living together, 9.7% had a female householder with no husband present, and 26.7% were non-families. 24.3% of all households were made up of individuals, and 14.2% had someone living alone who was 65 years of age or older. The average household size was 2.64 and the average family size was 3.12.

In the city the population was spread out, with 27.8% under the age of 18, 8.4% from 18 to 24, 29.4% from 25 to 44, 18.7% from 45 to 64, and 15.7% who were 65 years of age or older. The median age was 36 years. For every 100 females, there were 89.3 males. For every 100 females age 18 and over, there were 87.7 males.

The median income for a household in the city was $35,063, and the median income for a family was $40,789. Males had a median income of $31,563 versus $19,917 for females. The per capita income for the city was $14,509. About 7.4% of families and 7.6% of the population were below the poverty line, including 4.6% of those under age 18 and 19.6% of those age 65 or over.

== Education ==
It is in the Stewartsville C-2 School District.

== Gallery ==
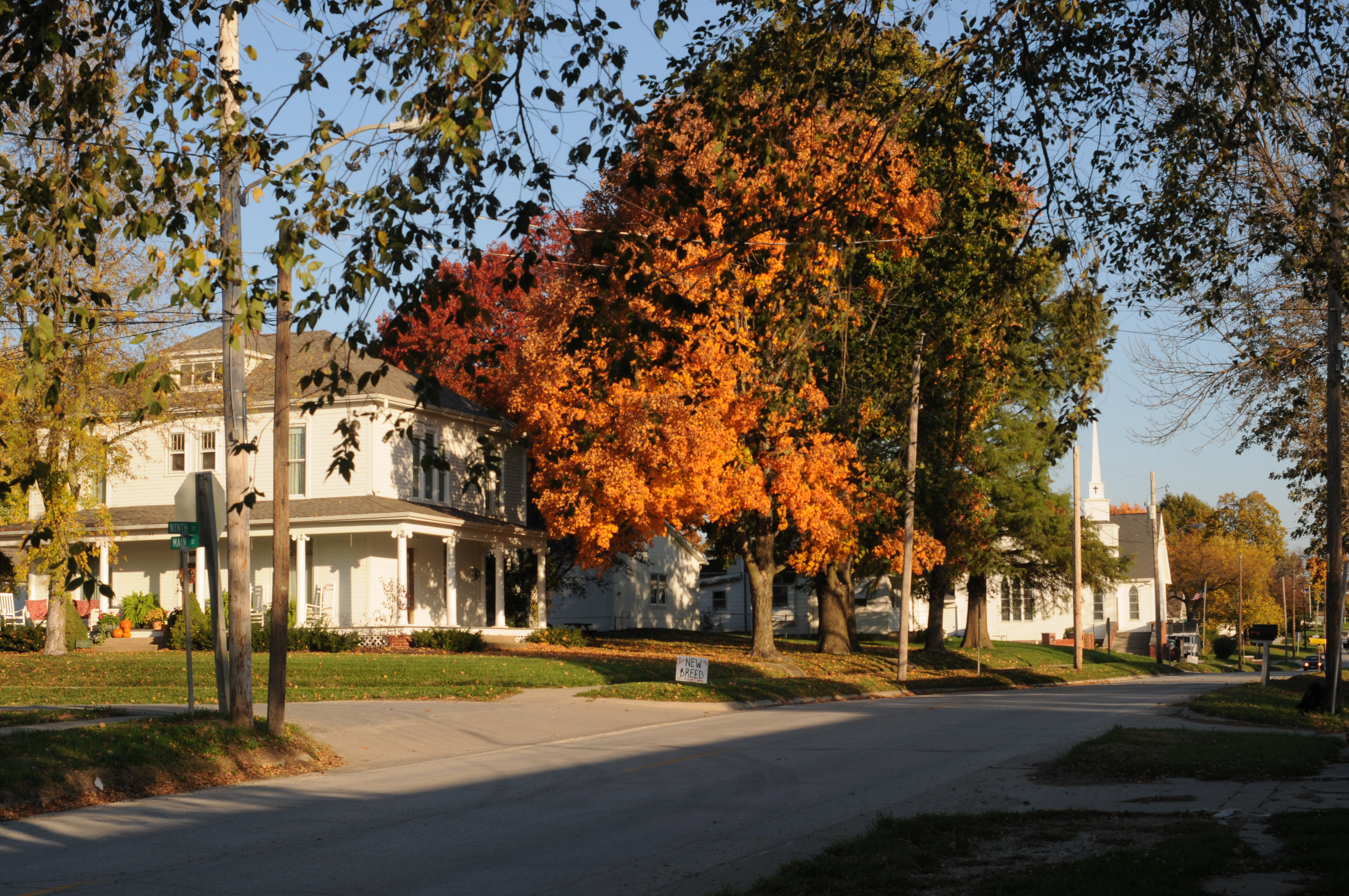
Northward view of Main Street in October 2014

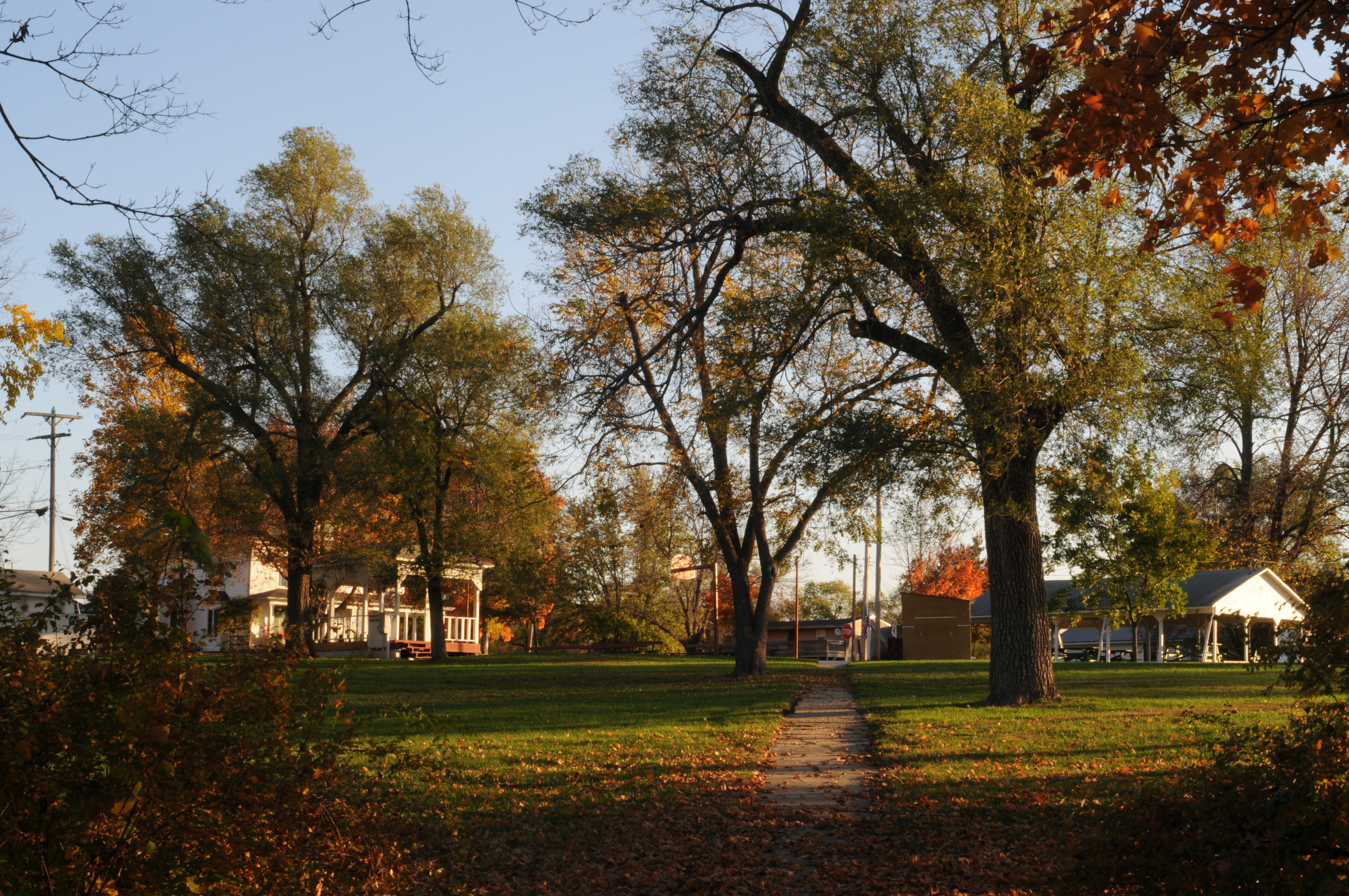
View from the southwest corner of the city park in October 2014
