= Maysville, Missouri =

- City
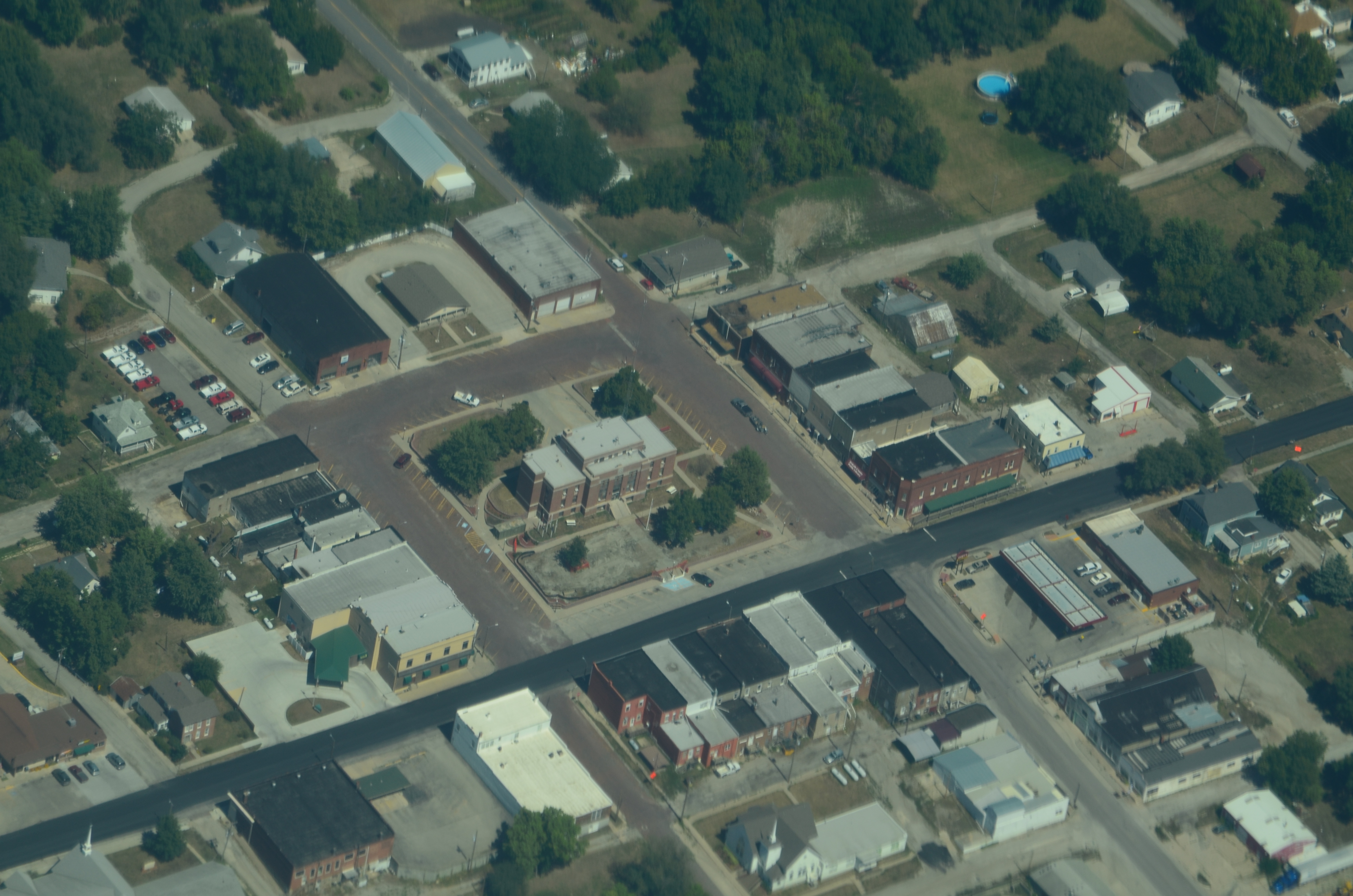
- Aerial view of Maysville, Missouri

- Location of Maysville, Missouri
- Coordinates: 39°53′09″N 94°21′48″W
- Country: United States
- State: Missouri
- County: DeKalb

Area
  - Total: 1.15 sq mi (2.98 km^{2})
  - Land: 1.15 sq mi (2.97 km^{2})
  - Water: 0.0039 sq mi (0.01 km^{2})
- Elevation: 935 ft (285 m)

Population (2020)
  - Total: 1,095
  - Density: 955.8/sq mi (369.04/km^{2})
- Time zone: UTC-6 (Central (CST))
  - Summer (DST): UTC-5 (CDT)
- ZIP code: 64469
- Area codes: 816, 975
- FIPS code: 29-46946
- GNIS feature ID: 2395055
- Website: cityofmaysvillemo.com

Maysville is a city in DeKalb County, Missouri, United States. The population was 1,095 at the 2020 census. Maysville is the county seat of DeKalb County.

Maysville is part of the St. Joseph, Missouri metropolitan area.

== History ==
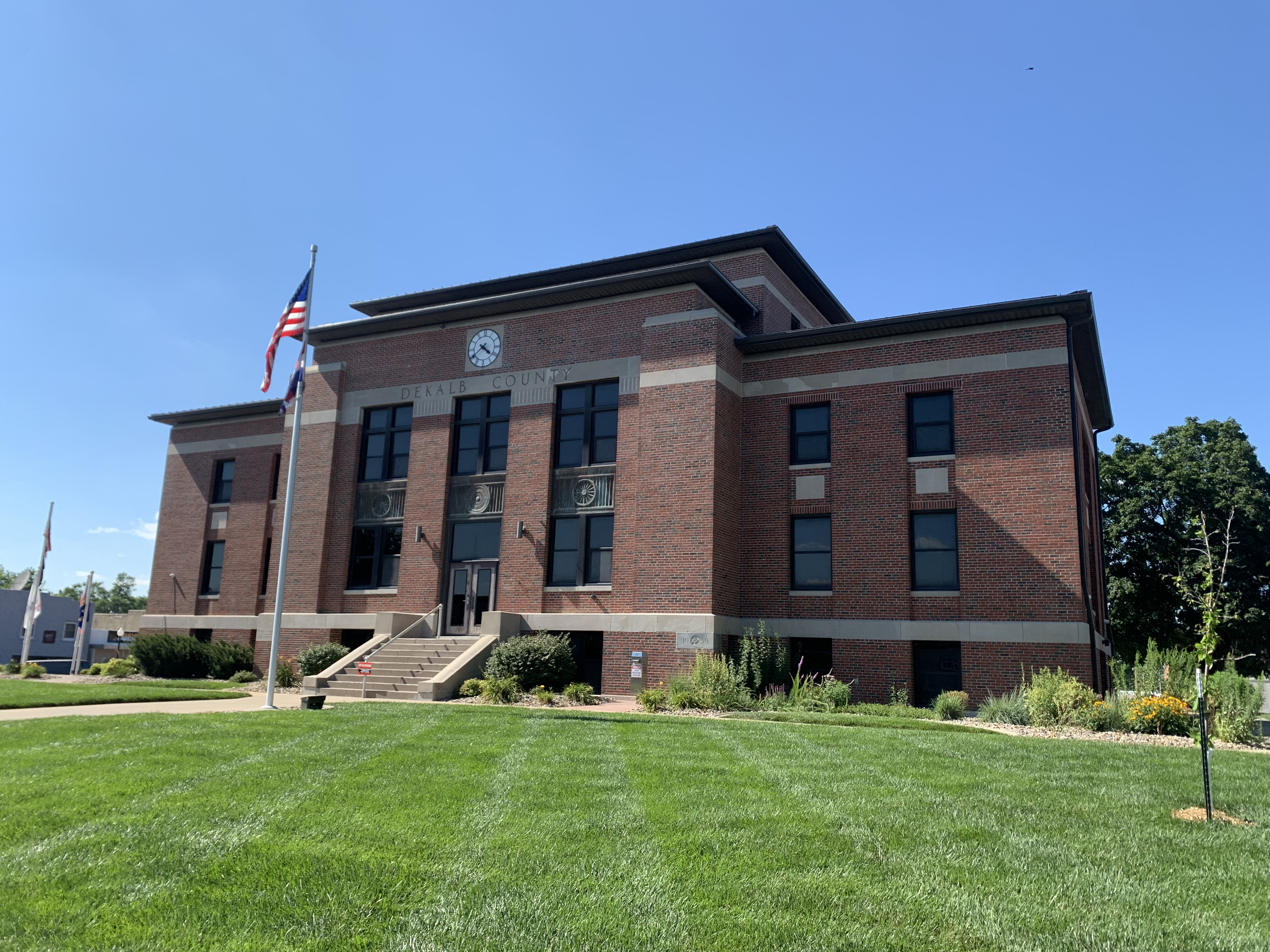
DeKalb County Courthouse in Maysville

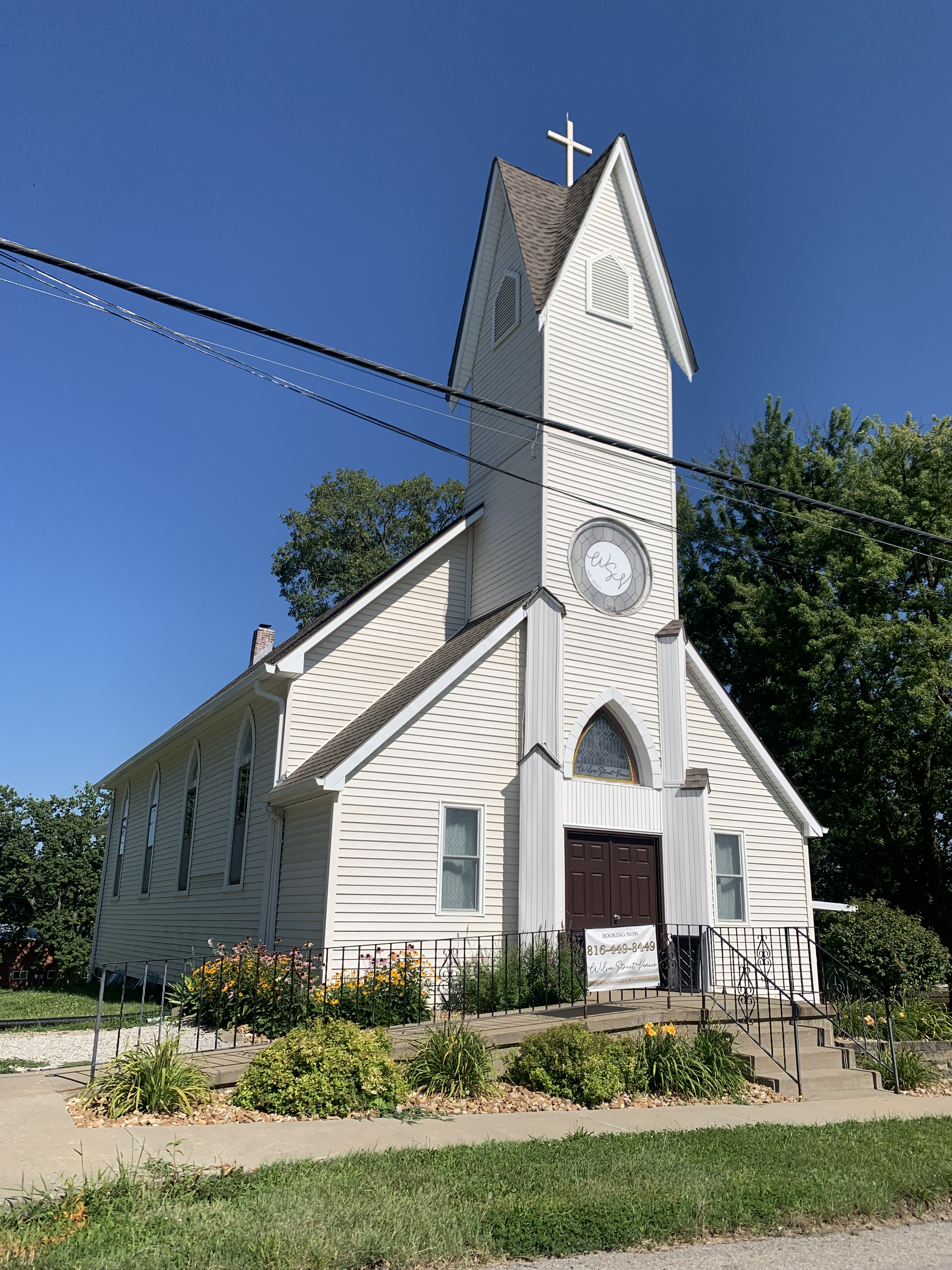
Aloysius Parish Church in Maysville

Maysville was founded in 1845. The name may be a transfer from Maysville, Kentucky. A post office called Maysville has been in operation since 1846.

The DeKalb County Courthouse was listed on the National Register of Historic Places in 1998.

== Geography ==
Maysville is located in central Dekalb County at the intersection of Missouri routes 6 and 33. According to the United States Census Bureau, the city has a total area of 1.16 square miles (3.00 km^{2}), of which 1.15 square miles (2.98 km^{2}) is land and 0.01 square miles (0.03 km^{2}) is water.

=== Climate ===
Climate data for Maysville, Missouri (1991–2020 normals, extremes 1946–2022)
Month	Jan	Feb	Mar	Apr	May	Jun	Jul	Aug	Sep	Oct	Nov	Dec	Year
Record high °F (°C)	69 (21)	77 (25)	85 (29)	92 (33)	98 (37)	101 (38)	111 (44)	105 (41)	105 (41)	94 (34)	82 (28)	73 (23)	111 (44)
Mean maximum °F (°C)	58.7 (14.8)	64.0 (17.8)	76.1 (24.5)	83.5 (28.6)	88.5 (31.4)	93.1 (33.9)	97.2 (36.2)	96.9 (36.1)	91.9 (33.3)	85.0 (29.4)	71.8 (22.1)	62.3 (16.8)	98.7 (37.1)
Mean daily maximum °F (°C)	34.4 (1.3)	39.6 (4.2)	51.8 (11.0)	62.9 (17.2)	72.8 (22.7)	82.3 (27.9)	86.5 (30.3)	85.1 (29.5)	77.7 (25.4)	65.3 (18.5)	51.0 (10.6)	39.0 (3.9)	62.4 (16.9)
Daily mean °F (°C)	24.7 (−4.1)	29.2 (−1.6)	40.5 (4.7)	51.4 (10.8)	61.9 (16.6)	71.8 (22.1)	75.9 (24.4)	74.1 (23.4)	65.9 (18.8)	53.7 (12.1)	40.7 (4.8)	29.7 (−1.3)	51.6 (10.9)
Mean daily minimum °F (°C)	15.1 (−9.4)	18.8 (−7.3)	29.2 (−1.6)	39.8 (4.3)	51.1 (10.6)	61.3 (16.3)	65.3 (18.5)	63.0 (17.2)	54.1 (12.3)	42.1 (5.6)	30.3 (−0.9)	20.5 (−6.4)	40.9 (4.9)
Mean minimum °F (°C)	−4.6 (−20.3)	1.1 (−17.2)	10.7 (−11.8)	25.9 (−3.4)	37.7 (3.2)	50.4 (10.2)	56.6 (13.7)	53.9 (12.2)	40.0 (4.4)	27.7 (−2.4)	14.6 (−9.7)	2.3 (−16.5)	−8.6 (−22.6)
Record low °F (°C)	−24 (−31)	−19 (−28)	−17 (−27)	9 (−13)	27 (−3)	39 (4)	43 (6)	40 (4)	27 (−3)	17 (−8)	−7 (−22)	−32 (−36)	−32 (−36)
Average precipitation inches (mm)	1.05 (27)	1.48 (38)	2.47 (63)	3.89 (99)	5.65 (144)	5.35 (136)	4.64 (118)	4.41 (112)	4.03 (102)	3.28 (83)	2.02 (51)	1.61 (41)	39.88 (1,013)
Average snowfall inches (cm)	5.3 (13)	5.6 (14)	2.0 (5.1)	0.5 (1.3)	0.0 (0.0)	0.0 (0.0)	0.0 (0.0)	0.0 (0.0)	0.0 (0.0)	0.3 (0.76)	1.5 (3.8)	5.5 (14)	20.7 (53)
Average precipitation days (≥ 0.01 in)	4.9	5.3	7.5	10.0	10.9	10.1	8.9	7.8	7.4	7.7	6.2	5.4	92.1
Average snowy days (≥ 0.1 in)	2.9	2.5	1.2	0.4	0.0	0.0	0.0	0.0	0.0	0.2	0.7	2.5	10.4
Source: NOAA

== Demographics ==
Historical population
Census	Pop.	Note	%±
1880	418		—
1890	717		71.5%
1900	925		29.0%
1910	1,051		13.6%
1920	1,057		0.6%
1930	946		−10.5%
1940	1,026		8.5%
1950	973		−5.2%
1960	942		−3.2%
1970	1,045		10.9%
1980	1,187		13.6%
1990	1,176		−0.9%
2000	1,212		3.1%
2010	1,114		−8.1%
2020	1,095		−1.7%
U.S. Decennial Census

=== 2010 census ===
As of the census of 2010, there were 1,114 people, 433 households, and 272 families living in the city. The population density was 968.7 inhabitants per square mile (374.0/km^{2}). There were 496 housing units at an average density of 431.3 per square mile (166.5/km^{2}). The racial makeup of the city was 97.6% White, 0.4% African American, 0.5% Native American, 0.1% Asian, 0.1% Pacific Islander, and 1.3% from two or more races. Hispanic or Latino of any race were 0.4% of the population.

There were 433 households, of which 33.0% had children under the age of 18 living with them, 46.7% were married couples living together, 11.5% had a female householder with no husband present, 4.6% had a male householder with no wife present, and 37.2% were non-families. 32.6% of all households were made up of individuals, and 18.9% had someone living alone who was 65 years of age or older. The average household size was 2.47 and the average family size was 3.15.

The median age in the city was 39.3 years. 26.5% of residents were under the age of 18; 7.7% were between the ages of 18 and 24; 22.9% were from 25 to 44; 24.1% were from 45 to 64; and 18.9% were 65 years of age or older. The gender makeup of the city was 45.7% male and 54.3% female.

=== 2000 census ===
As of the census of 2000, there were 1,212 people, 457 households, and 302 families living in the city. The population density was 1,065.9 inhabitants per square mile (411.5/km^{2}). There were 491 housing units at an average density of 431.8 per square mile (166.7/km^{2}). The racial makeup of the city was 98.76% White, 0.08% African American, 0.33% Native American, 0.17% Asian, 0.33% from other races, and 0.33% from two or more races. Hispanic or Latino of any race were 0.50% of the population.

There were 457 households, out of which 34.4% had children under the age of 18 living with them, 52.7% were married couples living together, 10.1% had a female householder with no husband present, and 33.7% were non-families. 30.9% of all households were made up of individuals, and 18.8% had someone living alone who was 65 years of age or older. The average household size was 2.49 and the average family size was 3.14.

In the city, the population was spread out, with 28.5% under the age of 18, 6.5% from 18 to 24, 25.7% from 25 to 44, 17.1% from 45 to 64, and 22.1% who were 65 years of age or older. The median age was 38 years. For every 100 females, there were 85.3 males. For every 100 females age 18 and over, there were 81.9 males.

The median income for a household in the city was $27,727, and the median income for a family was $36,979. Males had a median income of $28,382 versus $18,646 for females. The per capita income for the city was $11,871. About 12.4% of families and 16.6% of the population were below the poverty line, including 20.4% of those under age 18 and 17.6% of those age 65 or over.

== Education ==
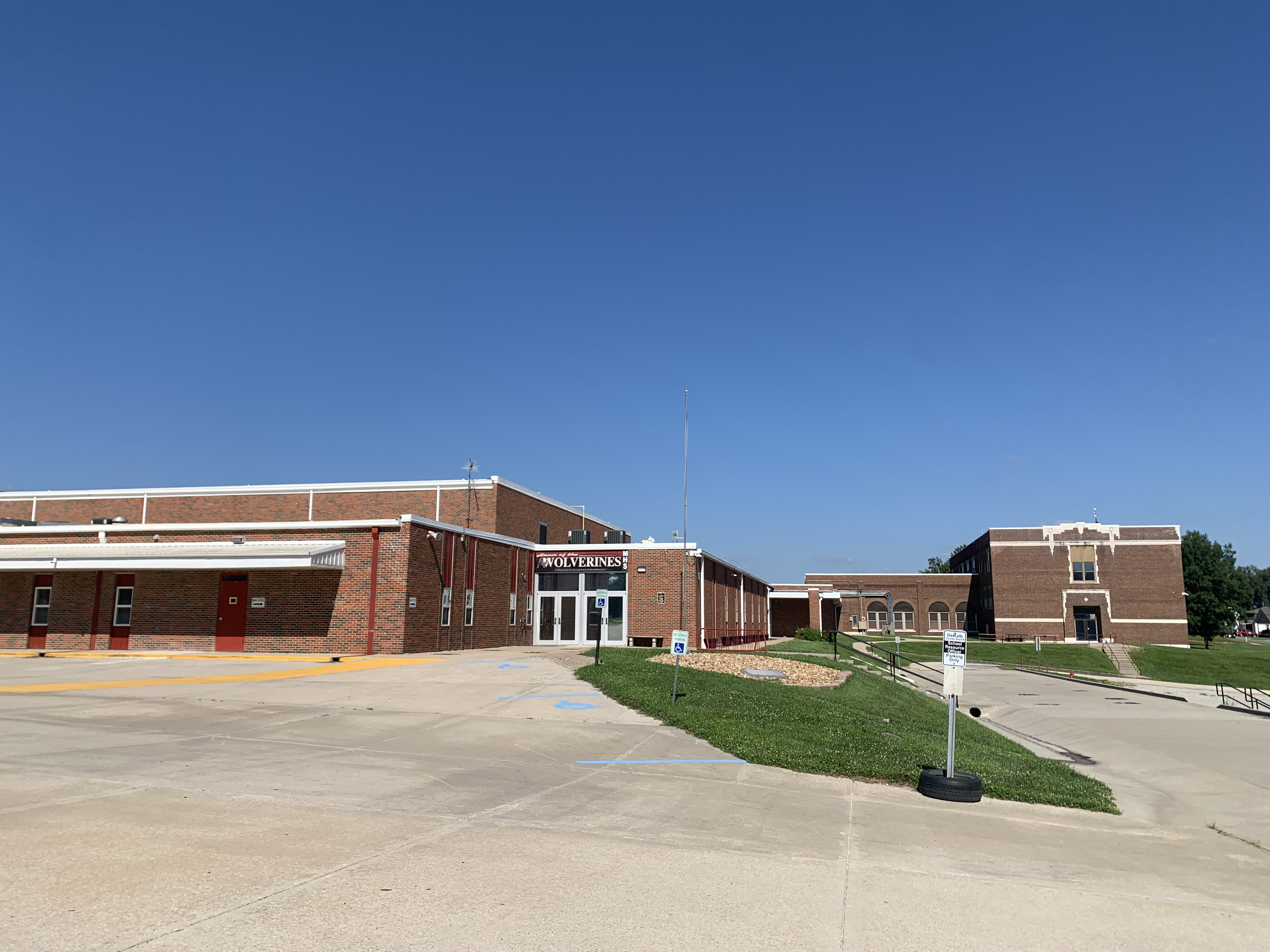
Maysville School

It is in the Maysville R-I School District. Students in Maysville attend R-1 Elementary and Maysville R-1 Jr./Sr. High School.
