= Jefferson Township, Andrew County, Missouri =

Township in Andrew County, Missouri, U.S.

Jefferson Township
- Township
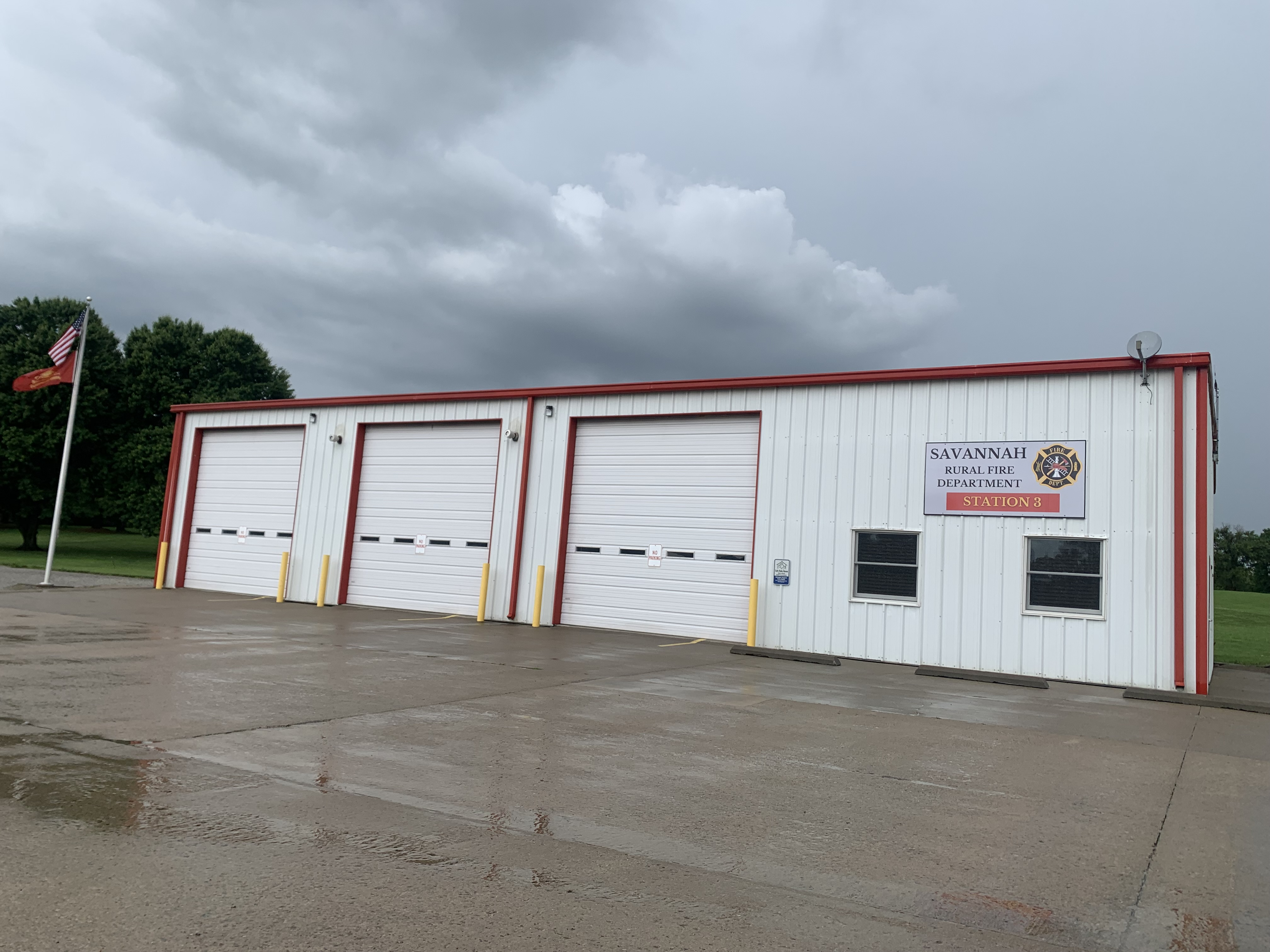
- Fire Station 3 in southern Jefferson Township

- Coordinates: 39°51′35″N 94°49′11″W
- Country: United States
- State: Missouri
- County: Andrew

Area
  - Total: 32.6 sq mi (84 km^{2})
  - Land: 32.3 sq mi (84 km^{2})
  - Water: 0.3 sq mi (0.78 km^{2}) 0.92%
- Elevation: 981 ft (299 m)

Population (2020)
  - Total: 5,367
  - Density: 166.1/sq mi (64.1/km^{2})
- FIPS code: 29-00336710
- GNIS feature ID: 766224

Jefferson Township is a township in Andrew County, Missouri, United States. At the 2020 census, its population was 5367.

Jefferson Township was established in 1846, and named after Thomas Jefferson.

== Geography ==
Jefferson Township covers an area of 32.81 square miles (85.0 km^{2}) and contains one incorporated settlement, Country Club. It shares part of its southern border with the city of St. Joseph in neighboring Buchanan County. The township contains five cemeteries: Fairview, Green, Ladd, Todd and Vanschoiack.

The streams of Crowley Creek, Dillon Creek, and Mace Creek run through this township.

== Transportation ==
The following highways travel through the township:

- Interstate 29
- Interstate 229
- U.S. Route 59
- U.S. Route 169
- Route DD
- Route K

== Jimtown ==
Jimtown was a hamlet in Andrew County founded in 1839. The GNIS classifies it as a populated place, but the exact location of the town site is unknown. Its post office was established in 184 under the name Jamestown. Its church was mapped under that name as well, but the village was known informally as "Jimtown." The church, the oldest in northwest Missouri, was noted for its use before Emancipation by Baptist and Methodist ministers to "convert" enslaved people to religious precepts, supposedly guaranteeing their reliability when they were hired out. The village was on the Missouri Valley railway line from St. Joseph to Savannah and was one of several competing trading posts in the area. It had a railway station, a hotel, a tavern, two stores, a school, and a blacksmith's forge, as well as the church. However, in 1871 the Burlington Railway built a cutoff to Amazonia that bypassed Jimtown and its rail line fell out of use. Its cemetery, also known as the Todd cemetery, is located at 39°50′03″N 94°50′34″W.
