= Benton Township, Andrew County, Missouri =

Township in Andrew County, Missouri, U.S.

Benton Township
- Township
- Coordinates: 40°03′54″N 94°49′51″W
- Country: United States
- State: Missouri
- County: Andrew

Area
  - Total: 49.97 sq mi (129.4 km^{2})
  - Land: 49.61 sq mi (128.5 km^{2})
  - Water: 0.36 sq mi (0.93 km^{2}) 0.72%
- Elevation: 912 ft (278 m)

Population (2020)
  - Total: 992
  - Density: 20/sq mi (7.7/km^{2})
- FIPS code: 29-00304564
- GNIS feature ID: 766220

Benton Township is a township in Andrew County, Missouri, United States. At the 2020 census, its population was 992.

The township was named after Thomas Hart Benton, a senator from Missouri.

== Geography ==
Benton Township covers an area of 50.0 square miles (129.4 km^{2}) and contains two incorporated settlements, Bolckow and Rosendale, and one unincorporated one, Wyeth.

The One Hundred and Two River and the streams of Kellog Branch, Lower Neely Branch, Riggin Branch, Upper Neely Branch, and White Cloud Creek run through this township.

== Transportation ==
Benton Township contains one airport, Furst Landing Strip.

The following highways travel through the township:

- U.S. Route 71
- Route 48
- Route A
- Route B
- Route C
- Route N
- Route Y
