= Fountainbleau, Missouri =

Extinct hamlet in Missouri, U.S.

Coordinates: 39°58′27″N 94°42′26″W

Fountainbleau is an extinct hamlet in Andrew County, in the U.S. state of Missouri. The Fountainbleau school was located approximately 2.5 miles northeast of Kodiak on Missouri Route D.

== History ==
A post office called Fountainbleau was established in 1875, and remained in operation until 1905. The community was named after the Palace of Fontainebleau, in France.
