= Bolckow =

Bolckow may refer to:

- Henry Bolckow (1806–1878), Victorian industrialist and politician
  - Bolckow, Vaughan, an English ironmaking and mining company
- Bolckow, Missouri, a city in the United States
