= Rankin, Missouri =

Unincorporated community in Missouri, U.S.

Coordinates: 40°04′02″N 94°55′04″W

Rankin is an unincorporated community in Andrew County, in the U.S. state of Missouri.

== History ==
Rankin was a small community, located just north of Fillmore during the late nineteenth and early twentieth centuries. A post office in Rankin was in operation from 1894 to 1908. The community was named after John Rankin, the original owner of the town site. A cemetery is the only marker of the past community that remains today, which includes multiple tombstones with the family name Rankin on them.
