= Rochester, Missouri =

Unincorporated community in Missouri, U.S.

Coordinates: 39°54′44″N 94°41′05″W

Rochester, Missouri on U.S. Highway 169

Rochester is an unincorporated community in Andrew County, in the U.S. state of Missouri. The community is part of the St. Joseph, MO–KS Metropolitan Statistical Area.

== History ==
Rochester was platted in 1848. The name is a transfer from Rochester, England. A post office called Rochester was established in 1844, and remained in operation until 1935. One notable feature was its extensive cheese factory.

== Geography ==
Rochester was located just east of the Platte River.
