= Rochester Township, Andrew County, Missouri =

Township in Andrew County, Missouri, U.S.

Rochester Township
- Township
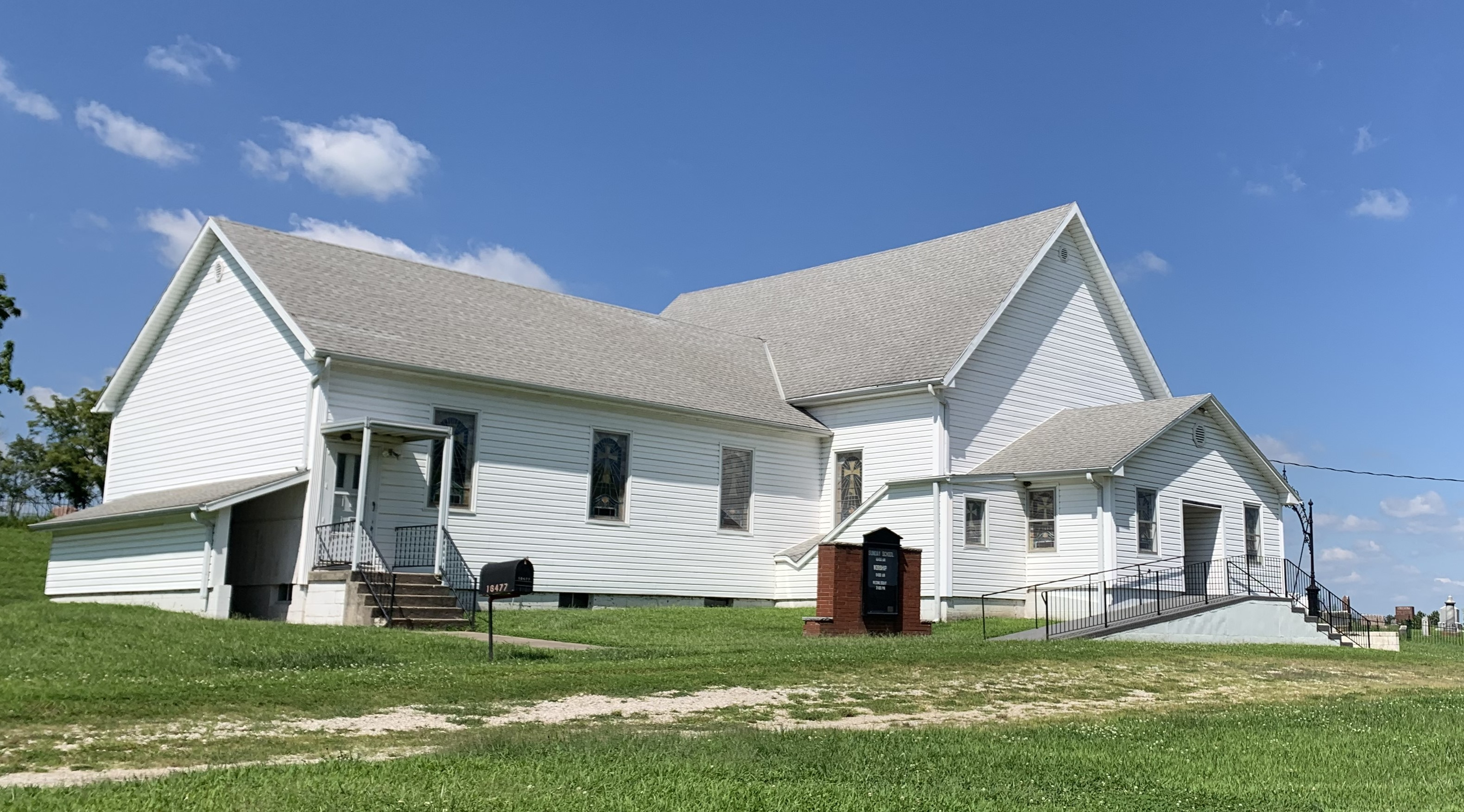
- Long Branch Baptist Church in Rochester Township

- Coordinates: 39°55′46″N 94°41′51″W
- Country: United States
- State: Missouri
- County: Andrew

Area
  - Total: 55.97 sq mi (145.0 km^{2})
  - Land: 55.4 sq mi (143 km^{2})
  - Water: 0.57 sq mi (1.5 km^{2}) 1.02%
- Elevation: 879 ft (268 m)

Population (2020)
  - Total: 1,214
  - Density: 21.9/sq mi (8.5/km^{2})
- FIPS code: 29-00362534
- GNIS feature ID: 766229

Rochester Township is a township in Andrew County, Missouri, United States. At the 2020 census, its population was 1214.

== Geography ==
Rochester Township covers an area of 56.0 square miles (145.0 km^{2}) and contains no incorporated settlements.

The stream of Niagara Creek runs through this township.

== Transportation ==
The following highways travel through the township:

- U.S. Route 169
- Route D
- Route E
- Route F
- Route UU
- Route V
- Route Z
