= Nodaway Township, Andrew County, Missouri =

Township in Andrew County, Missouri, U.S.

Nodaway Township
- Township
- Coordinates: 39°57′59″N 94°49′21″W
- Country: United States
- State: Missouri
- County: Andrew

Area
  - Total: 39.41 sq mi (102.1 km^{2})
  - Land: 39.01 sq mi (101.0 km^{2})
  - Water: 0.4 sq mi (1.0 km^{2}) 1.01%
- Elevation: 1,024 ft (312 m)

Population (2020)
  - Total: 6,901
  - Density: 176.9/sq mi (68.3/km^{2})
- FIPS code: 29-00352688
- GNIS feature ID: 766227

Nodaway Township is a township in Andrew County, Missouri, United States. At the 2020 census, its population was 6901.

Nodaway Township was established in 1846, and named after the Nodaway River.

== Geography ==
Nodaway Township covers an area of 39.4 square miles (102.1 km^{2}) and contains one incorporated settlement, Savannah (the county seat). It contains four cemeteries: Bennett Lane, Coffman, Earls and Kellogg.

The streams of Honey Creek and Lincoln Creek run through this township.

== Transportation ==
Nodaway Township contains one airport, Worth Airport.

The following highways travel through the township:

- U.S. Route 59
- U.S. Route 71
- Route C
- Route DD
- Route E
- Route T
