= Jackson Township, Andrew County, Missouri =

Township in Andrew County, Missouri, U.S.

Jackson Township
- Township
- Coordinates: 40°00′55″N 94°55′59″W
- Country: United States
- State: Missouri
- County: Andrew

Area
  - Total: 34.7 sq mi (90 km^{2})
  - Land: 34.65 sq mi (89.7 km^{2})
  - Water: 0.05 sq mi (0.13 km^{2}) 0.14%
- Elevation: 1,001 ft (305 m)

Population (2020)
  - Total: 626
  - Density: 18.1/sq mi (7.0/km^{2})
- FIPS code: 29-00335576
- GNIS feature ID: 766223

Jackson Township is a township in Andrew County, Missouri, United States. At the 2020 census, its population was 626.

Jackson Township was organized in 1846, and named after an early settler.

== Geography ==
Jackson Township covers an area of 34.7 square miles (89.9 km^{2}) and contains one incorporated settlement, Fillmore. It contains three cemeteries: Clizer, Gillispie and Jackson.

== Transportation ==
Jackson Township contains one airport, Cole Landing Strip.

The following highways travel through the township:

- Interstate 29
- U.S. Route 59
- U.S. Route 71
- Route A
- Route CC
- Route H
- Route RA
