= Kodiak, Missouri =

Unincorporated community in Missouri, U.S.

Coordinates: 39°57′07″N 94°45′26″W

Kodiak is an extinct hamlet in Andrew County, in the U.S. state of Missouri. The community was located on Missouri Route D and is approximately one mile east of Savannah. The Happy Holler Lake Conservation Area lies just northwest of the community.

== History ==
A post office called Kodiak was established in 1892, and remained in operation until 1904. The community was named by postal officials. Nothing remains of the settlement today.
