= Helena, Missouri =

Unincorporated community in Andrew County, Missouri, United States

Coordinates: 39°54′46″N 94°38′58″W

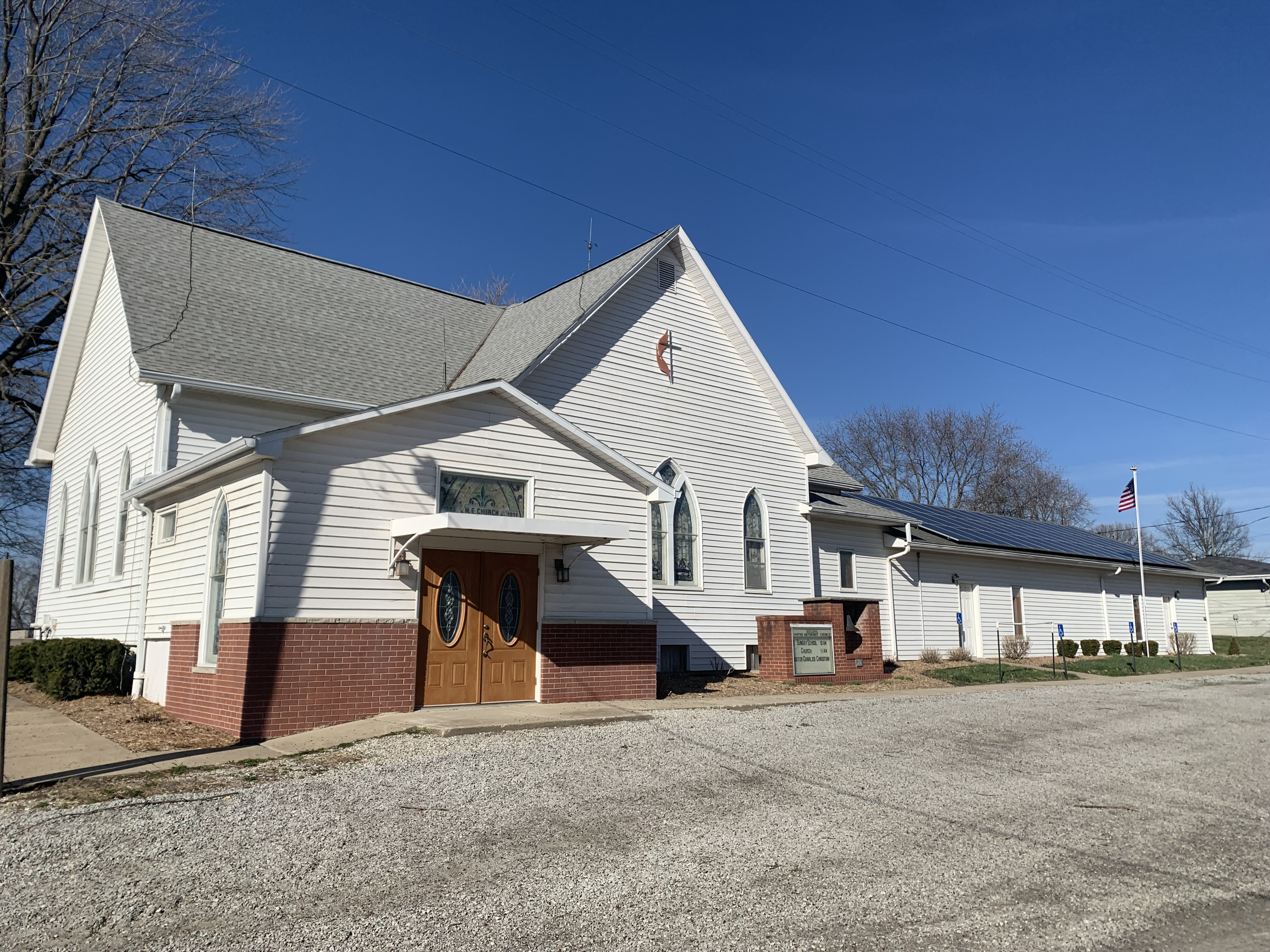
Helena United Methodist Church, March 2025

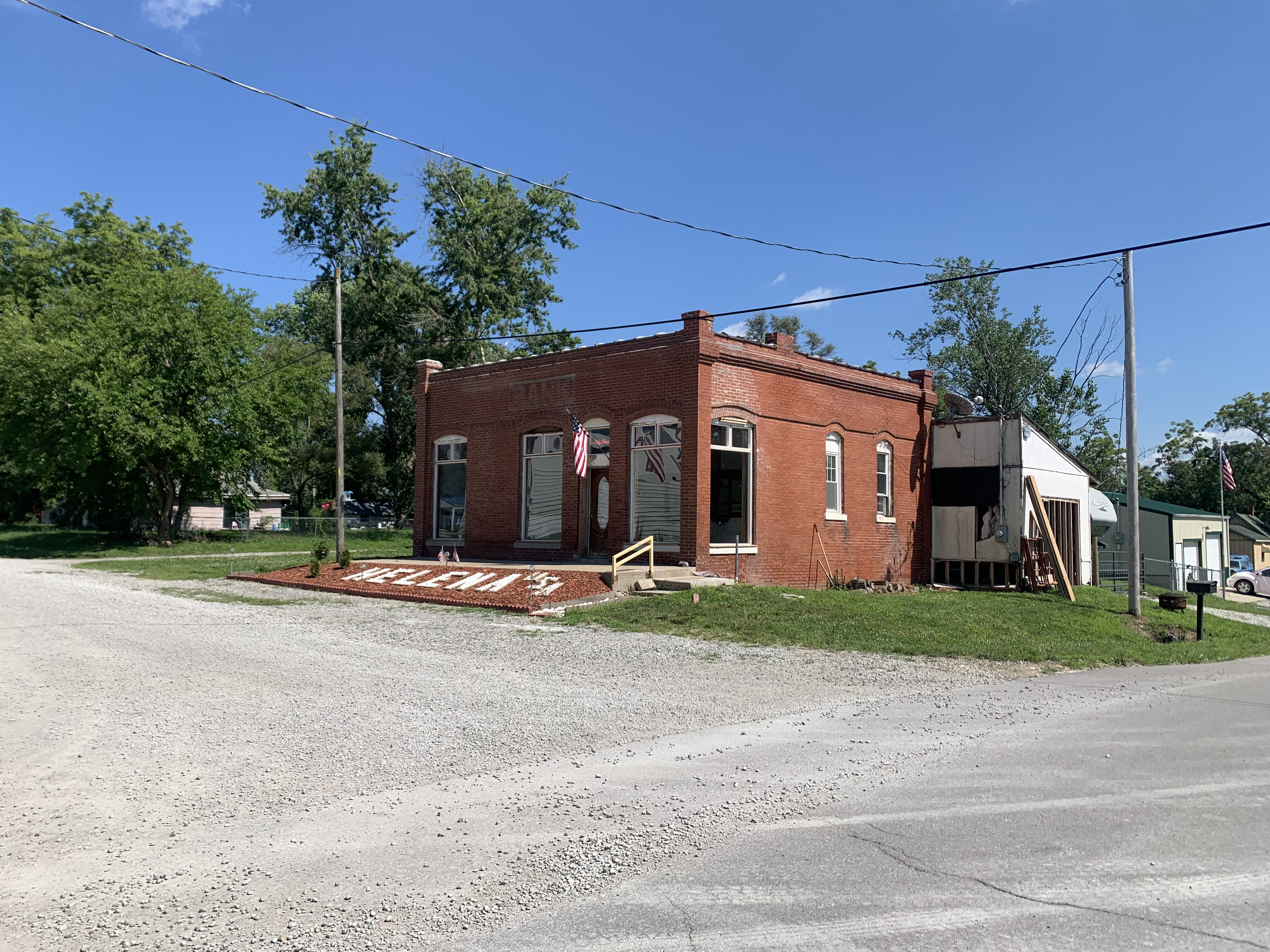
Defunct bank in Helena

Helena (/həˈliːnə/ hə-LEE-nə) is an unincorporated community in southeastern Andrew County, Missouri, United States. It is located approximately 12 miles (19 km) northeast of St. Joseph and is part of the St. Joseph, MO–KS Metropolitan Statistical Area.

Helena has a park, an elementary school, two churches, a community center and a post office.

== History ==
Helena was laid out in 1878. According to tradition, the community has the name of the daughter of a railroad man. A post office called Helena has been in operation since 1880.
