= Wyeth, Missouri =

Unincorporated community in Andrew County, Missouri, United States

Coordinates: 40°01′30″N 94°48′08″W

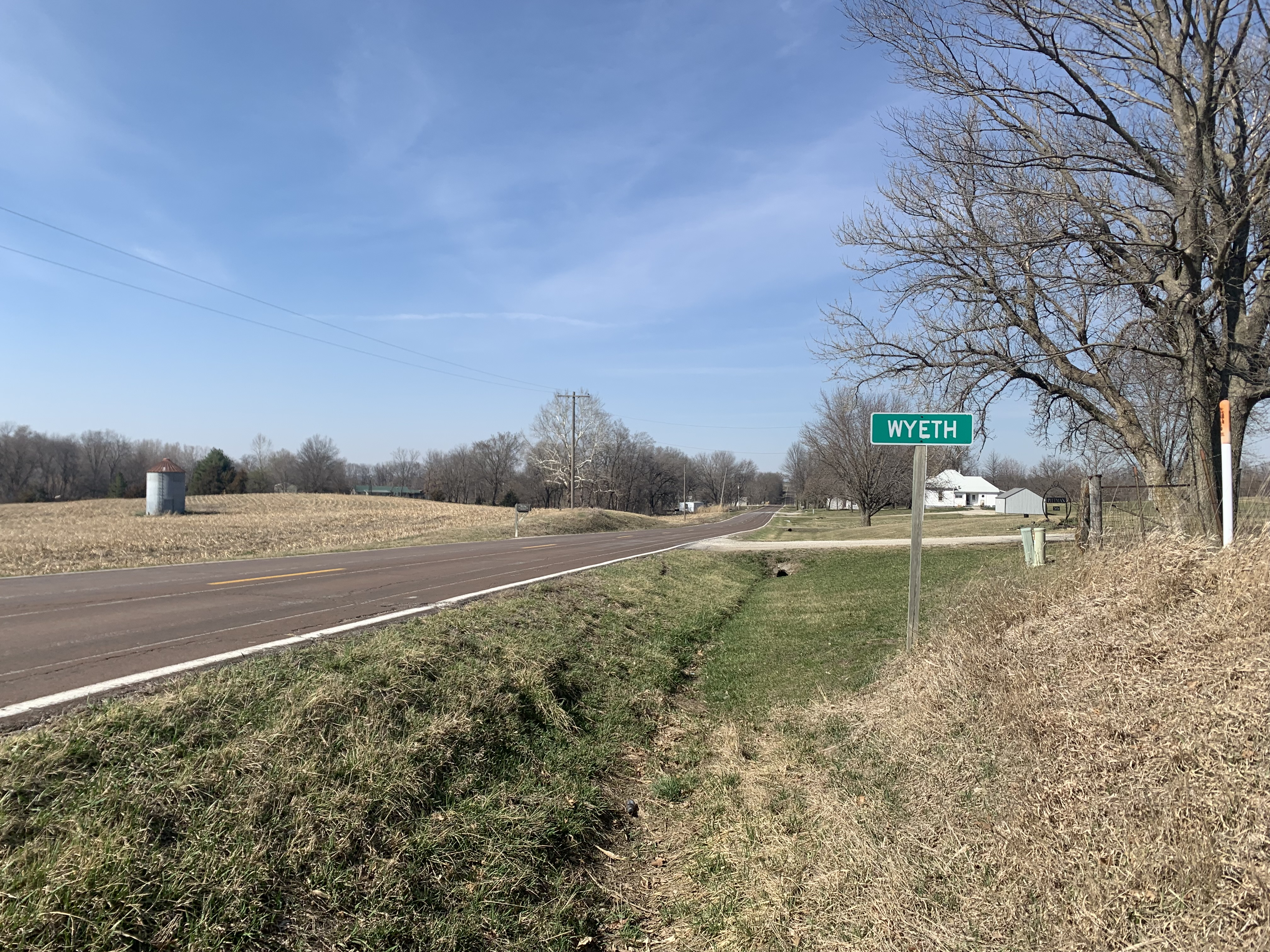
North on Route C in Wyeth, March 2025.

Wyeth is an unincorporated community in Andrew County, Missouri, United States.

== Description ==
The community is on Route C approximately 1.5 miles (2.4 km) southeast of Rosendale. The One Hundred and Two River flows past about 1/2 of a mile (0.80 km) to the west.

== History ==
An old variant name was Rush, after Peter Rush, a local landowner. A post office called Rush was established in 1890, the name was changed into Wyeth in 1904, and the post office closed in 1905.
