= Avenue City, Missouri =

Unincorporated community in Andrew County, Missouri, United States

Coordinates: 39°51′48″N 94°45′26″W

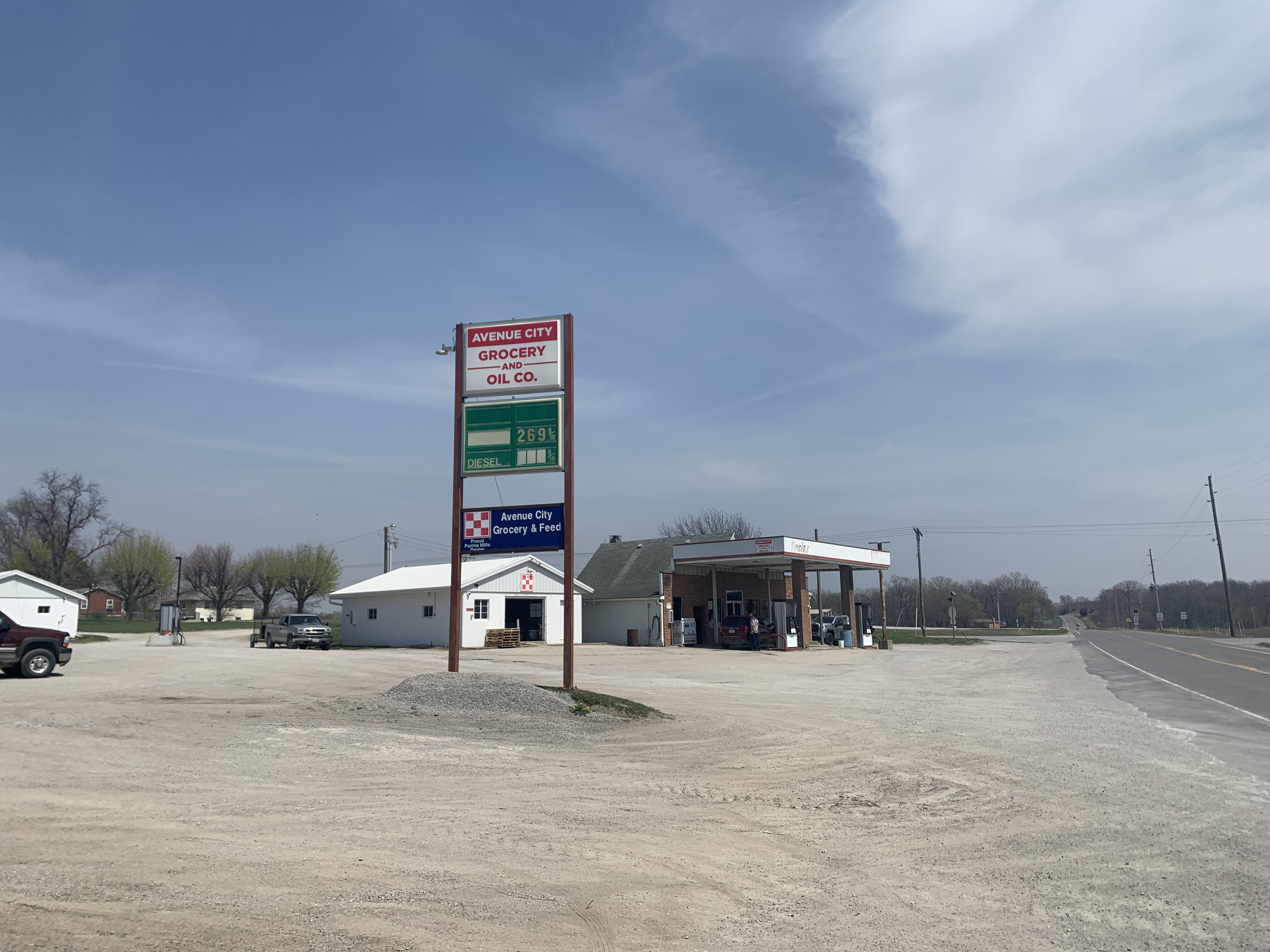
Avenue City Gas Station along U.S. Route 169, April 2025

Avenue City is an unincorporated community in Andrew County, Missouri, United States.

== History ==
A post office called Avenue City was established in 1878, and remained in operation until 1913. The community takes its name from Frederick Avenue in St. Joseph, Missouri. Originally located just west of the 102 River, Avenue included a telephone exchange and a few stores. Avenue City later became associated with two stores located east of the One Hundred and Two River. Currently only one store remains, which includes a gas station and small grocery store.
