= Dillon Creek =

Stream in Andrew County, Missouri, U.S.

Coordinates: 39°51′26″N 94°52′51″W

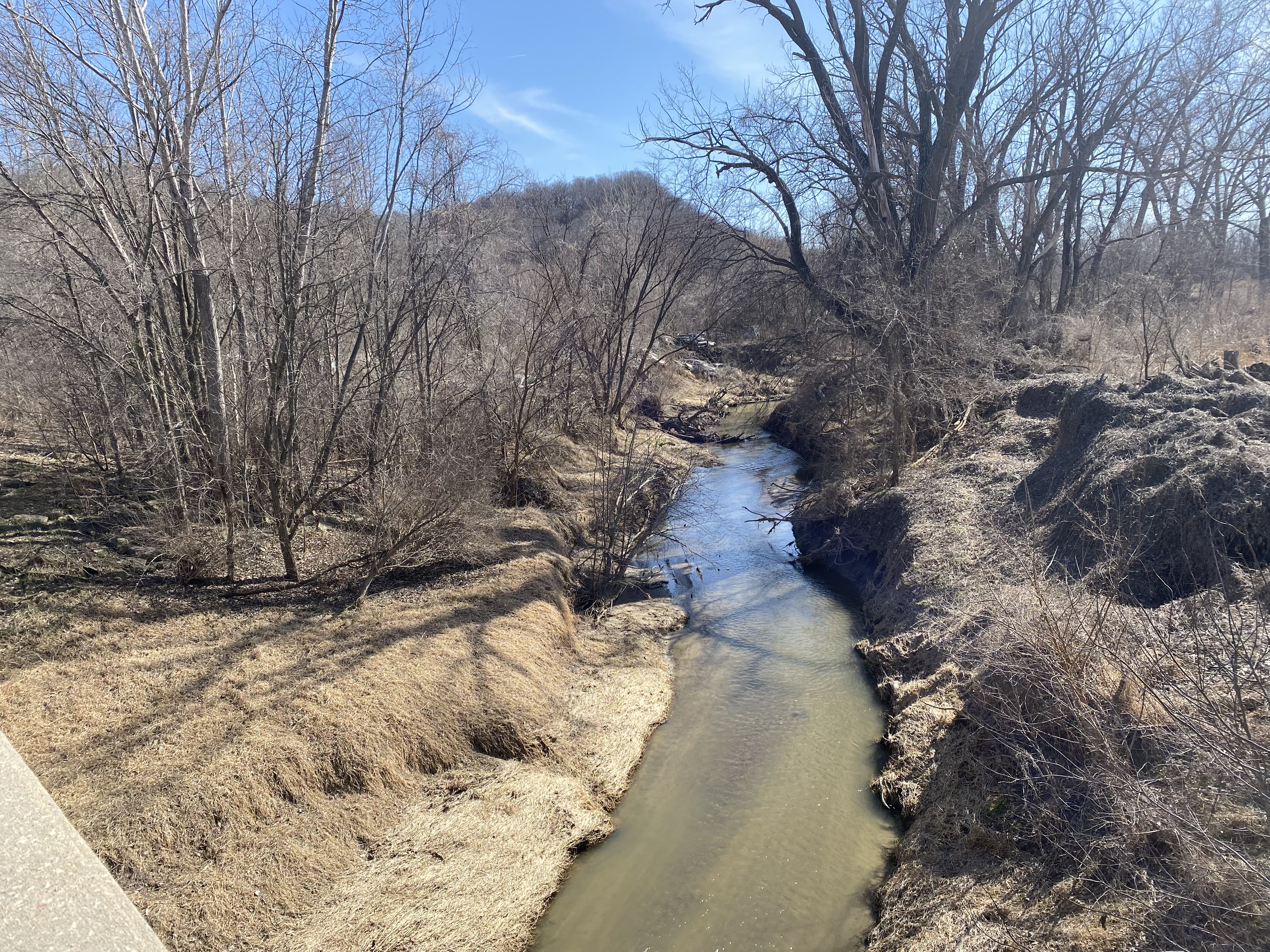
Dillon Creek on Route K bridge in Andrew County

Dillon Creek is a stream in Andrew County in the U.S. state of Missouri.

Dillon Creek was named after Abraham Dillon, the proprietor of a local sawmill. An alternate name was Dillons Creek.

== See also ==
- List of rivers of Missouri
