= Empire Prairie, Missouri =

Extinct hamlet in Missouri, U.S.

Coordinates: 40°04′59″N 94°38′21″W

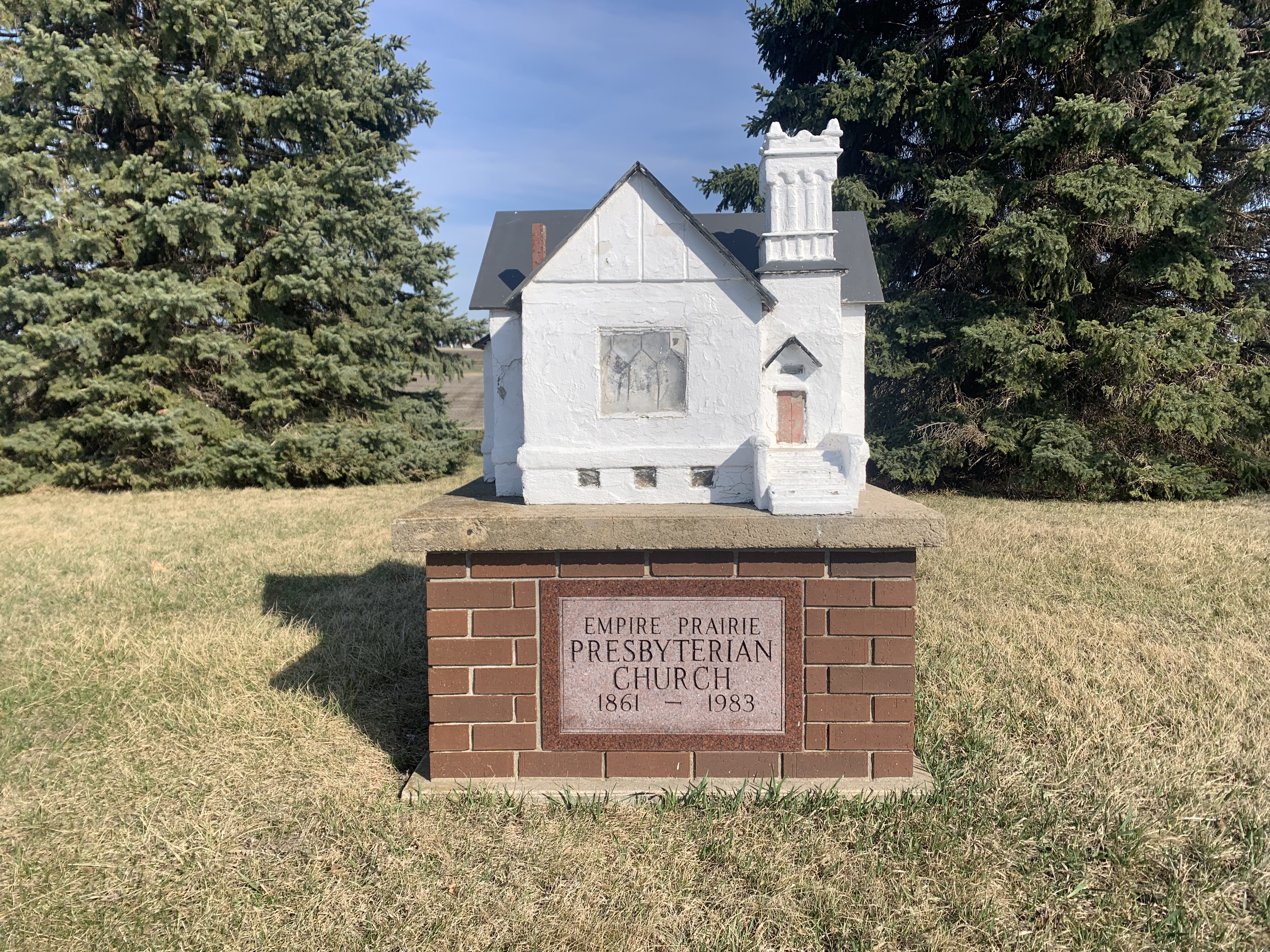

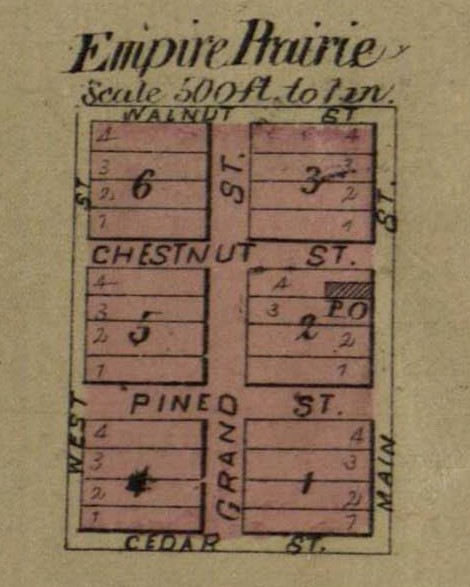
Plat of Empire Prairie depicted in an 1877 map

Empire Prairie is an extinct hamlet in Andrew County, in the U.S. state of Missouri. The GNIS classifies it as a populated place.

A post office called Empire Prairie was established in 1859, and remained in operation until 1905. The community took its name from a local farm also called Empire Prairie owned by settler David Bonham. An alternate name was Empire City and with this name it was founded in 1869.
