= Monroe Township, Andrew County, Missouri =

Township in Andrew County, Missouri, U.S.

Monroe Township
- Township
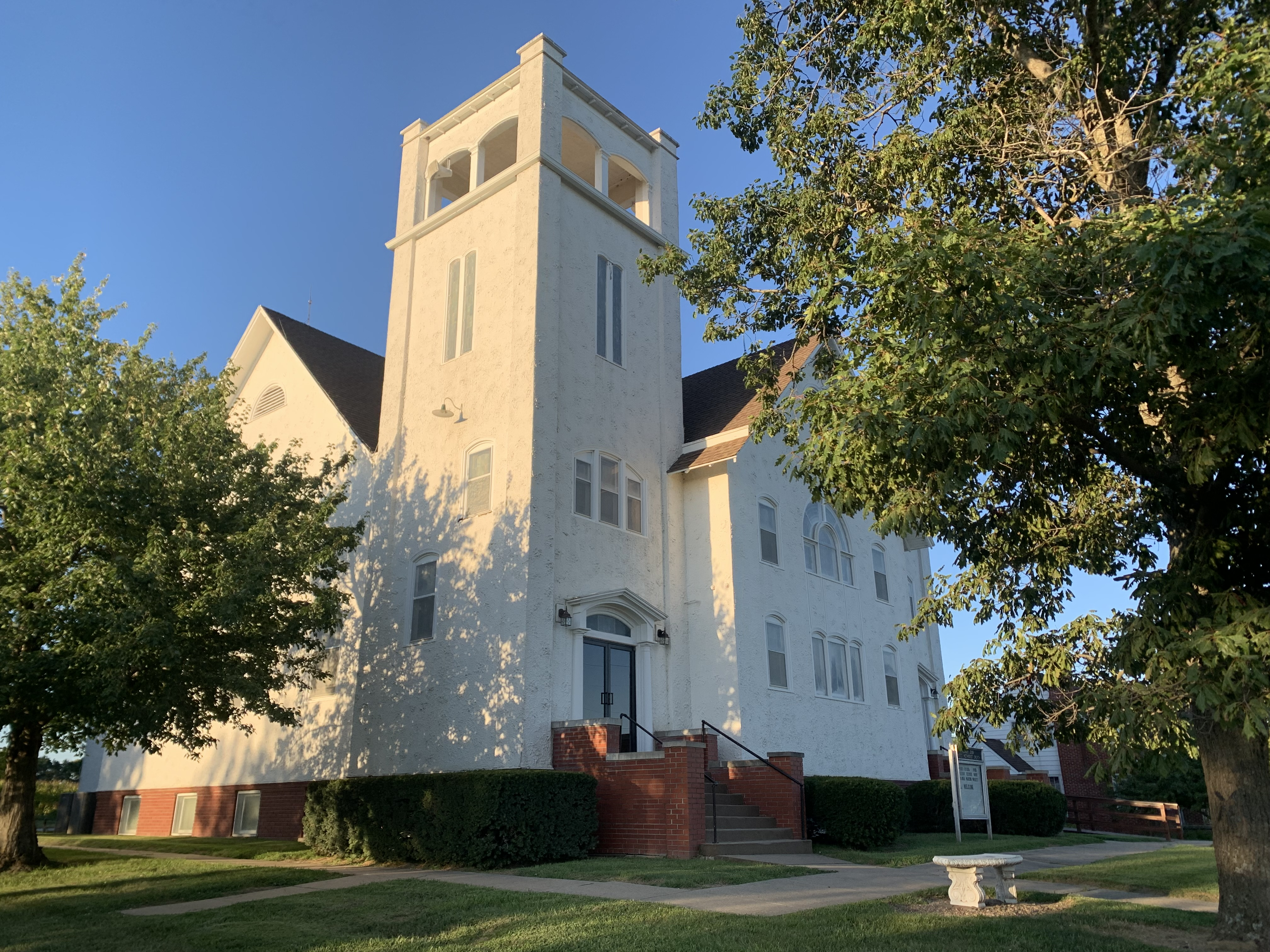
- Cosby Zion Methodist Church

- Coordinates: 39°50′48″N 94°40′31″W
- Country: United States
- State: Missouri
- County: Andrew

Area
  - Total: 34.16 sq mi (88.5 km^{2})
  - Land: 33.63 sq mi (87.1 km^{2})
  - Water: 0.53 sq mi (1.4 km^{2}) 1.55%
- Elevation: 909 ft (277 m)

Population (2020)
  - Total: 845
  - Density: 25.1/sq mi (9.7/km^{2})
- FIPS code: 29-00349286
- GNIS feature ID: 766226

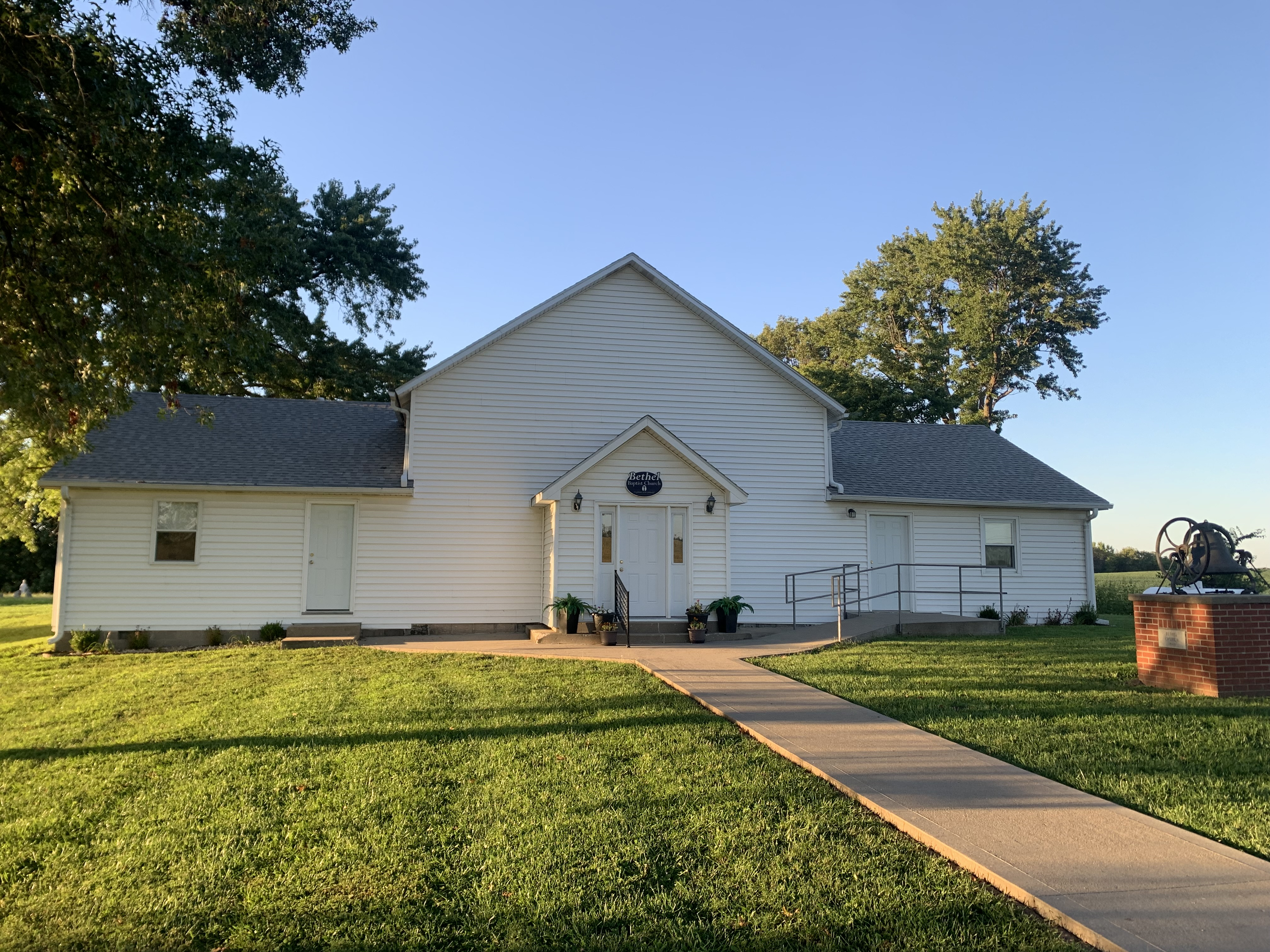
Bethel Baptist Church in Monroe Township, Andrew County, Missouri

Monroe Township is a township in Andrew County, Missouri, United States. At the 2020 census, its population was 845.

The township was named after President James Monroe.

== Geography ==
Monroe Township covers an area of 34.2 square miles (88.6 km^{2}) and contains one incorporated settlement, Cosby. It contains five cemeteries: Bethel, Brown, Concord, High Prairie and Oak Ridge.

The stream of Long Branch runs through this township.

== Transportation ==
The following highways travel through the township:

- U.S. Route 169
- Route D
- Route O
- Route UU
- Route W
- Route Z
