= Country Club, Missouri =

Village in Andrew County, Missouri, United States

- Village
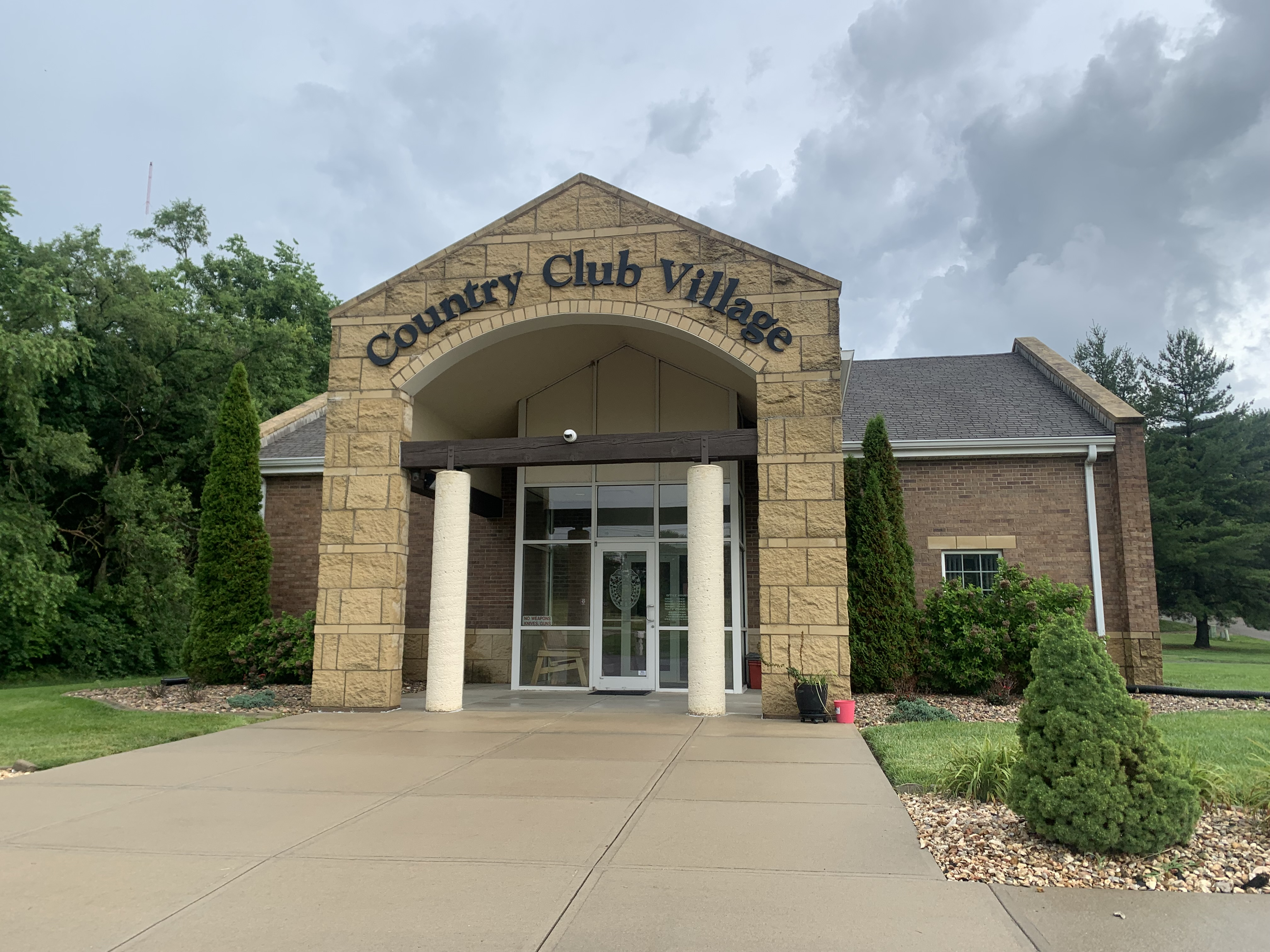
- Country Club Village City Hall, June 2026

- Logo

- Location of Country Club Village, Missouri
- Coordinates: 39°50′20″N 94°49′14″W
- Country: United States
- State: Missouri
- County: Andrew
- Township: Jefferson
- Incorporated: 1954

Area
  - Total: 3.93 sq mi (10.19 km^{2})
  - Land: 3.91 sq mi (10.12 km^{2})
  - Water: 0.027 sq mi (0.07 km^{2})
- Elevation: 1,037 ft (316 m)

Population (2020)
  - Total: 2,487
  - Density: 636.7/sq mi (245.84/km^{2})
- Time zone: UTC-6 (Central (CST))
  - Summer (DST): UTC-5 (CDT)
- FIPS code: 29-16802
- GNIS feature ID: 2398636
- Website: www.villageofcountryclubmo.gov

Country Club is a village in Jefferson Township, Andrew County, Missouri, United States. The population was 2,487 at the 2020 census. It is part of the St. Joseph, MO–KS Metropolitan Statistical Area.

== Geography ==
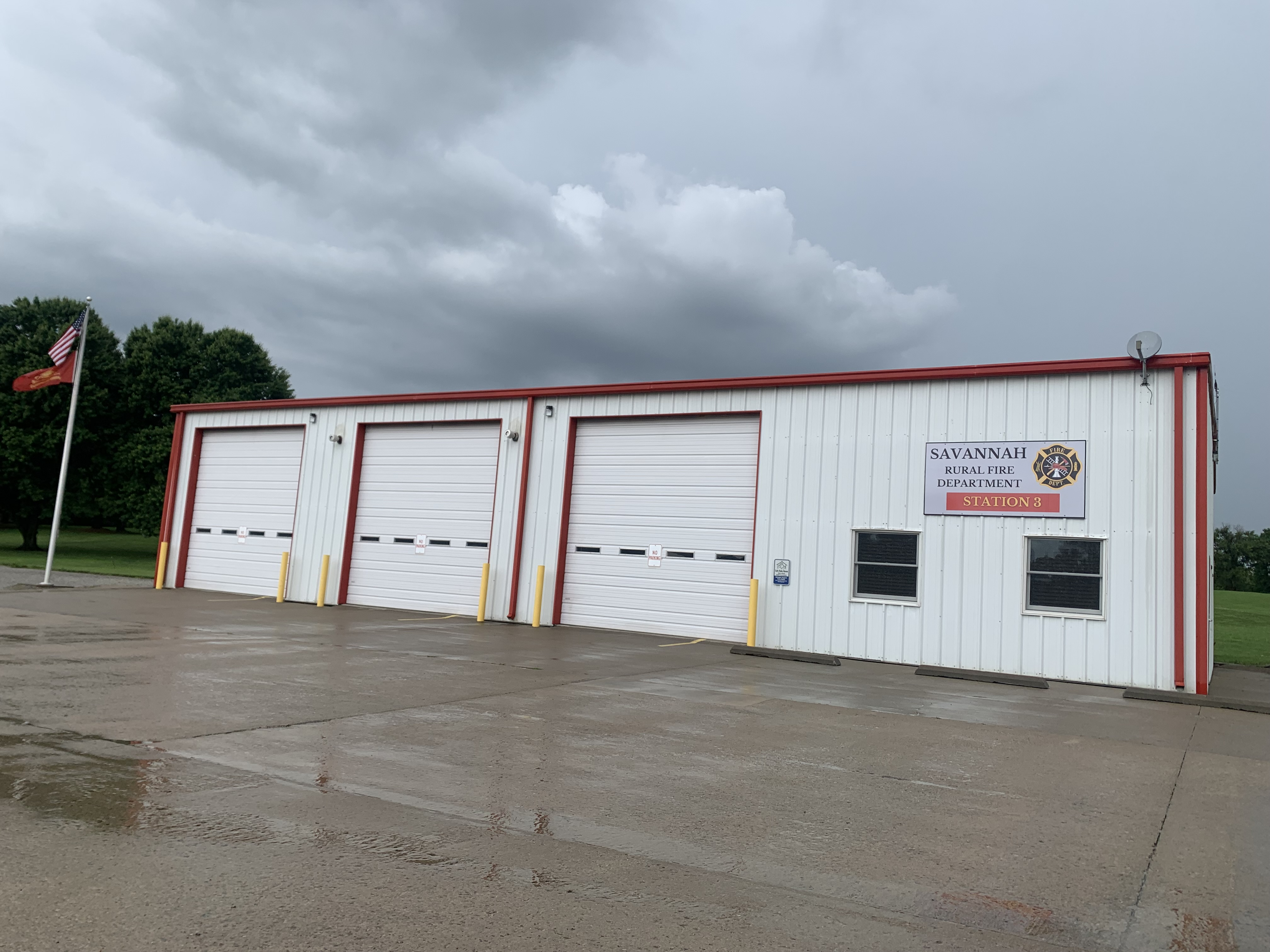
Fire Station 3 in central Country Club

According to the United States Census Bureau, the village has a total area of 3.94 square miles (10.20 km^{2}), of which 3.91 square miles (10.13 km^{2}) is land and 0.03 square miles (0.08 km^{2}) is water.

== Demographics ==
Historical population
Census	Pop.	Note	%±
1960	395		—
1970	943		138.7%
1980	1,234		30.9%
1990	1,755		42.2%
2000	1,846		5.2%
2010	2,449		32.7%
2020	2,487		1.6%
U.S. Decennial Census

=== 2020 census ===
As of the 2020 census, Country Club had a population of 2,487. The median age was 42.0 years. 22.9% of residents were under the age of 18 and 20.5% of residents were 65 years of age or older. For every 100 females there were 93.8 males, and for every 100 females age 18 and over there were 92.5 males age 18 and over.

74.3% of residents lived in urban areas, while 25.7% lived in rural areas.

There were 996 households in Country Club, of which 30.7% had children under the age of 18 living in them. Of all households, 54.4% were married-couple households, 15.7% were households with a male householder and no spouse or partner present, and 22.3% were households with a female householder and no spouse or partner present. About 22.8% of all households were made up of individuals and 10.4% had someone living alone who was 65 years of age or older.

There were 1,062 housing units, of which 6.2% were vacant. The homeowner vacancy rate was 0.7% and the rental vacancy rate was 10.1%.

Racial composition as of the 2020 census
Race	Number	Percent
White	2,237	89.9%
Black or African American	82	3.3%
American Indian and Alaska Native	11	0.4%
Asian	16	0.6%
Native Hawaiian and Other Pacific Islander	0	0.0%
Some other race	17	0.7%
Two or more races	124	5.0%
Hispanic or Latino (of any race)	73	2.9%

=== 2010 census ===
As of the census of 2010, there were 2,449 people, 960 households, and 721 families living in the village. The population density was 626.3 inhabitants per square mile (241.8/km^{2}). There were 1,012 housing units at an average density of 258.8 per square mile (99.9/km^{2}). The racial makeup of the village was 95.1% White, 1.6% African American, 0.5% Native American, 0.6% Asian, 0.4% from other races, and 1.7% from two or more races. Hispanic or Latino of any race were 3.1% of the population.

There were 960 households, of which 31.6% had children under the age of 18 living with them, 61.4% were married couples living together, 9.0% had a female householder with no husband present, 4.8% had a male householder with no wife present, and 24.9% were non-families. 19.0% of all households were made up of individuals, and 7.3% had someone living alone who was 65 years of age or older. The average household size was 2.55 and the average family size was 2.89.

The median age in the village was 39.6 years. 22.3% of residents were under the age of 18; 9.4% were between the ages of 18 and 24; 24.7% were from 25 to 44; 29.8% were from 45 to 64; and 13.8% were 65 years of age or older. The gender makeup of the village was 48.9% male and 51.1% female.

=== 2000 census ===
As of the census of 2000, there were 1,846 people, 684 households, and 521 families living in the village. The population density was 1,580.3 inhabitants per square mile (610.2/km^{2}). There were 703 housing units at an average density of 601.8 per square mile (232.4/km^{2}). The racial makeup of the village was 97.18% White, 1.73% African American, 0.16% Native American, 0.27% Asian, 0.38% from other races, and 0.27% from two or more races. Hispanic or Latino of any race were 1.08% of the population.

There were 684 households, out of which 38.7% had children under the age of 18 living with them, 63.7% were married couples living together, 8.9% had a female householder with no husband present, and 23.7% were non-families. 18.9% of all households were made up of individuals, and 6.9% had someone living alone who was 65 years of age or older. The average household size was 2.70 and the average family size was 3.08.

In the village, the population was spread out, with 27.7% under the age of 18, 8.8% from 18 to 24, 29.5% from 25 to 44, 23.6% from 45 to 64, and 10.3% who were 65 years of age or older. The median age was 35 years. For every 100 females, there were 95.8 males. For every 100 females age 18 and over, there were 94.5 males.

The median income for a household in the village was $45,987, and the median income for a family was $50,789. Males had a median income of $35,326 versus $23,182 for females. The per capita income for the village was $19,871. About 2.9% of families and 3.1% of the population were below the poverty line, including 2.8% of those under age 18 and 1.1% of those age 65 or over.

== Education ==
It is in the Savannah R-III School District.

== See also ==
- List of cities in Missouri
