= Cosby, Missouri =

Village in Andrew County, Missouri, United States

- Village
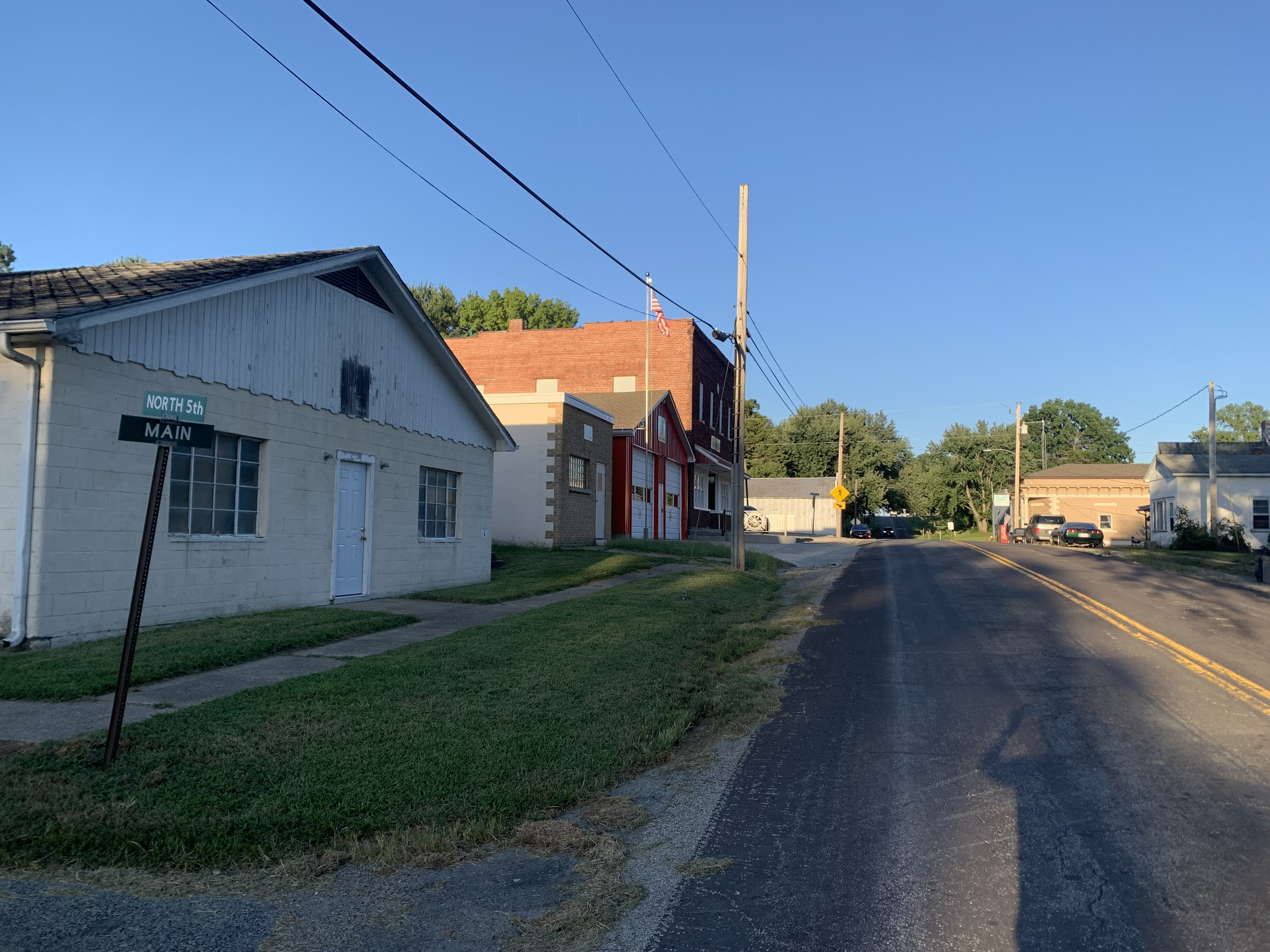
- Cosby downtown, facing east, August 2025

- Location of Cosby, Missouri
- Coordinates: 39°51′50″N 94°40′47″W
- Country: United States
- State: Missouri
- County: Andrew
- Township: Monroe
- Incorporated: 1905

Area
  - Total: 0.093 sq mi (0.24 km^{2})
  - Land: 0.093 sq mi (0.24 km^{2})
  - Water: 0 sq mi (0.00 km^{2})
- Elevation: 929 ft (283 m)

Population (2020)
  - Total: 114
  - Density: 1,212.2/sq mi (468.03/km^{2})
- Time zone: UTC-6 (Central (CST))
  - Summer (DST): UTC-5 (CDT)
- ZIP code: 64436
- Area code: 816
- FIPS code: 29-16588
- GNIS feature ID: 2398633

Cosby is a village in Monroe Township, Andrew County, Missouri, United States. The population was 114 at the 2020 census. It is part of the St. Joseph, MO–KS Metropolitan Statistical Area.

== History ==
Cosby was founded in the late 1870s, and moved about one mile (1.6 km) to a new town site in 1885 when the railroad was extended to that point. The village was named after Cosby Miller, the child of a first settler. A post office called Cosby has been in operation since 1879.

== Geography ==
According to the United States Census Bureau, the village has a total area of 0.09 square miles (0.23 km^{2}), all land.

== Demographics ==
Historical population
Census	Pop.	Note	%±
1910	170		—
1920	163		−4.1%
1930	161		−1.2%
1940	162		0.6%
1950	142		−12.3%
1960	119		−16.2%
1970	130		9.2%
1980	148		13.8%
1990	121		−18.2%
2000	143		18.2%
2010	124		−13.3%
2020	114		−8.1%
U.S. Decennial Census

=== 2010 census ===
As of the census of 2010, there were 124 people, 45 households, and 34 families living in the village. The population density was 1,377.8 inhabitants per square mile (532.0/km^{2}). There were 52 housing units at an average density of 577.8 per square mile (223.1/km^{2}). The racial makeup of the village was 99.2% White and 0.8% from other races. Hispanic or Latino of any race were 0.8% of the population.

There were 45 households, of which 44.4% had children under the age of 18 living with them, 64.4% were married couples living together, 6.7% had a female householder with no husband present, 4.4% had a male householder with no wife present, and 24.4% were non-families. 17.8% of all households were made up of individuals, and 13.4% had someone living alone who was 65 years of age or older. The average household size was 2.76 and the average family size was 3.12.

The median age in the village was 35 years. 29% of residents were under the age of 18; 8.1% were between the ages of 18 and 24; 26.6% were from 25 to 44; 24.2% were from 45 to 64; and 12.1% were 65 years of age or older. The gender makeup of the village was 51.6% male and 48.4% female.

=== 2000 census ===
As of the census of 2000, there were 143 people, 55 households, and 37 families living in the village. The population density was 1,525.5 inhabitants per square mile (589.0/km^{2}). There were 57 housing units at an average density of 608.1 per square mile (234.8/km^{2}). The racial makeup of the village was 99.30% White and 0.70% Native American. Hispanic or Latino of any race were 2.10% of the population.

There were 55 households, out of which 36.4% had children under the age of 18 living with them, 60.0% were married couples living together, 1.8% had a female householder with no husband present, and 32.7% were non-families. 25.5% of all households were made up of individuals, and 7.3% had someone living alone who was 65 years of age or older. The average household size was 2.60 and the average family size was 3.22.

In the village, the population was spread out, with 28.7% under the age of 18, 5.6% from 18 to 24, 35.7% from 25 to 44, 18.9% from 45 to 64, and 11.2% who were 65 years of age or older. The median age was 35 years. For every 100 females, there were 95.9 males. For every 100 females age 18 and over, there were 92.5 males.

The median income for a household in the village was $35,938, and the median income for a family was $37,292. Males had a median income of $25,750 versus $22,500 for females. The per capita income for the village was $19,121. There were none of the families and 4.5% of the population living below the poverty line, including no under eighteens and none of those over 64.

== Education ==
It is in the Savannah R-III School District.

Avenue City R-IX School District, which operates Avenue City Elementary School, has a Cosby postal address. The school is not in the Cosby village limits, and its boundary does not include any part of the Cosby village limits.

== Notable people ==
- Dan Hegeman, state senator
- Ivan Schottel, American football coach

== See also ==
- List of cities in Missouri
