= Bolckow, Missouri =

City in Andrew County, Missouri, United States

- City
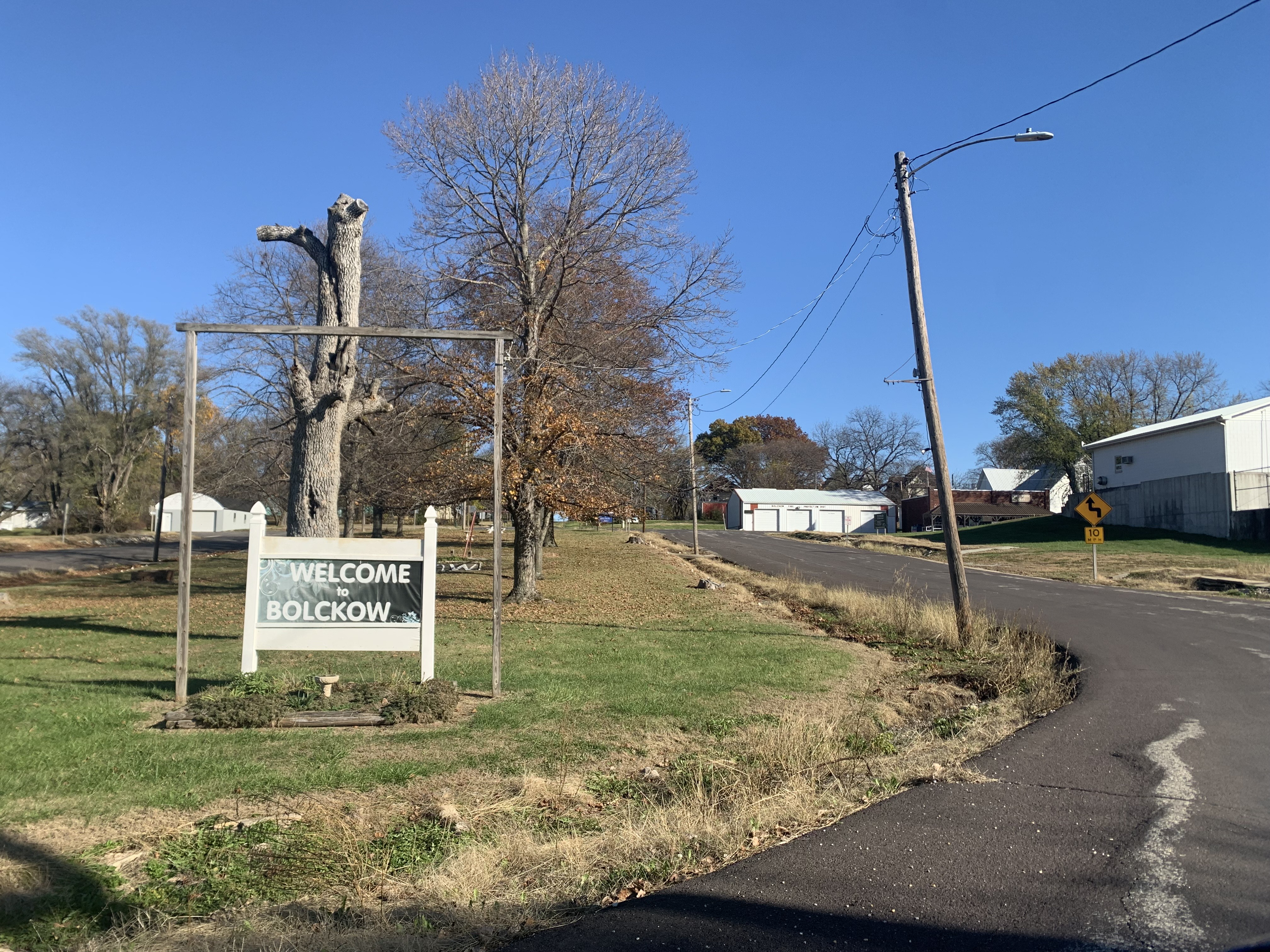
- Bolckow, Missouri on Route B viewing east, November 2024

- Location of Bolckow, Missouri
- Coordinates: 40°06′55″N 94°49′16″W
- Country: United States
- State: Missouri
- County: Andrew
- Township: Benton
- Founded: 1868

Area
  - Total: 0.32 sq mi (0.84 km^{2})
  - Land: 0.32 sq mi (0.84 km^{2})
  - Water: 0 sq mi (0.00 km^{2})
- Elevation: 951 ft (290 m)

Population (2020)
  - Total: 163
  - Density: 501.6/sq mi (193.68/km^{2})
- Time zone: UTC-6 (Central (CST))
  - Summer (DST): UTC-5 (CDT)
- ZIP code: 64427
- Area codes: 816, 975
- FIPS code: 29-06922
- GNIS feature ID: 2394215

Bolckow is a city in Benton Township, Andrew County, Missouri, United States. The population was 163 at the 2020 Census. It is part of the St. Joseph metropolitan area.

== History ==
Bolckow was founded in 1868. The city was named for Bolckow, an official of the Platte Co. Railroad. It was formerly called St. John. A post office called Bolckow has been in operation since 1869. A variant spelling was Bolkow.

== Geography ==
According to the United States Census Bureau, the city has a total area of 0.33 square miles (0.85 km^{2}), all land.

== Demographics ==
Historical population
Census	Pop.	Note	%±
1880	346		—
1890	405		17.1%
1900	378		−6.7%
1910	376		−0.5%
1920	334		−11.2%
1930	353		5.7%
1940	341		−3.4%
1950	250		−26.7%
1960	232		−7.2%
1970	225		−3.0%
1980	245		8.9%
1990	253		3.3%
2000	234		−7.5%
2010	187		−20.1%
2020	163		−12.8%
U.S. Decennial Census

=== 2010 census ===
As of the census of 2010, there were 187 people, 78 households, and 54 families residing in the city. The population density was 566.7 inhabitants per square mile (218.8/km^{2}). There were 96 housing units at an average density of 290.9 per square mile (112.3/km^{2}). The racial makeup of the city was 98.4% White, 0.5% Asian, and 1.1% from two or more races. Hispanic or Latino of any race were 0.5% of the population.

There were 78 households, of which 33.3% had children under the age of 18 living with them, 47.4% were married couples living together, 12.8% had a female householder with no husband present, 9.0% had a male householder with no wife present, and 30.8% were non-families. 26.9% of all households were made up of individuals, and 8.9% had someone living alone who was 65 years of age or older. The average household size was 2.40 and the average family size was 2.87.

The median age in the city was 33.5 years. 25.7% of residents were under the age of 18; 5.8% were between the ages of 18 and 24; 30.4% were from 25 to 44; 22.6% were from 45 to 64; and 15.5% were 65 years of age or older. The gender makeup of the city was 50.3% male and 49.7% female.

=== 2000 census ===
As of the census of 2000, there were 234 people, 89 households, and 64 families residing in the city. The population density was 720.2 inhabitants per square mile (278.1/km^{2}). There were 98 housing units at an average density of 301.6 per square mile (116.4/km^{2}). The racial makeup of the city was 99.57% White and 0.43% Native American.

There were 89 households, out of which 37.1% had children under the age of 18 living with them, 53.9% were married couples living together, 9.0% had a female householder with no husband present, and 27.0% were non-families. 21.3% of all households were made up of individuals, and 4.5% had someone living alone who was 65 years of age or older. The average household size was 2.63 and the average family size was 3.05.

In the city the population was spread out, with 28.2% under the age of 18, 12.8% from 18 to 24, 28.2% from 25 to 44, 20.9% from 45 to 64, and 9.8% who were 65 years of age or older. The median age was 32 years. For every 100 females, there were 98.3 males. For every 100 females age 18 and over, there were 107.4 males.

The median income for a household in the city was $26,250, and the median income for a family was $29,063. Males had a median income of $25,000 versus $22,083 for females. The per capita income for the city was $13,028. About 12.5% of families and 15.5% of the population were below the poverty line, including 6.0% of those under the age of eighteen and 69.2% of those 65 or over.

== Education ==
It is in the North Andrew County R-VI School District.

== See also ==
- List of cities in Missouri
