= Andrew County, Missouri =

County in Missouri, United States

- County
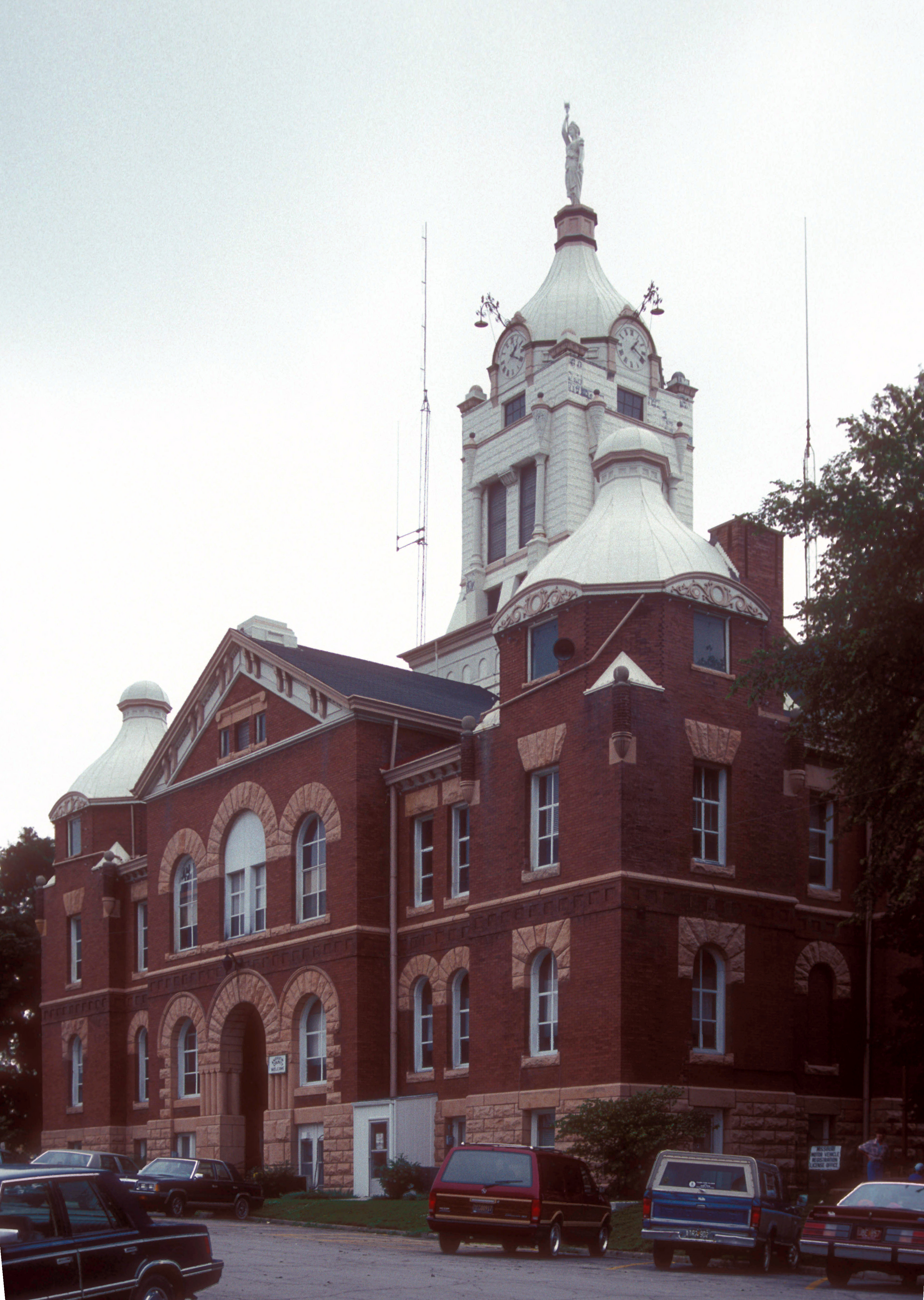
- Andrew County Courthouse

- Logo

- Location within the U.S. state of Missouri
- Coordinates: 39°59′N 94°48′W
- Country: United States
- State: Missouri
- Founded: January 29, 1841
- Named for: Andrew Jackson Davis
- Seat: Savannah
- Largest city: Savannah

Area
  - Total: 436 sq mi (1,130 km^{2})
  - Land: 433 sq mi (1,120 km^{2})
  - Water: 3.7 sq mi (9.6 km^{2}) 0.9%

Population (2020)
  - Total: 18,135
  - Estimate (2025): 18,241 ▲
  - Density: 41.9/sq mi (16.2/km^{2})
- Time zone: UTC−6 (Central)
  - Summer (DST): UTC−5 (CDT)
- Congressional district: 6th
- Website: www.andrewcounty.org

Andrew County is a county located in the northwestern part of the U.S. state of Missouri. As of the 2020 census, the county had a population of 18,135. Its county seat is Savannah. The county was organized on January 29, 1841, and named for Andrew Jackson Davis, a lawyer and prominent citizen of St. Louis.

Andrew County is part of the St. Joseph, MO–KS Metropolitan Statistical Area, which is included in the Kansas City, MO–KS Combined statistical area.

== History ==
The following material is inscribed on a plaque erected by the State Historical Society of Missouri and State Highway Commission in 1960, now located by the Andrew County Courthouse:

Andrew County, organized 1841, is one of six counties in the Indian Platte Purchase Territory annexed to Missouri in 1837. Named for Andrew Jackson Davis, a St. Louis editor, the county was first settled in the middle 1830s. Pioneers were from Ohio, Ind., Tenn., Ky., VA., and other parts of Missouri. Savannah, the county seat, was laid out in 1841. First briefly called Union, it was renamed for Savannah, Georgia. The Platte County Railroad (CB&Q) reached there in 1860, and today's Chicago, Great Western in the late 1880s. The town grew as a shipping point and trading center.

A divided county during the Civil War, Andrew sent troops to both sides. In Aug., 1861 come 1500 from Andrew and other counties joined the pro-Southern Mo. State Guard at Camp Highly in eastern Andrew County while others joined a large Union cap in adjacent Gentry County. In 1861, Union troops seized “Northwest Democrat,” a pro-Southern newspaper, in Savannah and troops from Camp Highly seized the “Plain Dealer,” Union newspaper. Raiding Guerrilla bands overran the county through 1863.

Andrew County's glacial plains support fertile livestock, grain, and fruit farms. The One Hundred and Two River, along with the Platte River, are located in the county. Its western border is formed by the Nodaway and Missouri rivers. In 1804 the Lewis and Clark Expedition camped on an island at the mouth of the Nodaway River. Members of fur trader W. Price Hunt's 1811 Astorian expedition wintered near the river's mouth as well.

Among the towns located in Andrew County are Amazonia, once on the Missouri River, now inland, laid out in 1857 near the site of Nodaway City, an early river port; Fillmore, established in 1845; Whitesville, established in 1848; Rochester, established in 1848; Bolckow, established in 1868; Rosendale, established in 1869; Rea, established in 1877; Helena, established in 1878; and Cosby, established in 1882.

The Andrew County Museum & Historical Society celebrates the history of Andrew County through exhibits, programs, publications, and special events. The museum and society collects, preserves, researches, and interprets documents and artifacts to promote the appreciation and preservation of the county's history and bring history to life in Andrew County.

During the American Civil War, local residents served in various Union regiments, including the 18th and 33rd Missouri Infantry. The wartime experiences and local conditions in Andrew County during this period were documented in the wartime correspondence of local soldiers James Calaway Hale and Benjamin Petree of the Savannah area, which was later compiled and published in 2024.

== Geography ==
According to the U.S. Census Bureau, the county has a total area of 436 square miles (1,130 km^{2}), of which 433 square miles (1,120 km^{2}) is land and 3.7 square miles (9.6 km^{2}) (0.9%) is water.

=== Adjacent counties ===
- Nodaway County (north)
- Gentry County (northeast)
- DeKalb County (east)
- Buchanan County (south)
- Doniphan County, Kansas (southwest)
- Holt County (west)

=== Major highways ===
- Interstate 29
- Interstate 229
- U.S. Route 59
- U.S. Route 71
- U.S. Route 169
- Route 48

== Demographics ==
Historical population
Census	Pop.	Note	%±
1850	9,433		—
1860	11,850		25.6%
1870	15,137		27.7%
1880	16,318		7.8%
1890	16,000		−1.9%
1900	17,332		8.3%
1910	15,282		−11.8%
1920	14,075		−7.9%
1930	13,469		−4.3%
1940	13,015		−3.4%
1950	11,727		−9.9%
1960	11,062		−5.7%
1970	11,913		7.7%
1980	13,908		16.7%
1990	14,632		5.2%
2000	16,492		12.7%
2010	17,291		4.8%
2020	18,135		4.9%
2025 (est.)	18,241	▲	0.6%
U.S. Decennial Census; 1790-1960 1900-1990; 1990-2000 2010-2015

=== 2020 census ===
Andrew County, Missouri – Racial and ethnic composition Note: the US Census treats Hispanic/Latino as an ethnic category. This table excludes Latinos from the racial categories and assigns them to a separate category. Hispanics/Latinos may be of any race.
Race / Ethnicity (NH = Non-Hispanic)	Pop 1980	Pop 1990	Pop 2000	Pop 2010	Pop 2020	% 1980	% 1990	% 2000	% 2010	% 2020
White alone (NH)	13,849	14,437	16,129	16,641	16,756	99.06%	98.67%	97.80%	96.24%	92.40%
Black or African American alone (NH)	9	30	67	70	138	0.06%	0.21%	0.41%	0.40%	0.76%
Native American or Alaska Native alone (NH)	16	39	51	46	40	0.11%	0.27%	0.31%	0.27%	0.22%
Asian alone (NH)	21	23	37	75	89	0.15%	0.16%	0.22%	0.43%	0.49%
Native Hawaiian or Pacific Islander alone (NH)	x	x	1	0	0	x	x	0.01%	0.00%	0.00%
Other race alone (NH)	15	0	3	4	44	0.11%	0.00%	0.02%	0.02%	0.24%
Mixed race or Multiracial (NH)	x	x	66	165	677	x	x	0.40%	0.95%	3.73%
Hispanic or Latino (any race)	70	103	138	290	391	0.50%	0.70%	0.84%	1.68%	2.16%
Total	13,980	14,632	16,492	17,291	18,135	100.00%	100.00%	100.00%	100.00%	100.00%

As of the 2020 census, the county had a population of 18,135. The median age was 41.1 years, 24.4% of residents were under the age of 18, and 19.1% of residents were 65 years of age or older. For every 100 females there were 98.5 males, and for every 100 females age 18 and over there were 95.9 males age 18 and over.

According to the 2020 Decennial Census Demographic and Housing Characteristics (DHC) data, 39.6% of residents lived in urban areas while 60.4% lived in rural areas.

The racial makeup of the county was 93.2% White, 0.9% Black or African American, 0.3% American Indian and Alaska Native, 0.5% Asian, 0.0% Native Hawaiian and Pacific Islander, 0.5% from some other race, and 4.7% from two or more races. Hispanic or Latino residents of any race comprised 2.2% of the population.

There were 7,065 households in the county, of which 32.9% had children under the age of 18 living with them and 20.6% had a female householder with no spouse or partner present. About 23.9% of all households were made up of individuals and 12.0% had someone living alone who was 65 years of age or older.

There were 7,551 housing units, of which 6.4% were vacant. Among occupied housing units, 78.5% were owner-occupied and 21.5% were renter-occupied. The homeowner vacancy rate was 1.1% and the rental vacancy rate was 5.9%.

=== 2000 census ===
As of the census of 2000, there were 16,492 people, 6,273 households, and 4,635 families residing in the county. The population density was 38 inhabitants per square mile (15/km^{2}). There were 6,662 housing units at an average density of 15 units per square mile (5.8 units/km^{2}). The racial makeup of the county was 98.38% White, 0.42% Black or African American, 0.34% Native American, 0.22% Asian, 0.01% Pacific Islander, 0.18% from other races, and 0.45% from two or more races. Approximately 0.84% of the population were Hispanic or Latino of any race.

There were 6,273 households, out of which 34.50% had children under the age of 18 living with them, 62.70% were married couples living together, 7.40% had a female householder with no husband present, and 26.10% were non-families. 22.30% of all households were made up of individuals, and 10.50% had someone living alone who was 65 years of age or older. The average household size was 2.59 and the average family size was 3.03.

In the county, the population was spread out, with 26.40% under the age of 18, 7.90% from 18 to 24, 27.60% from 25 to 44, 23.70% from 45 to 64, and 14.40% who were 65 years of age or older. The median age was 38 years. For every 100 females, there were 95.00 males. For every 100 females age 18 and over, there were 93.00 males.

The median income for a household in the county was $40,688, and the median income for a family was $46,067. Males had a median income of $32,955 versus $22,586 for females. The per capita income for the county was $19,375. About 6.40% of families and 8.20% of the population were below the poverty line, including 10.50% of those under age 18 and 8.00% of those age 65 or over.

=== Religion ===
According to the Association of Religion Data Archives County Membership Report (2010), Andrew County is sometimes regarded as being on the northern edge of the Bible Belt, with evangelical Protestantism being the most predominant religion. The most predominant denominations among residents in Andrew County who adhere to a religion are Southern Baptists (38.62%), United Methodists (21.14%), and Disciples of Christ (9.86%).

== Education ==
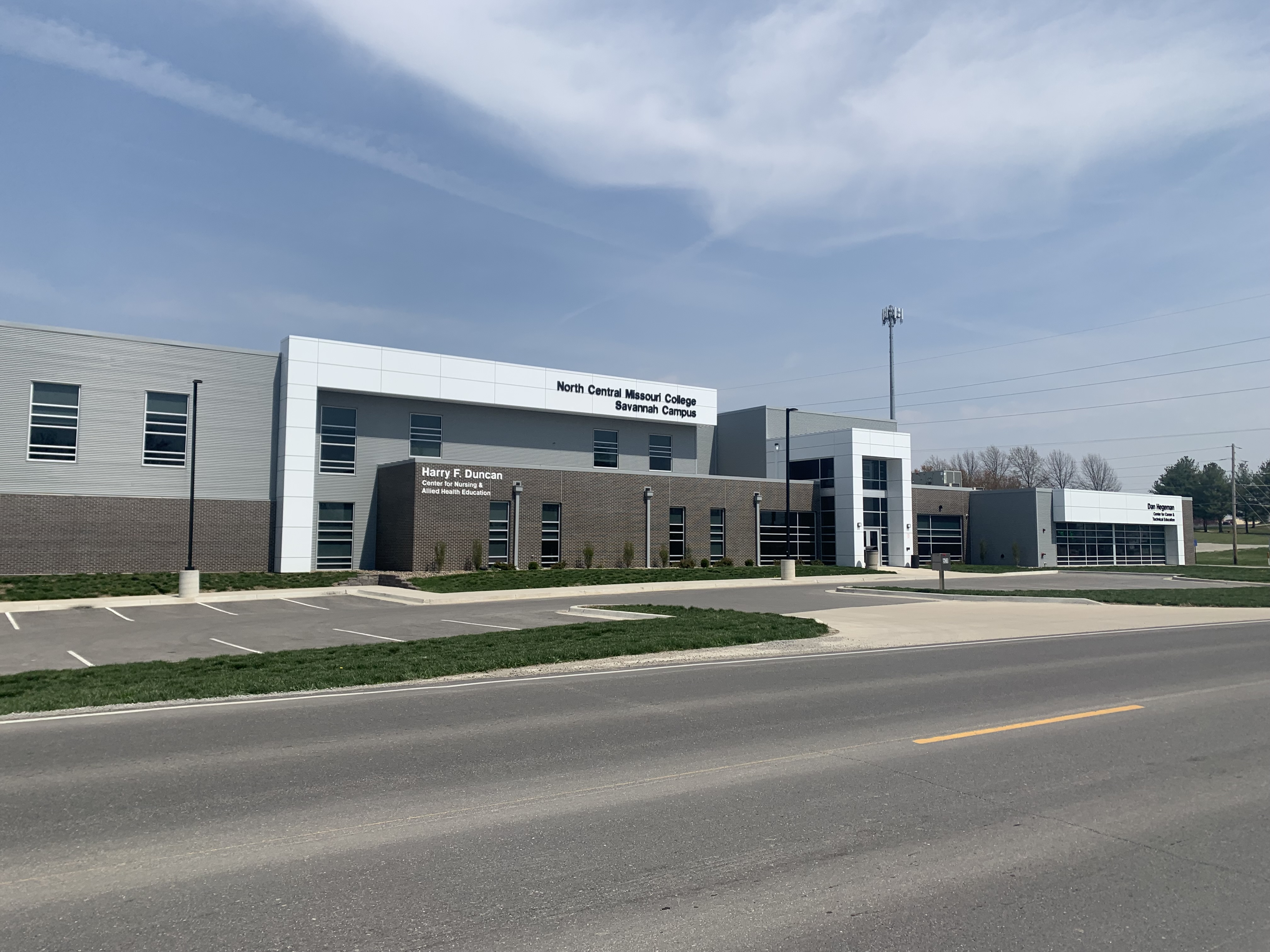
Savannah Campus of North Central Missouri College

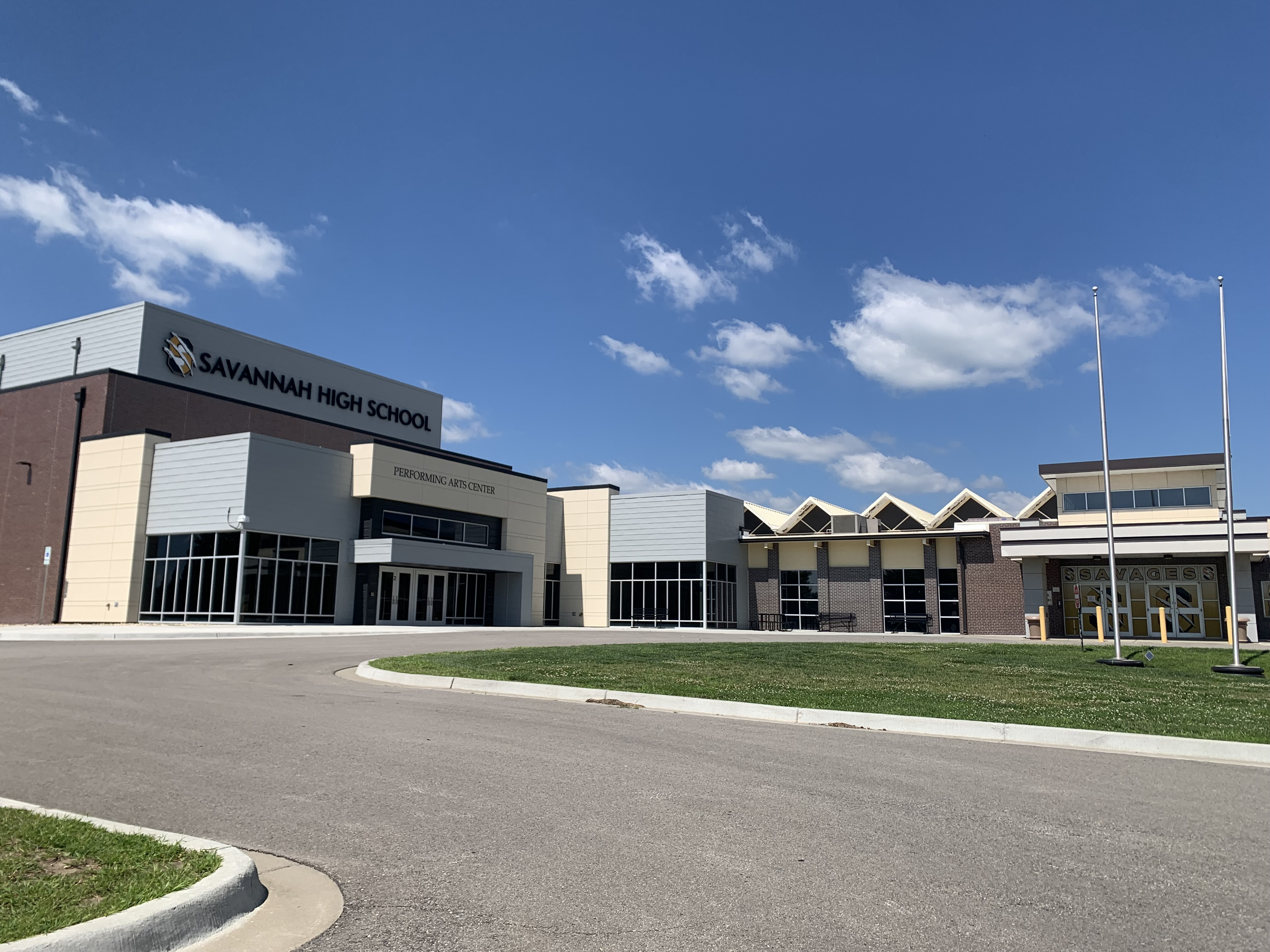
Savannah High School

K-12 school districts with territory in the county, no matter how slight, even if the relevant schools/administration buildings are in other counties, include:

- King City R-I School District
- Nodaway-Holt R-VII School District
- North Andrew County R-VI School District
- Savannah R-III School District
- South Nodaway County R-IV School District
- Union Star R-II School District

There is also one elementary school district, Avenue City R-IX School District.

=== Public schools ===
- Avenue City R-IX School District – Cosby
  - Avenue City Elementary School (PK-08)
- North Andrew County R-VI School District – Rosendale
  - North Andrew County Elementary School (K-05)
  - North Andrew County Middle School (06-08)
  - North Andrew High School (09-12)
- Savannah R-III School District – Savannah
  - Savannah Early Learning Center (PK)
  - Amazonia Elementary School (K-05)
  - Helena Elementary School (K-05)
  - John Glenn Elementary School (K-05)
  - Minnie Cline Elementary School (K-05)
  - Savannah Middle School (06-08)
  - Savannah High School (09-12)

=== Public libraries ===
- Rolling Hills Consolidated Library—Savannah Branch

== Communities ==
=== Cities ===
- Amazonia
- Bolckow
- Fillmore
- Rosendale
- Savannah (county seat)

=== Villages ===
- Cosby
- Country Club
- Rea

=== Unincorporated communities ===
- Avenue City
- Flag Springs
- Helena
- Nodaway
- Rochester
- Whitesville
- Wyeth

=== Extinct Hamlets ===
- Dallas
- Empire Prairie
- Fountainbleau
- Jimtown
- Kodiak
- Rankin

=== Townships ===
Andrew County is divided into 10 townships:

- Benton
- Clay
- Empire
- Jackson
- Jefferson
- Lincoln
- Monroe
- Nodaway
- Platte
- Rochester

=== Population ranking ===
The population ranking of the following table is based on the 2020 US census of Andrew County.

† County seat

Rank	Name	Municipal Type	Population
1	Savannah †	4th Class City	5,069
2	Country Club	Village	2,487
3	Amazonia	4th Class City	238
4	Fillmore	4th Class City	173
5	Bolckow	4th Class City	163
6	Rosendale	4th Class City	119
7	Cosby	Village	114
8	Rea	Village	46

== Politics ==
=== Local ===
Republicans control politics at the local level in Andrew County. They hold every elected position in the county.

Andrew County, Missouri

Elected countywide officials
Assessor	Paul Garrison	Republican
Circuit Clerk	Christy Porter	Republican
County Clerk	Sarah Miller	Republican
Collector	Phil Rogers	Republican
Commissioner (presiding)	Bob Caldwell	Republican
Commissioner (district 1)	Fritz Hegeman	Republican
Commissioner (district 2)	Gary Baumann	Republican
Coroner	Doug Johnson	Republican
Prosecuting Attorney	Steven Stevenson	Republican
Public Administrator	Gary Chambers	Republican
Recorder	Chanler Williams	Republican
Sheriff	Grant Gillett	Republican
Surveyor	F. Shane Terhune	Republican
Treasurer	Cindy Esely	Republican

=== State ===
Past Gubernatorial Elections Results
Year	Republican	Democratic	Third Parties
2024	75.54% 7,311	22.09% 2,138	2.36% 229
2020	73.92% 7,195	24.21% 2,356	1.50% 146
2016	63.22% 5,771	34.79% 3,176	1.98% 181
2012	51.99% 4,301	44.63% 3,692	3.38% 280
2008	48.09% 4,174	49.69% 4,313	2.22% 192
2004	60.70% 5,001	38.15% 3,143	1.15% 95
2000	54.55% 3,943	43.47% 3,142	1.98% 143
1996	37.24% 2,607	60.33% 4,223	2.43% 170
1992	50.00% 3,657	50.00% 3,657	0.00% 0

All of Andrew County is a part of Missouri's 9th District in the Missouri House of Representatives and is represented by Dean Van Schoiack (R-Savannah).

Missouri House of Representatives — District 9 — Andrew County (2020)
Party	Candidate	Votes	%	±%
Republican	Dean Van Schoiack	7,449	77.77%	+8.35
Democratic	Karen Planalp	2,129	22.23	−8.35

All of Andrew County is a part of Missouri's 12th District in the Missouri Senate and is currently represented by Dan Hegemen (R-Cosby).

Missouri Senate — District 9 — Andrew County (2018)
Party	Candidate	Votes	%	±%
Republican	Dan Hegeman	5,775	77.09%	−22.91
Democratic	Terry Richard	1,716	22.91%	+22.91

=== Federal ===
All of Andrew County is included in Missouri's 6th Congressional District and is currently represented by Sam Graves (R-Tarkio) in the U.S. House of Representatives. Graves was elected to an eleventh term in 2020 over Democratic challenger Gena Ross.

U.S. House of Representatives – Missouri’s 6th Congressional District – Andrew County (2020)
Party	Candidate	Votes	%	±%
Republican	Sam Graves	7,420	76.98%	+3.89
Democratic	Gena L. Ross	2,002	20.77%	−2.39
Libertarian	Jim Higgins	217	2.25%	−1.50

Andrew County, along with the rest of the state of Missouri, is represented in the U.S. Senate by Josh Hawley (R-Columbia) and Roy Blunt (R-Strafford).

U.S. Senate – Class I – Andrew County (2018)
Party	Candidate	Votes	%	±%
Republican	Josh Hawley	4,919	64.81%	+20.26
Democratic	Claire McCaskill	2,372	31.25%	−16.80
Independent	Craig O'Dear	143	1.88%	
Libertarian	Japheth Campbell	120	1.58%	−5.81
Green	Jo Crain	36	0.47%	+0.47

Blunt was elected to a second term in 2016 over then-Missouri Secretary of State Jason Kander.

U.S. Senate — Class III — Andrew County (2016)
Party	Candidate	Votes	%	±%
Republican	Roy Blunt	5,610	61.63%	+17.08
Democratic	Jason Kander	3,122	34.30%	−13.75
Libertarian	Jonathan Dine	213	2.34%	−5.05
Green	Johnathan McFarland	83	0.91%	+0.91
Constitution	Fred Ryman	74	0.81%	+0.81

==== Political culture ====
United States presidential election results for Andrew County, Missouri
Year	Republican		Democratic		Third party(ies)	
Year	No.	%	No.	%	No.	%
1888	1,976	52.88%	1,691	45.25%	70	1.87%
1892	1,834	48.54%	1,505	39.84%	439	11.62%
1896	2,252	50.26%	2,191	48.90%	38	0.85%
1900	2,356	53.05%	2,022	45.53%	63	1.42%
1904	2,306	56.45%	1,691	41.40%	88	2.15%
1908	2,169	54.09%	1,782	44.44%	59	1.47%
1912	1,634	42.02%	1,750	45.00%	505	12.99%
1916	2,087	52.49%	1,853	46.60%	36	0.91%
1920	3,913	60.86%	2,466	38.36%	50	0.78%
1924	3,535	55.36%	2,648	41.47%	202	3.16%
1928	4,243	66.58%	2,118	33.23%	12	0.19%
1932	2,826	46.04%	3,280	53.44%	32	0.52%
1936	3,987	51.83%	3,702	48.12%	4	0.05%
1940	4,384	58.81%	3,059	41.04%	11	0.15%
1944	3,734	62.29%	2,254	37.60%	7	0.12%
1948	3,142	54.84%	2,576	44.96%	11	0.19%
1952	4,452	67.85%	2,104	32.06%	6	0.09%
1956	3,609	60.13%	2,393	39.87%	0	0.00%
1960	3,716	63.13%	2,170	36.87%	0	0.00%
1964	2,594	44.69%	3,211	55.31%	0	0.00%
1968	3,398	58.97%	2,005	34.80%	359	6.23%
1972	4,180	71.26%	1,686	28.74%	0	0.00%
1976	3,130	50.38%	3,042	48.96%	41	0.66%
1980	3,690	56.14%	2,575	39.18%	308	4.69%
1984	4,252	63.38%	2,457	36.62%	0	0.00%
1988	3,407	52.08%	3,108	47.51%	27	0.41%
1992	2,652	35.41%	2,675	35.72%	2,162	28.87%
1996	3,281	46.20%	2,807	39.53%	1,013	14.27%
2000	4,257	58.52%	2,795	38.42%	222	3.05%
2004	5,135	62.12%	3,069	37.13%	62	0.75%
2008	5,279	60.06%	3,345	38.05%	166	1.89%
2012	5,457	65.42%	2,649	31.76%	235	2.82%
2016	6,665	72.49%	2,045	22.24%	484	5.26%
2020	7,255	74.39%	2,351	24.11%	146	1.50%
2024	7,407	75.22%	2,312	23.48%	128	1.30%

At the presidential level, Andrew County is solidly Republican. Andrew County strongly favored Donald Trump in both 2016 and 2020. Bill Clinton was the last Democratic presidential nominee to carry Andrew County in 1992 with a plurality of the vote, and a Democrat hasn't won majority support from the county's voters in a presidential election since Lyndon Johnson in 1964.

Like most rural areas throughout northwest Missouri, voters in Andrew County generally adhere to socially and culturally conservative principles which tend to influence their Republican leanings. Despite Andrew County's longstanding tradition of supporting socially conservative platforms, voters in the county have a penchant for advancing populist causes. In 2018, Missourians voted on a proposition (Proposition A) concerning right to work, the outcome of which ultimately reversed the right to work legislation passed in the state the previous year. 67.18% of Andrew County voters cast their ballots to overturn the law.

=== Missouri presidential preference primaries ===
==== 2020 ====
The 2020 presidential primaries for both the Democratic and Republican parties were held in Missouri on March 10. On the Democratic side, former Vice President Joe Biden (D-Delaware) both won statewide and carried Andrew County by a wide margin. Biden went on to defeat President Donald Trump in the general election.

Missouri Democratic Presidential Primary – Andrew County (2020)
Party	Candidate	Votes	%	±%
Democratic	Joe Biden	818	62.35	
Democratic	Bernie Sanders	415	31.63	
Democratic	Tulsi Gabbard	18	1.37	
Democratic	Others/Uncommitted	61	4.65	

Incumbent President Donald Trump (R-Florida) faced a primary challenge from former Massachusetts Governor Bill Weld, but won both Andrew County and statewide by large margins.

Missouri Republican Presidential Primary – Andrew County (2020)
Party	Candidate	Votes	%	±%
Republican	Donald Trump	1,220	97.52	
Republican	Bill Weld	3	0.24	
Republican	Others/Uncommitted	28	2.24	

== Notable people ==
- John P. Altgeld, Governor of Illinois from 1893 to 1897, lived in Savannah
- Eminem, American rapper, lived in Savannah and attended middle school there
- Nellie Tayloe Ross, the first female Governor of Wyoming (1925-1927) and first elected female Governor of any state in the United States, as well as the first female director of the U.S. Mint
- Joseph K. Toole (1851-1929), the first Governor of Montana and member of the Democratic Party

== See also ==
- National Register of Historic Places listings in Andrew County, Missouri
