= Rosendale, Missouri =

City in Missouri, U.S.

- City
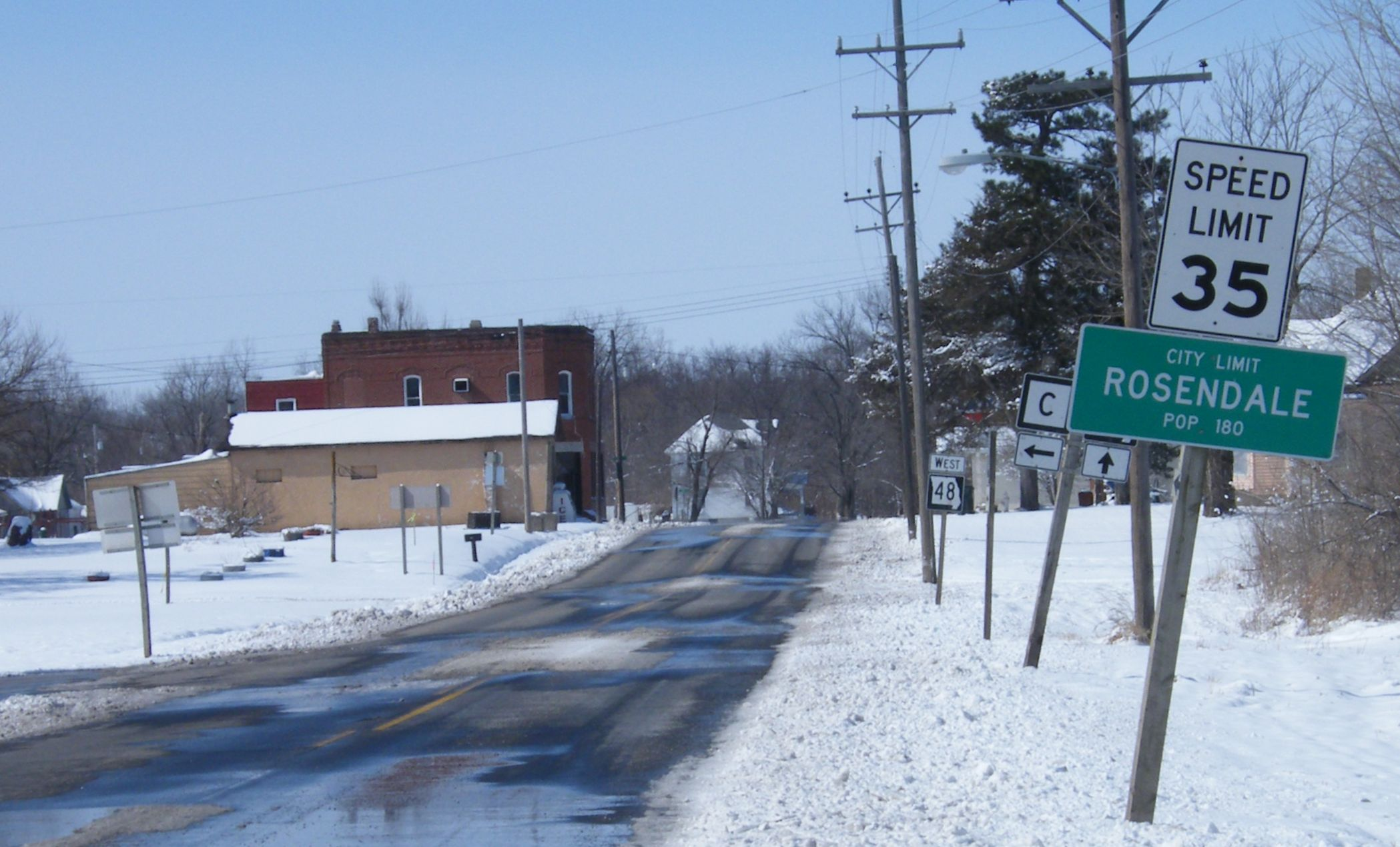
- Main Street in Rosendale, March 2009

- Location of Rosendale, Missouri
- Coordinates: 40°02′27″N 94°49′24″W
- Country: United States
- State: Missouri
- County: Andrew
- Township: Benton
- P.O. commissioned: 1869
- Incorporated: 1963

Area
  - Total: 0.31 sq mi (0.79 km^{2})
  - Land: 0.29 sq mi (0.76 km^{2})
  - Water: 0.012 sq mi (0.03 km^{2})
- Elevation: 919 ft (280 m)

Population (2020)
  - Total: 119
  - Density: 406.3/sq mi (156.86/km^{2})
- Time zone: UTC-6 (Central (CST))
  - Summer (DST): UTC-5 (CDT)
- ZIP code: 64483
- Area code: 816
- FIPS code: 29-63200
- GNIS feature ID: 2396434

Rosendale is a city in Benton Township, Andrew County, Missouri, United States. The population was 119 at the 2020 census.

Rosendale is part of the St. Joseph, MO–KS Metropolitan Statistical Area.

== History ==
A post office called Rosendale has been in operation since 1869. The city was named for the abundance of wild roses near the original town site.

== Geography ==
Rosendale is located on the east bank of the One Hundred and Two River.

According to the United States Census Bureau, the city has a total area of 0.30 square miles (0.78 km^{2}), of which 0.29 square miles (0.75 km^{2}) is land and 0.01 square miles (0.03 km^{2}) is water.

== Demographics ==
Historical population
Census	Pop.	Note	%±
1880	128		—
1890	288		125.0%
1900	448		55.6%
1910	359		−19.9%
1920	329		−8.4%
1930	322		−2.1%
1940	300		−6.8%
1950	245		−18.3%
1960	234		−4.5%
1970	245		4.7%
1980	223		−9.0%
1990	186		−16.6%
2000	180		−3.2%
2010	143		−20.6%
2020	119		−16.8%
U.S. Decennial Census

=== 2010 census ===
At the 2010 census there were 143 people in 50 households, including 38 families, in the city. The population density was 493.1 inhabitants per square mile (190.4/km^{2}). There were 74 housing units at an average density of 255.2 per square mile (98.5/km^{2}). The racial makup of the city was 98.6% White, 0.7% Native American, and 0.7% from other races. Hispanic or Latino of any race were 0.7%.

Of the 50 households, 38.0% had children under the age of 18 living with them, 62.0% were married couples living together, 12.0% had a female householder with no husband present, 2.0% had a male householder with no wife present, and 24.0% were non-families. 22.0% of households were one person, and 2% were one person aged 65 or older. The average household size was 2.86 and the average family size was 3.37.

The median age was 32.8 years. 31.5% of residents were under the age of 18; 8.4% were between the ages of 18 and 24; 23.8% were from 25 to 44; 24.5% were from 45 to 64; and 11.9% were 65 or older. The gender makeup of the city was 54.5% male and 45.5% female.

=== 2000 census ===
At the 2000 census there were 180 people in 69 households, including 50 families, in the city. The population density was 578.4 inhabitants per square mile (223.3/km^{2}). There were 76 housing units at an average density of 244.2 per square mile (94.3/km^{2}). The demographics of the city were 99.44% white, 0.56% Hispanic and 0.56% of two or more races.

Of the 69 households, 37.7% had children under the age of 18 living with them, 52.2% were married couples living together, 15.9% had a female householder with no husband present, and 27.5% were non-families. 18.8% of households were one person, and 5.8% were one person aged 65 or older. The average household size was 2.61 and the average family size was 3.06.

In the city the population was spread out, with 30.0% under the age of 18, 9.4% from 18 to 24, 30.6% from 25 to 44, 18.3% from 45 to 64, and 11.7% 65 or older. The median age was 31 years. For every 100 females, there were 97.8 males. For every 100 females age 18 and over, there were 103.2 males.

The median household income was $26,731 and the median family income was $30,313. Males had a median income of $25,179 versus $18,750 for females. The per capita income for the city was $12,847. About 10.2% of families and 11.9% of the population were below the poverty line, including 10.9% of those under the age of eighteen and 20.0% of those 65 or over.

== Education ==
It is in the North Andrew County R-VI School District.

== See also ==
- List of municipalities in Missouri
