= Savannah, Missouri =

City in Missouri, U.S.

- City
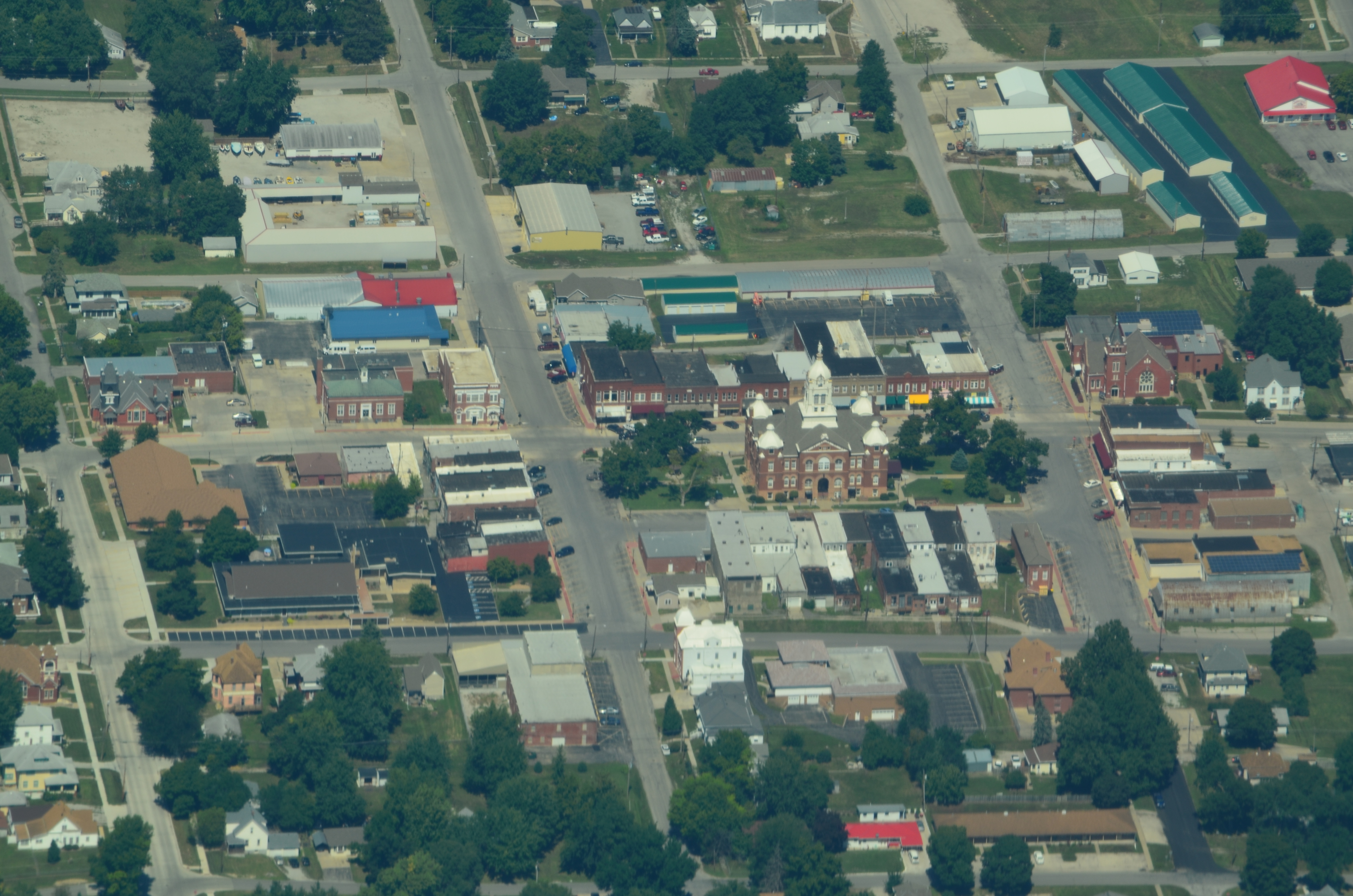
- Aerial view of Savannah, Missouri

- Location of Savannah, Missouri

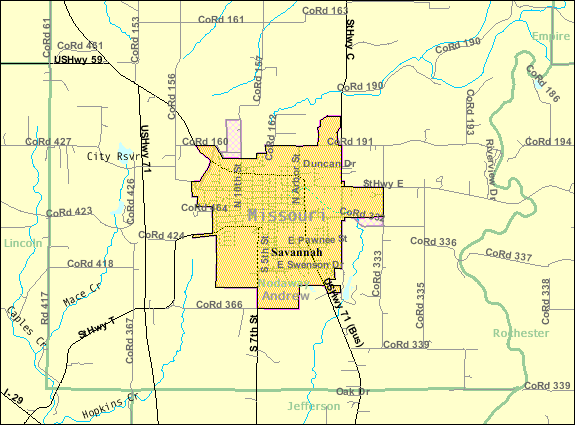
- Coordinates: 39°56′21″N 94°49′41″W
- Country: United States
- State: Missouri
- County: Andrew
- Township: Nodaway

Area
  - Total: 3.26 sq mi (8.45 km^{2})
  - Land: 3.25 sq mi (8.42 km^{2})
  - Water: 0.015 sq mi (0.04 km^{2})
- Elevation: 1,076 ft (328 m)

Population (2020)
  - Total: 5,069
  - Density: 1,559.7/sq mi (602.21/km^{2})
- Time zone: UTC-6 (Central (CST))
  - Summer (DST): UTC-5 (CDT)
- ZIP code: 64485
- Area codes: 816, 975
- FIPS code: 29-66044
- GNIS feature ID: 2396545
- Website: www.savannahmo.net

Savannah is a city in and the county seat of Andrew County, Missouri, United States. The population was 5,069 at the 2020 census. Savannah is part of the St. Joseph, Missouri Metropolitan Area.

== History ==
Savannah was founded in 1841 and incorporated in 1842. The city was named after Savannah Woods, the child of a first settler. A post office called Savannah has been in operation since 1841.

The Andrew County Courthouse was listed on the National Register of Historic Places in 1980.

== Geography ==
Savannah is located on Business 71 ten miles north of St Joseph. The One Hundred and Two River flows past two miles east of the city and the Happy Hollar Lake Conservation Area is three miles to the northeast.

According to the United States Census Bureau, the city has a total area of 3.15 square miles (8.16 km^{2}), of which 3.14 square miles (8.13 km^{2}) is land and 0.01 square miles (0.03 km^{2}) is water.

== Demographics ==
Historical population
Census	Pop.	Note	%±
1850	654		—
1860	822		25.7%
1870	1,257		52.9%
1880	1,206		−4.1%
1890	1,288		6.8%
1900	1,886		46.4%
1910	1,583		−16.1%
1920	1,831		15.7%
1930	1,888		3.1%
1940	2,108		11.7%
1950	2,332		10.6%
1960	2,455		5.3%
1970	3,324		35.4%
1980	4,184		25.9%
1990	4,352		4.0%
2000	4,762		9.4%
2010	5,057		6.2%
2020	5,069		0.2%
U.S. Decennial Census

=== 2020 census ===
As of the 2020 census, Savannah had a population of 5,069. The median age was 37.7 years. 25.9% of residents were under the age of 18 and 19.7% of residents were 65 years of age or older. For every 100 females there were 88.6 males, and for every 100 females age 18 and over there were 84.2 males age 18 and over.

100.0% of residents lived in urban areas, while 0.0% lived in rural areas.

There were 2,075 households in Savannah, of which 33.3% had children under the age of 18 living in them. Of all households, 43.8% were married-couple households, 16.4% were households with a male householder and no spouse or partner present, and 31.2% were households with a female householder and no spouse or partner present. About 32.6% of all households were made up of individuals and 16.8% had someone living alone who was 65 years of age or older.

There were 2,218 housing units, of which 6.4% were vacant. The homeowner vacancy rate was 2.4% and the rental vacancy rate was 6.1%.

Racial composition as of the 2020 census
Race	Number	Percent
White	4,708	92.9%
Black or African American	35	0.7%
American Indian and Alaska Native	15	0.3%
Asian	11	0.2%
Native Hawaiian and Other Pacific Islander	0	0.0%
Some other race	19	0.4%
Two or more races	281	5.5%
Hispanic or Latino (of any race)	114	2.2%

=== 2010 census ===
As of the census of 2010, there were 5,057 people, 2,043 households, and 1,327 families living in the city. The population density was 1,610.5 inhabitants per square mile (621.8/km^{2}). There were 2,187 housing units at an average density of 696.5 per square mile (268.9/km^{2}). The racial makeup of the city was 97.7% White, 0.4% African American, 0.3% Native American, 0.5% Asian, 0.3% from other races, and 0.8% from two or more races. Hispanic or Latino of any race were 1.6% of the population.

There were 2,043 households, of which 34.2% had children under the age of 18 living with them, 47.3% were married couples living together, 12.5% had a female householder with no husband present, 5.1% had a male householder with no wife present, and 35.0% were non-families. 30.4% of all households were made up of individuals, and 17% had someone living alone who was 65 years of age or older. The average household size was 2.41 and the average family size was 2.99.

The median age in the city was 38 years. 25.7% of residents were under the age of 18; 8.5% were between the ages of 18 and 24; 23.8% were from 25 to 44; 22.8% were from 45 to 64; and 19.1% were 65 years of age or older. The gender makeup of the city was 45.4% male and 54.6% female.

=== 2000 census ===
As of the census of 2000, there were 4,763 people, 1,927 households, and 1,266 families living in the city. The population density was 1,523.2 inhabitants per square mile (588.1/km^{2}). There were 2,038 housing units at an average density of 651.9 per square mile (251.7/km^{2}). The racial makeup of the city was 98.38% White, 0.29% African American, 0.38% Native American, 0.21% Asian, 0.25% from other races, and 0.48% from two or more races. Hispanic or Latino of any race were 0.59% of the population.

There were 1,927 households, out of which 32.1% had children under the age of 18 living with them, 51.8% were married couples living together, 10.9% had a female householder with no husband present, and 34.3% were non-families. 30.9% of all households were made up of individuals, and 17.5% had someone living alone who was 65 years of age or older. The average household size was 2.38 and the average family size was 2.99.

In the city, the population was spread out, with 25.5% under the age of 18, 8.6% from 18 to 24, 26.0% from 25 to 44, 19.4% from 45 to 64, and 20.6% who were 65 years of age or older. The median age was 38 years. For every 100 females, there were 81.7 males. For every 100 females age 18 and over, there were 77.2 males.

The median income for a household in the city was $32,996, and the median income for a family was $40,615. Males had a median income of $31,450 versus $20,851 for females. The per capita income for the city was $17,809. About 10.2% of families and 11.8% of the population were below the poverty line, including 17.6% of those under age 18 and 8.9% of those age 65 or over.

== Education ==
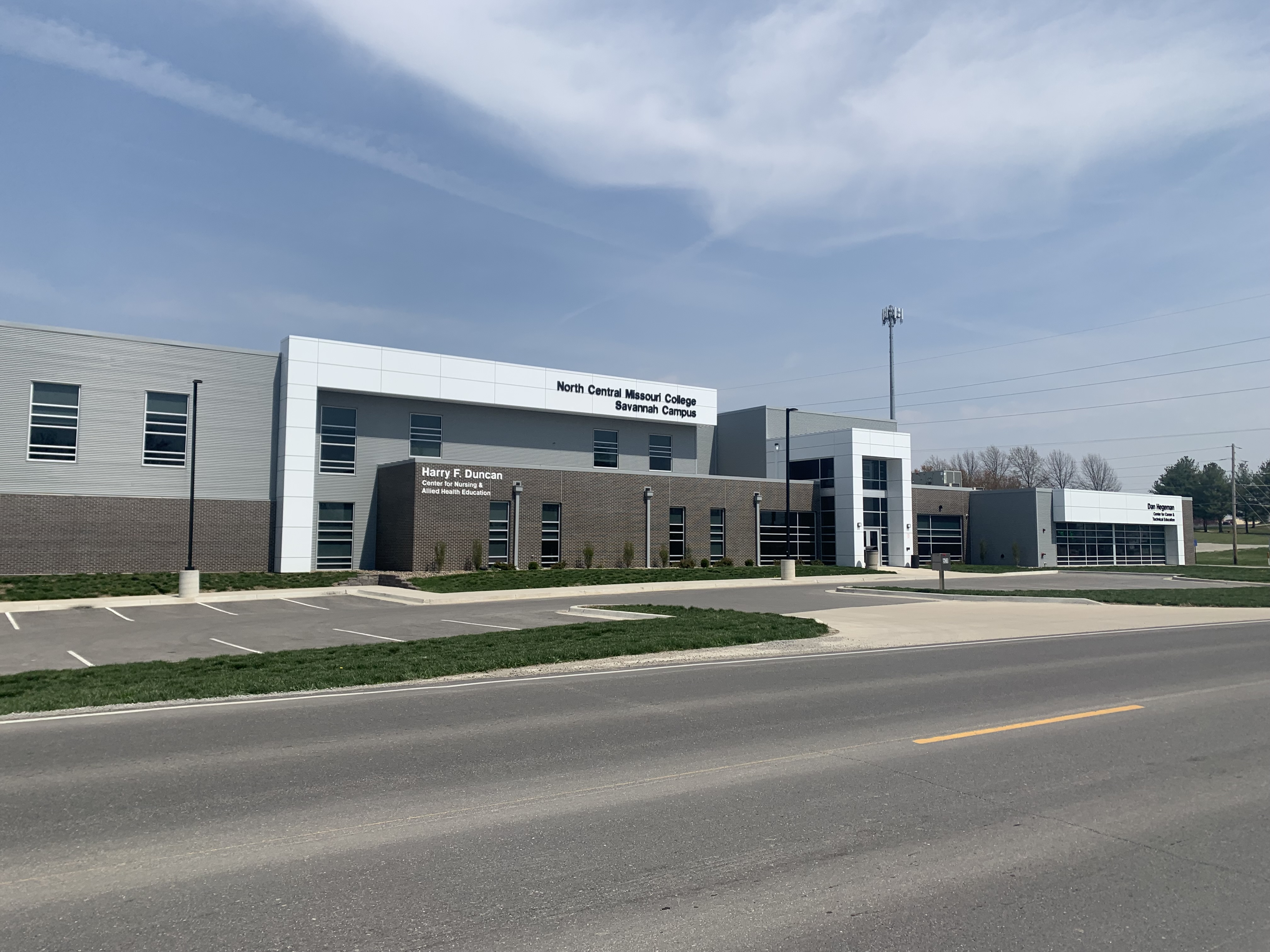
Savannah Campus of North Central Missouri College

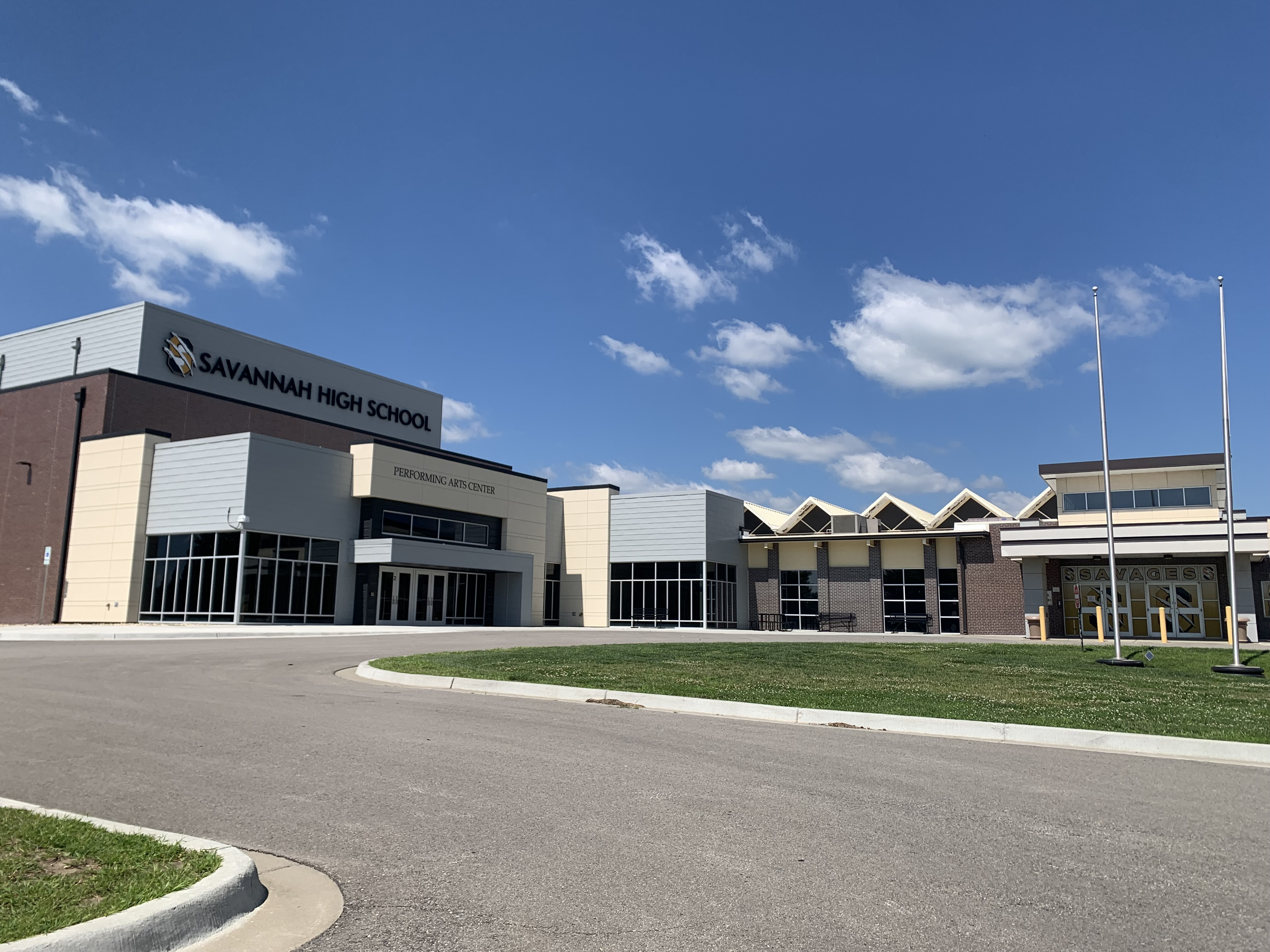
Savannah High School

Public education in Savannah is administered by Savannah R-III School District, which includes all of the municipality.

In 2022–2023, North Central Missouri College opened a satellite campus in Savannah.

Savannah has a public library, the Savannah Branch library.

== In popular culture ==
=== Books ===
Books that have Savannah, Missouri as either a major or minor plot setting:

Has It Come to This? The Mysterious, Unsolved Murder of Frank Richardson (2022) by Kimberly Tilley (true crime/non-fiction/American history)

== Notable people ==
- John Peter Altgeld – Governor of Illinois who lived in Savannah between 1869 and 1875
- Joseph Baldwin – "father of the Normal school"
- Charles Bruffy – Grammy Award winner
- Owen Bush – actor
- Harry Duncan – founded Little Tavern Shops
- Andrew J. Harlan – U.S. Representative from Indiana
- Elmer Holt – tenth Governor of Montana
- Joseph Toole – first and fourth Governor of Montana
- Carrie Stevens Walter – educator
- Eminem – rap artist (lived in public housing in the community)

== See also ==
- List of municipalities in Missouri
