= Fillmore, Missouri =

City in Andrew County, Missouri, United States

- City
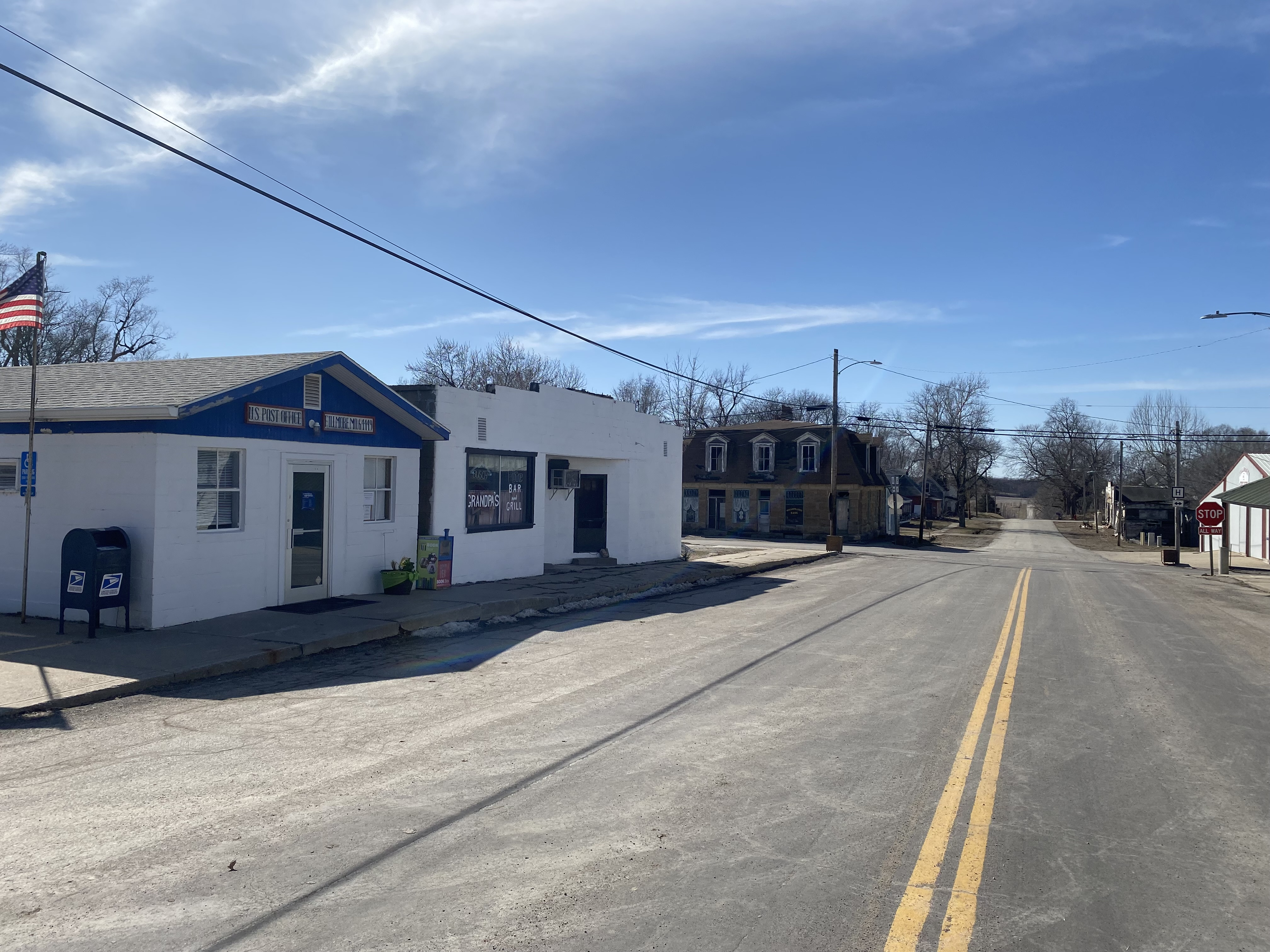
- Post office and store buildings in Filmore, March 2025

- Location of Fillmore, Missouri
- Coordinates: 40°01′31″N 94°58′23″W
- Country: United States
- State: Missouri
- County: Andrew
- Township: Jackson
- Platted: 1845
- Incorporated: 1873

Area
  - Total: 0.14 sq mi (0.36 km^{2})
  - Land: 0.14 sq mi (0.36 km^{2})
  - Water: 0 sq mi (0.00 km^{2})
- Elevation: 951 ft (290 m)

Population (2020)
  - Total: 173
  - Density: 1,242.1/sq mi (479.59/km^{2})
- Time zone: UTC-6 (Central (CST))
  - Summer (DST): UTC-5 (CDT)
- ZIP code: 64449
- Area code: 816
- FIPS code: 29-24184
- GNIS feature ID: 2394765
- Website: www.fillmoremo.com

Fillmore is a city in Jackson Township, Andrew County, Missouri, United States. The population was 173 at the 2020 census.

== History ==
Fillmore was laid out in 1845 and was named for Millard Fillmore, a statesman, and afterward 13th President of the United States. It was previously known as Newark. A post office called Fillmore has been in operation since 1851.

== Geography ==
According to the United States Census Bureau, the city has a total area of 0.14 square miles (0.36 km^{2}), all land.

== Demographics ==
Historical population
Census	Pop.	Note	%±
1860	322		—
1870	271		−15.8%
1880	297		9.6%
1890	261		−12.1%
1900	225		−13.8%
1910	232		3.1%
1920	272		17.2%
1930	308		13.2%
1940	269		−12.7%
1950	284		5.6%
1960	254		−10.6%
1970	251		−1.2%
1980	265		5.6%
1990	256		−3.4%
2000	211		−17.6%
2010	184		−12.8%
2020	173		−6.0%
U.S. Decennial Census

=== 2010 census ===
At the 2010 census there were 184 people in 70 households, including 50 families, in the city. The population density was 1,314.3 inhabitants per square mile (507.5/km^{2}). There were 89 housing units at an average density of 635.7 per square mile (245.4/km^{2}). The racial makup of the city was 98.4% White, 0.5% Native American, and 1.1% from two or more races. Of the 70 households 42.9% had children under the age of 18 living with them, 50.0% were married couples living together, 14.3% had a female householder with no husband present, 7.1% had a male householder with no wife present, and 28.6% were non-families. 24.3% of households were one person and 4.3% were one person aged 65 or older. The average household size was 2.63 and the average family size was 3.20.

The median age was 31.5 years. 34.2% of residents were under the age of 18; 7.1% were between the ages of 18 and 24; 26.6% were from 25 to 44; 23.8% were from 45 to 64; and 8.2% were 65 or older. The gender makeup of the city was 50.5% male and 49.5% female.

=== 2000 census ===
At the 2000 census there were 211 people in 83 households, including 52 families, in the city. The population density was 1,520.0 inhabitants per square mile (586.9/km^{2}). There were 94 housing units at an average density of 677.2 per square mile (261.5/km^{2}). The racial makup of the city was 98.58% White, 0.47% Native American and 0.95% Asian. Hispanic or Latino of any race were 0.47%.

Of the 83 households 37.3% had children under the age of 18 living with them, 51.8% were married couples living together, 6.0% had a female householder with no husband present, and 37.3% were non-families. 32.5% of households were one person and 12.0% were one person aged 65 or older. The average household size was 2.54 and the average family size was 3.29.

The age distribution was 31.8% under the age of 18, 10.0% from 18 to 24, 29.4% from 25 to 44, 18.0% from 45 to 64, and 10.9% 65 or older. The median age was 32 years. For every 100 females, there were 95.4 males. For every 100 females age 18 and over, there were 102.8 males.

The median household income was $31,750 and the median family income was $28,750. Males had a median income of $26,667 versus $22,917 for females. The per capita income for the city was $13,047. About 18.0% of families and 15.2% of the population were below the poverty line, including 23.3% of those under the age of eighteen and 4.5% of those sixty five or over.

== Education ==
It is in the North Andrew County R-VI School District.

== See also ==
- List of cities in Missouri
