= Missouri Route 48 =

State highway in Missouri, U.S.

Route 48
- Route 48 highlighted in orange

Route information
- Maintained by MoDOT
- Length: 20.128 mi (32.393 km)
- Existed: c. 1926–present

Major junctions
- West end: US 71 North of Savannah
- East end: US 169 / Route Z in King City

Location
- Country: United States
- State: Missouri
- Counties: Andrew, Gentry

Highway system
- Missouri State Highway System; Interstate; US; State; Supplemental
← Route 47	→ Route 49

Route 48 is a state highway in northwestern Missouri. Its western terminus is located at U.S. Route 71 (US 71) north of Savannah. The route travels eastward across the communities of Rosendale, Rea, and Whitesville. The road ends at US 169 in King City, about 20 miles (32 km) from its beginning. The road was designated around 1926, completely surfaced with gravel by 1936, and paved with asphalt by 1942.

The route is located in Andrew and Gentry counties. In 2015, Missouri Department of Transportation (MoDOT) calculated as many as 876 vehicles traveling on Route 48 east of US 71, and as few as 527 vehicles traveling west of Route B. This is expressed in terms of annual average daily traffic (AADT), a measure of traffic volume for any average day of the year.

== Route description ==
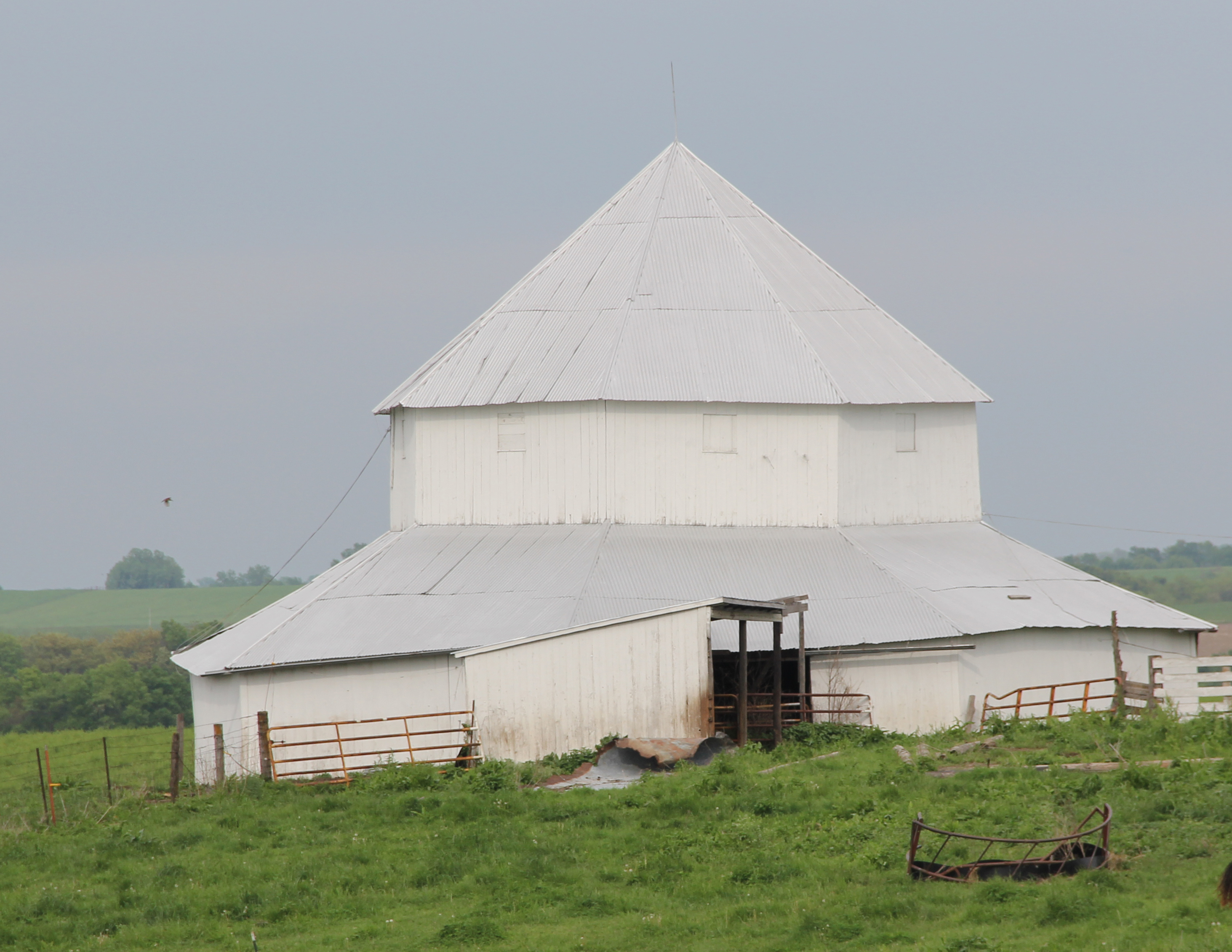
J. F. Roberts Octagonal Barn, located on Route 48

Route 48 starts at the intersection of US 71 and County Road 43 (CRD 43) and travels eastward. The road passes by a school and travels through farmland, and turns northeastward at CRD 146. East of CRD 149, the route shifts southward and crosses over the One Hundred and Two River, the city limit of Rosendale. Traversing the northern edge of the city as Main Street, the road intersects Route C, also known as Lake Street. The road soon leaves the town, and begins travelling northeastward again. At CRD 127, the route travels eastward, and enters Rea at CRD 117 as Byers Street. Route 48 intersects four city streets before leaving the city.

The entrance to the J. F. Roberts Octagonal Barn, listed on the National Register of Historic Places, is located past the intersection of Routes 48 and B. The road then intersects the northern terminus of Route D, and crosses over the Platte River. Route 48 intersects CRD 198 and CRD 201 at the unincorporated hamlet of Whitesville, and crosses the Agee Creek past CRD 91 and CRD 200. The road continues through farmland and crosses the Crooked Creek. Between CRD 226 and CRD 227, Route 48 intersects Routes M and P and shifts slightly southward. The road enters Gentry County past CRD 111 and CRD 235. Past CRD 417, the route crosses over the Elm Grove Branch, and the Third Fork after CRD 432. Route 48 enters King City as Empire Avenue, west of its intersection with Route CC. The road continues into the city, intersecting multiple city streets and driveways. The route ends at the intersection with US 169, also known as Connecticut Street inside the city. Route Z continues eastward and ends in Old Pattonsburg.

== History ==
The Route 48 designation first appeared on state maps in 1926, as an unimproved road starting from US 71 and ending at Route 4 in King City. A bridge at the One Hundred and Two River that carried the route was built in 1929, with a cost of $49,087. A large section of Route 4 was designated as US 169 in 1931, including Route 48's eastern terminus, and the Route 48 sections in Gentry County and from US 71 to Rosendale in Andrew Country were improved and had new gravel laid down; the paving costs were $101,176 (equivalent to $2,141,965 in 2025) and $150,282 (equivalent to $3,181,572 in 2025) respectively. About two years later, gravel was laid down from Whitesville to the Andrew–Gentry county line. The remaining section from Rosendale to Whitesville was laid down with gravel by 1936. The first asphalt paving on the route began in 1938, where the Gentry County section was paved first, with a cost of $38,861 (equivalent to $888,842 in 2025). The rest of the route was paved in asphalt four years later. Route 48 was resurfaced and shoulders were reshaped in 1974 from Rosendale to King City, which cost $435,278.46 (equivalent to $2,841,646 in 2025). The bridge at the One Hundred and Two River was replaced by a new bridge in October 2014.

== Major intersections ==
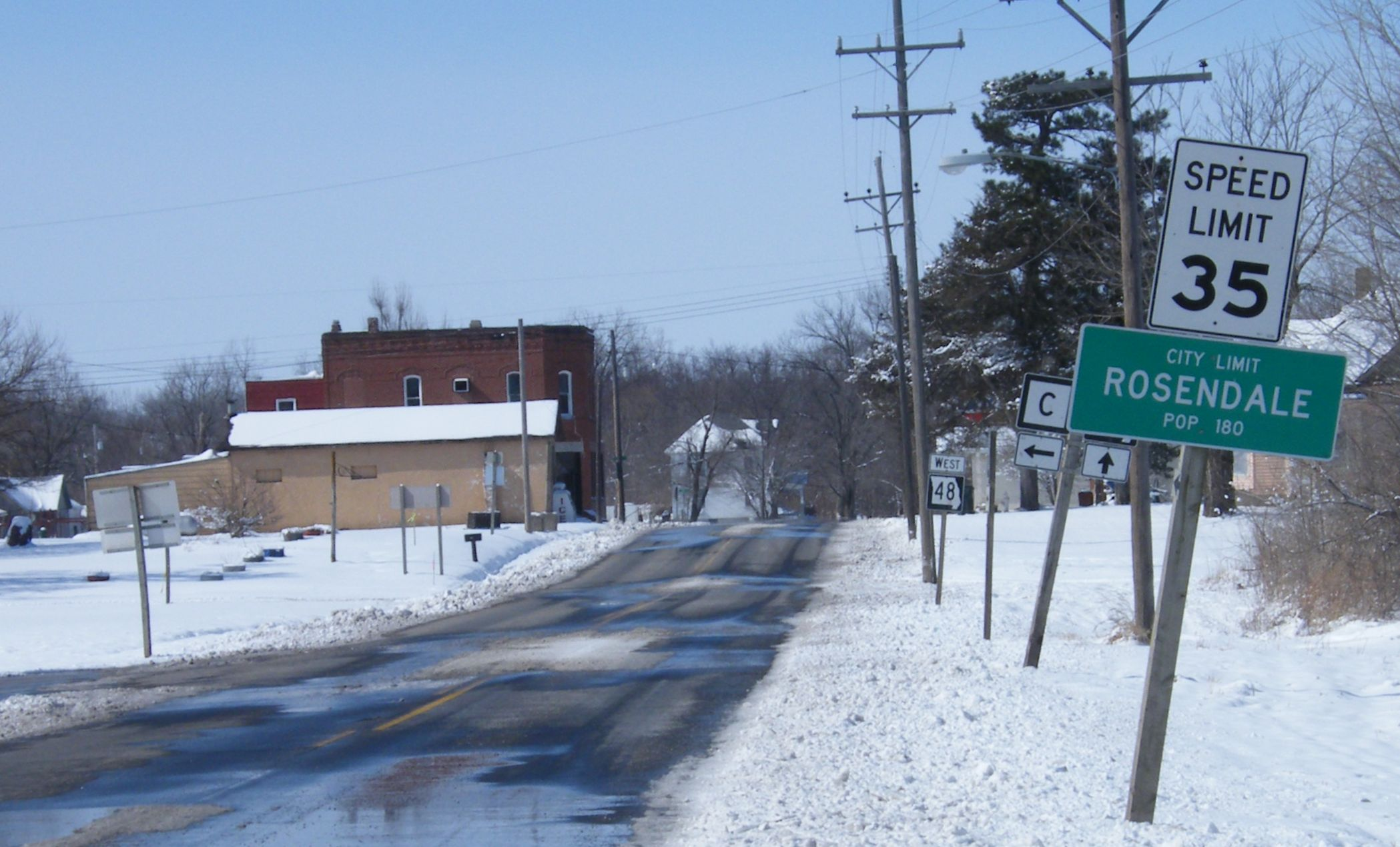
Routes 48 and C in Rosendale

County	Location	mi	km	Destinations	Notes
Andrew		0.000	0.000	US 71 – Savannah, Maryville	Western terminus
Andrew	Rosendale	3.437	5.531	Route C (Lake Street) – Savannah	Northern terminus of Route C
Andrew		8.028	12.920	Route B – Bolckow	Southern terminus of Route B
Andrew		8.517	13.707	Route D to US 169	Northern terminus of Route D
Andrew		13.930	22.418	Route M / Route P to US 169	Northern terminus of Route M; Southern terminus of Route P
Gentry	King City	19.294	31.051	Route CC	Southern terminus of Route CC
Gentry	King City	20.128	32.393	US 169 (Connecticut Street) / Route Z (Empire Avenue)	Eastern terminus; Western terminus of Route Z
1.000 mi = 1.609 km; 1.000 km = 0.621 mi
