= Jordan Creek (Little Third Fork tributary) =

Stream in northwest Missouri, U.S.

Location
- Country: United States
- State: Missouri
- County: Clinton and DeKalb

Physical characteristics
- Source
  - location: Lafayette Township, Clinton County
  - coordinates: 39°43′46″N 94°33′49″W
  - elevation: 980 ft (300 m)
- Mouth: Little Third Fork Platte River
  - location: Washington Township, DeKalb County
  - coordinates: 39°46′40″N 94°35′46″W
  - elevation: 863 ft (263 m)
- Length: 5.9 mi (9.5 km)

Basin features
- Progression: Jordan Creek → Little Third Fork → Third Fork Platte River → Platte River → Missouri River → Mississippi River → Atlantic Ocean

Jordan Creek is a stream in Clinton and DeKalb county in the U.S. state of Missouri. It is an indirect tributary of the Third Fork Platte River via the Little Third Fork, and is 5.9 miles (9.5 km) long.

The stream headwaters arise in the northwest corner of Clinton County approximately one mile northwest of the community of Hemple at 39°44′00″N 94°34′36″W. The stream flows northwest into DeKalb County and turns north crossing under U.S. Route 36. It continues north to its confluence with the Third Fork. The confluence is south of the community of Bayfield and approximately one-quarter mile east of the Dekalb-Buchanan county line.

The name may be a transfer from the Jordan River in West Asia.

== See also ==
- Tributaries of the Third Fork Platte River
- List of rivers of Missouri
