= Crooked Creek (Platte River tributary) =

Stream in northwest Missouri, U.S.

Location
- Country: United States
- State: Missouri
- County: Andrew

Physical characteristics
- Source
  - location: Platte Township, Andrew County
  - coordinates: 40°05′14″N 94°38′43″W
  - elevation: 1,050 ft (320 m)
- Mouth: Platte River
  - location: Empire Township, Andrew County
  - coordinates: 40°00′44″N 94°41′24″W
  - elevation: 892 ft (272 m)
- Length: 7.2 mi (11.6 km)

Basin features
- Progression: Crooked Creek → Platte River → Missouri River → Mississippi River → Atlantic Ocean

Crooked Creek is a stream in Andrew County in the U.S. state of Missouri. It is a tributary of the Platte River and is 7.2 miles (11.6 km) long.

The stream begins in eastern Platte Township, northeast of Whitesville and travels a southwesterly course for its entire length. It crosses Route 48 about halfway along its length, and flows into the Platte River in central Empire Prairie Township east of Happy Holler Conservation Area.

The former hamlet of Flag Springs was settled along the southeastern bank of the stream.

== See also ==
- Tributaries of the Platte River
- List of rivers of Missouri
