= Agee Creek (Platte River tributary) =

Stream in Missouri, U.S.

Location
- Country: United States
- State: Missouri
- County: Andrew

Physical characteristics
- Source
  - location: Platte Township, Andrew County
  - coordinates: 40°05′58″N 94°39′56″W
  - elevation: 1,020 ft (310 m)
- Mouth: Platte River
  - location: Empire Township, Andrew County
  - coordinates: 40°02′18″N 94°43′21″W
  - elevation: 906 ft (276 m)
- Length: 6.8 mi (10.9 km)

Basin features
- Progression: Agee Creek → Platte River → Missouri River → Mississippi River → Atlantic Ocean

Agee Creek is a stream in Andrew County in the U.S. state of Missouri. It is a tributary of the Platte River and is 6.8 miles (10.9 km) long.

The stream begins in north-central Platte Township, northeast of Whitesville and travels a southwesterly course for its entire length. It crosses Route 48 about halfway along its length, and flows into the Platte River in the northern reaches of Empire Prairie Township just northeast of Happy Holler Conservation Area.

== See also ==
- Tributaries of the Platte River
- List of rivers of Missouri
