= Third Fork Platte River =

Stream in Missouri, U.S.

Location
- Country: United States
- State: Missouri
- County: Buchanan, Clinton, DeKalb, and Gentry

Physical characteristics
- Source
  - location: Platte Township
  - coordinates: 40°06′11″N 94°38′38″W
  - elevation: 1,050 ft (320 m)
- Mouth: Platte River
  - location: Marion Township
  - coordinates: 39°42′37″N 94°41′53″W
  - elevation: 837 ft (255 m)
- Length: 41.8 mi (67.3 km)
- Width
  - maximum: 28.4 feet (8.7 m)
- Depth
  - maximum: 4.4 feet (1.3 m)

Basin features
- Progression: Third Fork Platte River → Platte River → Missouri River → Mississippi River → Atlantic Ocean
- Tributaries
  - left: Little Third Fork Platte River

Third Fork Platte River is a stream in the northwest portion of the State of Missouri. It is a major tributary of the Platte River and is 41.8 miles (67.3 km) long, making it the fourth longest tributary of the Platte River.

== History ==
From September 2005 to March 2006, the Third Fork Platte River underwent a "Biological Assessment Study" by the Missouri Department of Natural Resources. The purpose was to study the macroinvertebrate community. Six sampling stations were deployed over a 20 miles (32 km) portion of the stream. The assessed habitats were deemed partially or fully sustainable.

== Geography ==
=== Course ===
The Third Fork Platte River headwaters in northeast Andrew County and flows east into Gentry County, then south past King City. Then the stream continues southerly to the east of Union Star and along the west side of DeKalb County; it turns southwest and is joined by Little Third Fork in northeast Buchanan County. It passes to the northwest of Easton and afterwards deposits into the Platte River northeast of Agency.

=== Hydrology ===
Third Fork Platte River is a seventh order stream, making it the highest order tributary of the Platte River. The stream was originally 53.1 miles (85.5 km) long before its channelization, in which 18.5 miles (29.8 km) was channelized. One winter measurement recorded the stream's maximum depth at 4.4 feet (1.3 m) and its width 28.4 feet (8.7 m).

=== Communities ===
Union Star is the largest town fully within the Third Fork watershed, being situated at the mouth of Bull Creek. King City is on the ridge between the Third Fork and Grand River watershed. The smaller communities of Clarksdale, Easton and Helena also lie within the watershed.

=== Tributaries ===
There are 11 named direct and indirect tributaries of the Third Fork Platte River: Raynolds Branch, James Branch, Becks Branch, Muddy Creek, Little Third Fork, Jordan Creek, Morgan Branch, Bays Branch, Crooked Creek, Bull Creek, and Elm Grove Branch.

=== Crossings ===
There are 7 highways that cross the Third Fork Platte River: U.S Highway 36, U.S Highway 169, Route 6, Route 48, Route BB, Route P, and Route V.

== See also ==
- Tributaries of the Platte River
- List of rivers of Missouri
