= Morgan Branch =

Morgan Branch may refer to:

- Morgan Branch (Little Third Fork), a stream in Missouri
- Morgan Branch (North Wyaconda River), a stream in Missouri
