= McGuire Branch =

Stream in northwest Missouri, U.S.

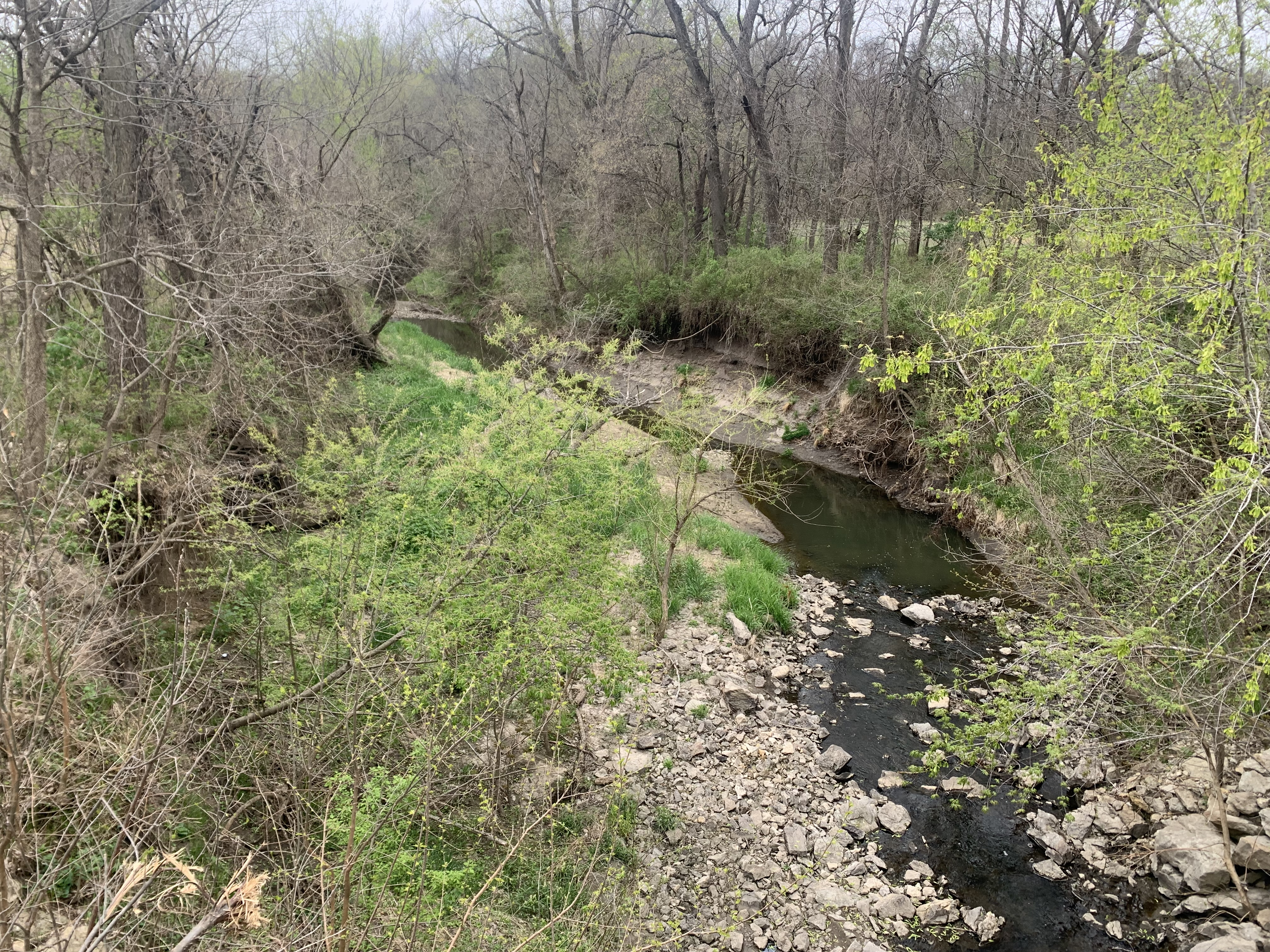
- McGuire Branch at Missouri Route NN bridge south of Hemple, Missouri

Location
- Country: United States
- State: Missouri
- County: Clinton

Physical characteristics
- Source
  - location: Lafayette Township, Clinton County
  - coordinates: 39°44′31″N 94°32′11″W
  - elevation: 980 ft (300 m)
- Mouth: Castile Creek
  - location: Atchison Township, Clinton County
  - coordinates: 39°38′09″N 94°31′32″W
  - elevation: 883 ft (269 m)
- Length: 9.9 mi (15.9 km)

Basin features
- Progression: McGuire Branch → Castile Creek → Platte River → Missouri River → Mississippi River → Atlantic Ocean

McGuire Branch is a stream in western Clinton County in the State of Missouri. It is an indirect tributary of the Platte River via Castile Creek and is 9.9 miles long.

McGuire Branch has the name of Silas McGuire, an early citizen. There is one named tributary of this stream called Roger Branch.

== See also ==
- Tributaries of Castile Creek
- List of rivers of Missouri
