= Jowler Creek =

Stream in Missouri, U.S.

Location
- Country: United States
- State: Missouri
- County: Platte

Physical characteristics
- Source
  - location: Green Township, Platte County
  - coordinates: 39°29′54″N 94°44′51″W
  - elevation: 950 ft (290 m)
- Mouth: Platte River
  - location: Carroll Township, Platte County
  - coordinates: 39°25′32″N 94°45′01″W
  - elevation: 801 ft (244 m)
- Length: 10.5 mi (16.9 km)

Basin features
- Progression: Jowler Creek → Platte River → Missouri River → Mississippi River → Atlantic Ocean

Jowler Creek is a stream in Platte County in the U.S. state of Missouri. It is a tributary of the Platte River and is 10.5 miles (16.9 km) long.

Jowler Creek most likely was named after a local citizen, although tradition states the name was selected on account of pork jowls being discharged into the creek as slaughter waste.

== See also ==
- Tributaries of the Platte River
- List of rivers of Missouri
