= West Platte River =

Stream in Iowa, U.S.

Location
- Country: United States
- State: Iowa
- County: Union and Adams

Physical characteristics
- Source
  - location: Spaulding Township, Union County
  - coordinates: 41°04′52″N 94°26′22″W
  - elevation: 1,300 ft (400 m)
- Mouth: Platte River
  - location: Grant Township, Adams County
  - coordinates: 40°58′45″N 94°29′40″W
  - elevation: 1,178 ft (359 m)
- Length: 10.6 mi (17.1 km)

Basin features
- Progression: West Platte River → Platte River → Missouri River → Mississippi River → Atlantic Ocean

West Platte River is a stream in Union and Adams counties in the U.S. state of Iowa. It is a tributary of the Platte River and is 10.6 miles (17.1 km) long.

The stream headwaters in northwestern Union County, west of Creston and flows southwest towards Cromwell. Then, it travels west and crosses into Adams County where it then turns and flows into the Platte River just north of US 34.

== See also ==
- Tributaries of the Platte River
- List of rivers of Iowa
