= Little Third Fork Platte River =

Stream in Missouri, U.S.

Little Third Fork Platte River Livingston Creek

Location
- Country: United States
- State: Missouri
- County: Gentry, DeKalb, and Buchanan

Physical characteristics
- Source
  - location: King City, Jackson Township, Gentry County
  - coordinates: 40°03′01″N 94°31′13″W
  - elevation: 1,050 ft (320 m)
- Mouth: Third Fork Platte River
  - location: Marion Township, Buchanan County
  - coordinates: 39°46′15″N 94°38′06″W
  - elevation: 850 ft (260 m)
- Length: 30.9 mi (49.7 km)

Basin features
- Progression: Little Third Fork → Third Fork Platte River → Platte River → Missouri River → Mississippi River → Atlantic Ocean
- Stream gradient 7.8 ft/mi (1.48 m/km)

Little Third Fork Platte River is a stream in Gentry, DeKalb, and Buchanan counties in the U.S. state of Missouri. It is a tributary of the Third Fork Platte River and is 30.9 miles (49.7 km) long.

== History ==
The Little Third Fork of the Platte River was a notable stream at the settlement of DeKalb County, having pleasant, alluvial soil near its banks. This stream has also been denoted as Livingston Creek.

== Geography ==
=== Course ===
The stream begins in the southwest of Gentry County in King City and flows southerly through DeKalb County past Clarksdale. Afterwards, it curves southwest and joins the Third Fork Platte River in the northeast of Buchanan County about 2 miles (3.2 km) north of Easton.

=== Hydrology ===
Third Fork Platte River is a sixth order stream, making it the tied second-highest order tributary of the Platte River. The stream was originally 38.2 miles (61.5 km) long before its channelization, in which 11.3 miles (18.2 km) was channelized.

=== Communities ===
Clarksdale is the largest town fully within the Little Third Fork watershed, being situated on its northwestern bank. King City is on the ridge between the Third Fork, Little Third Fork, and Grand River watershed.

The extinct communities of Bayfield and Oak in DeKalb County were both in this watershed.

=== Tributaries ===
There are two named direct tributaries of the Little Third Fork Platte River, Jordan Creek and Morgan Branch.

=== Crossings ===
There are four highways that cross the Little Third Fork Platte River: Route 6, Route 31, Route E, Route O.

=== Miscellaneous ===
Many wind turbines of the Lost Creek Wind Farm are located around the northern half of the Little Third Fork Platte River.

== See also ==
- Tributaries of Third Fork Platte River
- List of rivers of Missouri
