= Holland Branch =

Stream in Missouri, U.S.

Location
- Country: United States
- State: Missouri
- County: Platte

Physical characteristics
- Source
  - location: Green Township, Platte County
  - coordinates: 39°28′50″N 94°43′13″W
  - elevation: 950 ft (290 m)
- Mouth: Platte River
  - location: Green Township, Platte County
  - coordinates: 39°30′14″N 94°40′36″W
  - elevation: 784 ft (239 m)
- Length: 5.8 mi (9.3 km)

Basin features
- Progression: Holland Branch → Platte River → Missouri River → Mississippi River → Atlantic Ocean

Holland Branch is a stream in Platte County in the U.S. state of Missouri. It is a tributary of the Platte River and is 5.8 miles (9.3 km) long.

Holland Branch has the name of John Holland, the original owner of the site. There is one named tributary of this stream which is Chestnut Branch.

== See also ==
- Tributaries of the Platte River
- List of rivers of Missouri
