= Prairie Creek (Platte River tributary) =

Stream in northwest Missouri, U.S.

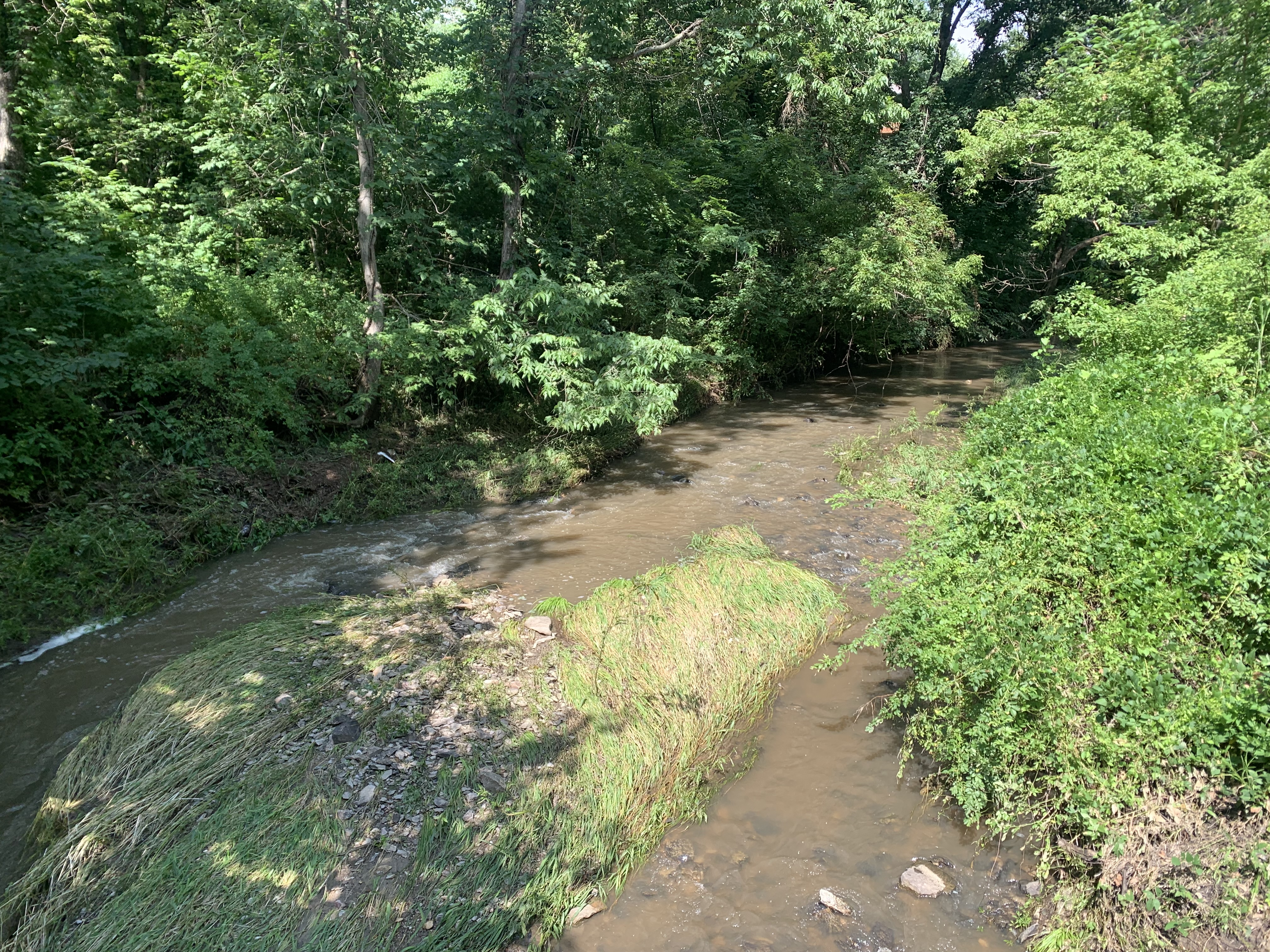
- Prairie Creek at Prairie Creek Greenway bridge in Platte City

Location
- Country: United States
- State: Missouri
- County: Platte

Physical characteristics
- Source
  - location: Carroll Township, Platte County
  - coordinates: 39°18′50″N 94°43′50″W
  - elevation: 950 ft (290 m)
- Mouth: Platte River
  - location: Carroll Township, Platte County
  - coordinates: 39°18′26″N 94°47′59″W
  - elevation: 741 ft (226 m)
- Length: 8.1 mi (13.0 km)

Basin features
- Progression: Prairie Creek → Platte River → Missouri River → Mississippi River → Atlantic Ocean

Prairie Creek is a stream in Platte County in the U.S. state of Missouri It is a tributary of the Platte River and is 8.1 miles (13.0 km) long.

There are three named direct and indirect tributaries of this stream: Sand Branch, Fox Creek, and Big Creek.

Prairie Creek was so named on account of a prairie near its headwaters.

== See also ==
- Tributaries of the Platte River
- List of rivers of Missouri
