= Saylings Creek =

Stream in Iowa, U.S.

Location
- Country: United States
- State: Iowa
- County: Adams

Physical characteristics
- Source
  - location: Grant Township, Adams County
  - coordinates: 40°55′29″N 94°35′01″W
  - elevation: 1,250 ft (380 m)
- Mouth: Platte River
  - location: Grant Township, Adams County
  - coordinates: 40°56′59″N 94°29′38″W
  - elevation: 1,168 ft (356 m)
- Length: 9.3 mi (15.0 km)

Basin features
- Progression: Saylings Creek → Platte River → Missouri River → Mississippi River → Atlantic Ocean

Saylings Creek is a stream in Adams County in the U.S. state of Iowa. It is a tributary of the Platte River and is 9.3 miles (15.0 km) long.

There is one named tributary called Metz Creek.

== See also ==
- Tributaries of the Platte River
- List of rivers of Iowa
