= Sand Branch =

Sand Branch may refer to:

- Sand Branch, Dallas County, Texas, an unincorporated community
- Sand Branch (Prairie Creek tributary), a stream in Missouri
