= Opera Hall Block =

Opera Hall Block may refer to:

- Opera Hall Block (King City, Missouri), listed on the National Register of Historic Places in Gentry County, Missouri
- Opera Hall Block (Hudson, Wisconsin), listed on the National Register of Historic Places in St. Croix County, Wisconsin
