= Starfield, Missouri =

Extinct community in Missouri, U.S.

Coordinates: 39°38′43″N 94°31′04″W

Starfield is an extinct hamlet in Lafayette Township in western Clinton County, in the U.S. state of Missouri. The community is on Missouri Route K and Castile Creek. The city of Gower is 4.5 miles to the southwest and Plattsburg is 6.5 miles to the southeast. Northwest Starfield Road bears its namesake.

== History ==
The Starfield post office closed in 1914. The origin of the name Starfield is uncertain.
