= Clear Branch (Platte River tributary) =

Stream in northwest Missouri, U.S.

Location
- Country: United States
- State: Missouri
- County: Platte

Physical characteristics
- Source
  - location: Carroll Township, Platte County
  - coordinates: 39°21′22″N 94°42′04″W
  - elevation: 950 ft (290 m)
- Mouth: Platte River
  - location: Carroll Township, Platte County
  - coordinates: 39°22′51″N 94°44′50″W
  - elevation: 758 ft (231 m)
- Length: 3.5 mi (5.6 km)

Basin features
- Progression: Clear Branch → Platte River → Missouri River → Mississippi River → Atlantic Ocean

Clear Branch is a stream in Platte County in the U.S. state of Missouri. It is a tributary of the Platte River and is 3.5 miles (5.6 km) long.

Clear Branch was so named on account of its clear water. Clear Branch begins a few miles east of Platte City and flows northwesterly towards Platte Falls Conservation Area and deposits into the Platte River after flowing through a few ponds.

== See also ==
- Tributaries of the Platte River
- List of rivers of Missouri
