= Crooked Creek (Third Fork tributary) =

Stream in northwest Missouri, U.S.

Location
- Country: United States
- State: Missouri
- County: DeKalb

Physical characteristics
- Source
  - location: Polk Township, DeKalb County
  - coordinates: 39°59′44″N 94°31′49″W
  - elevation: 1,050 ft (320 m)
- Mouth: Third Fork Platte River
  - location: Sherman Township, DeKalb County
  - coordinates: 39°55′33″N 94°35′28″W
  - elevation: 919 ft (280 m)
- Length: 7.2 mi (11.6 km)

Basin features
- Progression: Crooked Creek → Third Fork Platte River → Platte River → Missouri River → Mississippi River → Atlantic Ocean

Crooked Creek is a stream in western DeKalb County in the U.S. state of Missouri. It is a tributary of the Third Fork Platte River and is 7.2 miles long.

Crooked Creek most likely was named for its meandering course.

== See also ==
- Tributaries of the Third Fork Platte River
- List of rivers of Missouri
