= Morgan Branch (Little Third Fork tributary) =

Stream in northwest Missouri, U.S.

Location
- Country: United States
- State: Missouri
- County: DeKalb

Physical characteristics
- Source
  - location: Sherman Township, DeKalb County
  - coordinates: 39°55′08″N 94°33′13″W
  - elevation: 1,020 ft (310 m)
- Mouth: Little Third Fork Platte River
  - location: Sherman Township, DeKalb County
  - coordinates: 39°50′43″N 94°31′04″W
  - elevation: 906 ft (276 m)
- Length: 7.8 mi (12.6 km)

Basin features
- Progression: Morgan Branch → Little Third Fork → Third Fork Platte River → Platte River → Missouri River → Mississippi River → Atlantic Ocean

Morgan Branch is a stream in DeKalb County in the U.S. state of Missouri. It is an indirect tributary of the Third Fork Platte River via the Little Third Fork, and is 7.8 miles (12.6 km) long.

Morgan Branch was named after William Morgan, the original owner of the site.

== See also ==
- Tributaries of the Third Fork Platte River
- List of rivers of Missouri
