= Big Pump =

United States historic place in Maryville, Missouri

- Formerly listed on the U.S. National Register of Historic Places
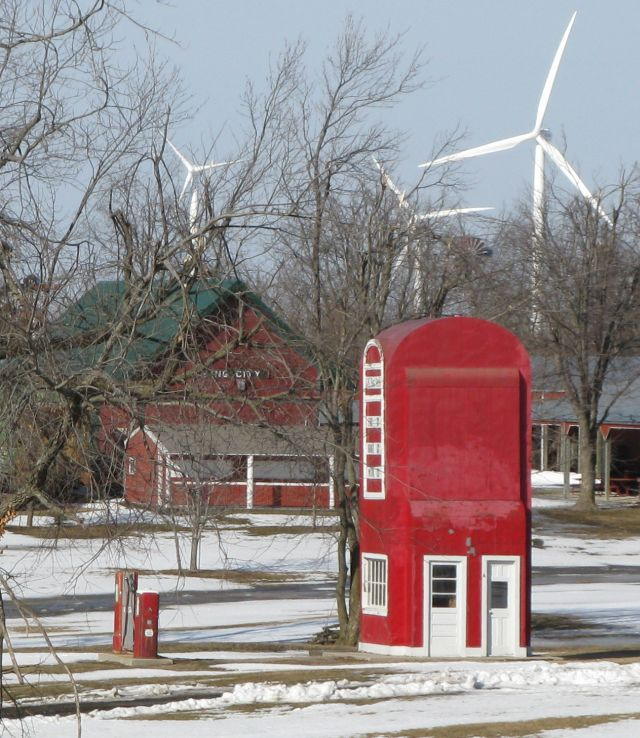
- The Big Pump, originally located in Maryville, now in King City.

- Location within Missouri Location within the United States
- Location: 903 S. Main St., Maryville, Missouri
- Coordinates: 40°20′7″N 94°52′23″W
- Area: less than one acre
- Built: 1937
- Built by: Foster, H.L. & Co.
- Architectural style: Art Deco
- NRHP reference No.: 80002384

Significant dates
- Added to NRHP: September 18, 1980
- Removed from NRHP: December 19, 1994

Big Pump, also known as Maryville Oil Co., was a historic service station located at Maryville, Nodaway County, Missouri. It was built in 1937, and was a 21-foot high, Art Deco style structure. It had wood framing and sheet metal siding shaped to resemble a gasoline pump of the 1937 period.

It was listed on the National Register of Historic Places in 1980. It was delisted in 1994 after being relocated to King City.
