= Castile Creek =

Stream in Missouri, U.S.

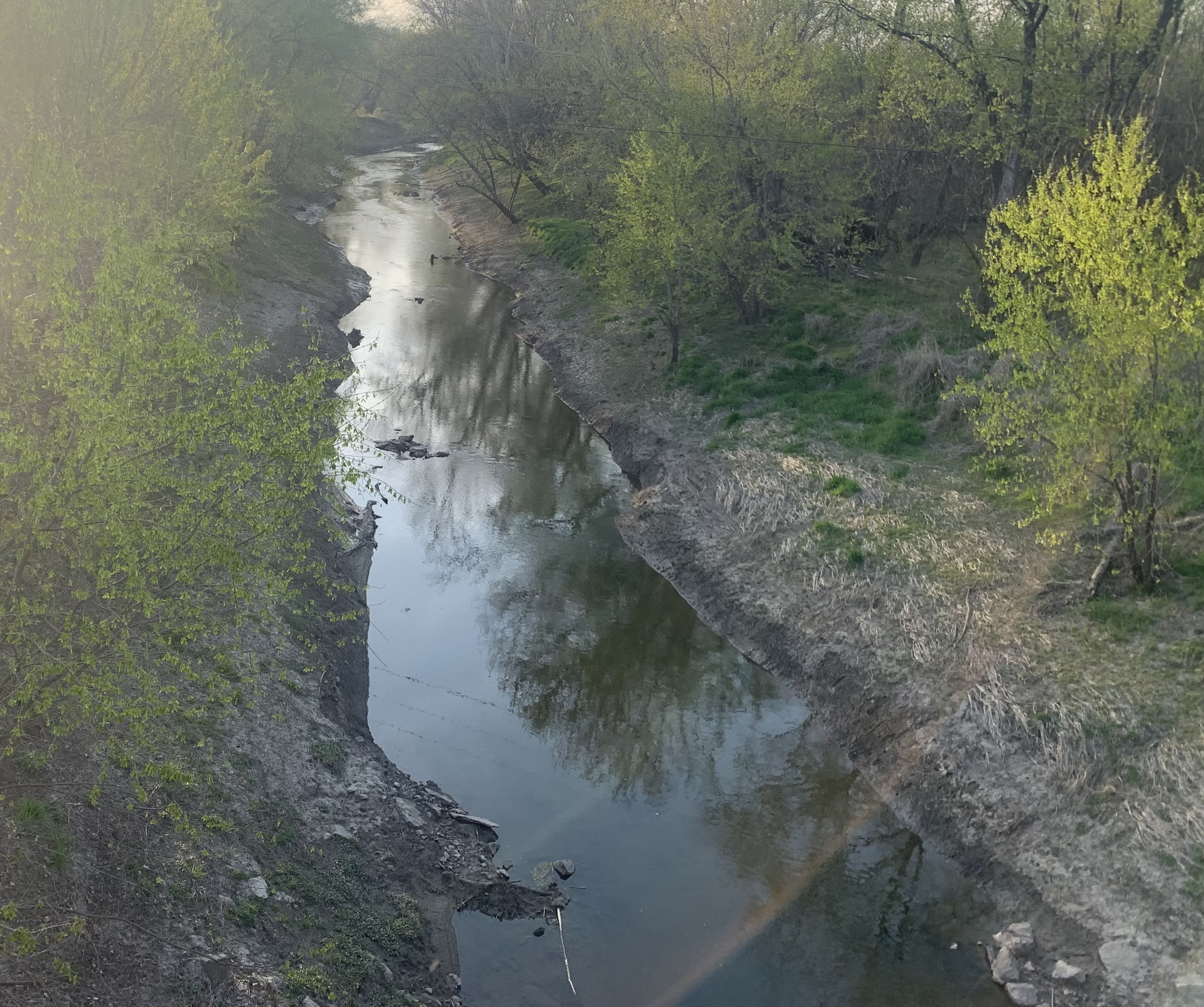
- Castile Creek on Route 116 bridge in Buchanan County

Location
- Country: United States
- State: Missouri
- County: Buchanan, Clinton, and Dekalb

Physical characteristics
- Source
  - location: Camden Township
  - coordinates: 39°52′42″N 94°26′37″W
  - elevation: 1,020 ft (310 m)
- Mouth: Platte River
  - location: Platte Township
  - coordinates: 39°32′54″N 94°39′42″W
  - elevation: 810 ft (250 m)
- Length: 45.3 mi (72.9 km)

Basin features
- Progression: Castile Creek → Platte River → Missouri River → Mississippi River → Atlantic Ocean
- Stream gradient 5.4 ft/mi (1.02 m/km)

Castile Creek is a stream in the northwest portion of the State of Missouri. It is a major tributary of the Platte River and is 45.3 miles (72.9 km) long, which makes it the third longest tributary of the Platte River.

== Etymology ==
Castile Creek has the name of William Castile, a pioneer citizen. It was also known as Castile's Creek.

== Course ==
Castile Creek headwaters just northwest of Amity in DeKalb County and flows southwesterly under US 36 about 9 miles before passing Stewartsville and entering Clinton County. The stream continues south-southwest over 7 miles before adjusting to a more westerly bearing around Starfield. The stream passes south of Gower as it crosses into Buchanan County before depositing into the Platte River just north of the Platte County border. It is joined by its principal tributary, Malden Creek, shortly before its mouth.

== Communities ==
The municipalities of Amity and Stewartsville lie along the Castile Creek, and two others, Gower and Hemple, lie within its watershed. The extinct hamlet of Ridgeville was perched on the eastern reaches of the stream's arms.

== Crossings ==
Three major highways cross Castile Creek, the two U.S. Highways are US 36 and US 169, with the state highway being Route 116.

== Tributaries ==
There are 7 named direct and indirect tributaries of Castile Creek. The two that deposit in Clinton County are: McGuire Branch and Roger Branch, and the five whose mouths are in Buchanan County are: Jenkins Branch, Malden Creek, Frazier Branch, Crabapple Branch, Wolfpen Creek.

== See also ==
- Tributaries of the Platte River
- List of rivers of Missouri
