= Marion Township, Buchanan County, Missouri =

Township in Buchanan County, Missouri, U.S.

Marion Township
- Township
- Coordinates: 39°46′07″N 94°40′21″W
- Country: United States
- State: Missouri
- County: Buchanan

Area
  - Total: 49.85 sq mi (129.1 km^{2})
  - Land: 49.25 sq mi (127.6 km^{2})
  - Water: 0.6 sq mi (1.6 km^{2}) 1.2%
- Elevation: 860 ft (260 m)

Population (2020)
  - Total: 1,159
  - Density: 23.5/sq mi (9.1/km^{2})
- FIPS code: 29-02145938
- GNIS feature ID: 766342

Marion Township is a township in Buchanan County, Missouri, United States. At the 2020 census, its population was 1159.

Marion Township was established in 1837.

== Geography ==
Marion Township covers an area of 48.26 square miles (125.0 km^{2}) and contains one incorporated settlement, Easton. It contains eight cemeteries: Blakely, Bowen, Courtney, Kessler, Minor, Moxley, Saint Joseph's, and Saint Mary's.

The streams of One Hundred and Two River, Becks Branch, James Branch, Third Fork Platte River, Little Third Fork, and Muddy Creek run through this township.

== Transportation ==
The following highways travel through the township:

- U.S. Route 36
- Route 6
- Route 31
- Route AB
- Route C
- Route N
- Route P
- Route UU
- Route Z
