= Middle Platte River =

Stream in Iowa, U.S.

Location
- Country: United States
- State: Iowa
- County: Union and Ringgold

Physical characteristics
- Source
  - location: Lincoln Township, Union County
  - coordinates: 41°05′19″N 94°20′09″W
  - elevation: 1,310 ft (400 m)
- Mouth: Platte River
  - location: Lincoln Township, Ringgold County
  - coordinates: 40°53′00″N 94°26′06″W
  - elevation: 1,125 ft (343 m)
- Length: 20.8 mi (33.5 km)

Basin features
- Progression: Middle Platte River → Platte River → Missouri River → Mississippi River → Atlantic Ocean

Middle Platte River is a stream in Union and Ringgold counties in the U.S. state of Iowa. It is a tributary of the Platte River and is 20.8 miles (33.5 km) long.

There are two named tributaries of the Middle Platte River, East Platte River and East Branch Middle Platte River.

== See also ==
- Tributaries of the Platte River
- List of rivers of Iowa
