= Brushy Creek (Platte River tributary) =

Stream in Iowa and Missouri, U.S.

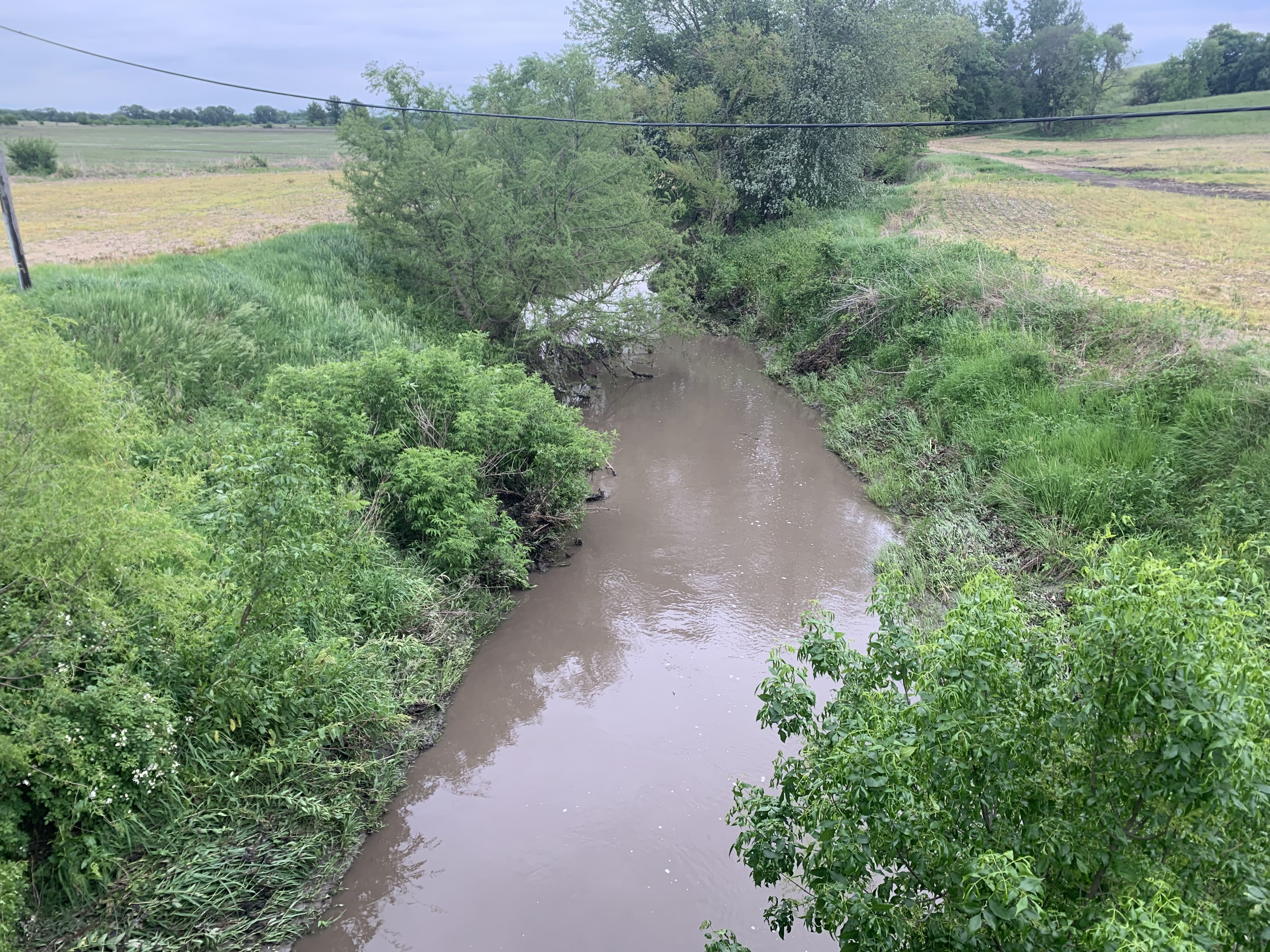
- Brushy Creek at Route NN bridge northwest of Parnell

Location
- Country: United States
- State: Iowa and Missouri
- County: Taylor County, Iowa, Worth County, Missouri, and Nodaway County, Missouri

Physical characteristics
- Source
  - location: Jackson Township, Taylor County
  - coordinates: 40°36′30″N 94°37′38″W
  - elevation: 1,210 ft (370 m)
- Mouth: Platte River
  - location: Independence Township, Nodaway County
  - coordinates: 40°25′59″N 94°38′05″W
  - elevation: 1,010 ft (310 m)
- Length: 15.3 mi (24.6 km)

Basin features
- Progression: Brushy Creek → Platte River → Missouri River → Mississippi River → Atlantic Ocean

Brushy Creek is a stream in Nodaway and Worth counties in Missouri and Taylor County, Iowa, in the United States. It is a tributary of the Platte River and is 15.3 miles (24.6 km) long. A variant name was Elm River or Branch.

The stream headwaters arise approximately six miles southeast of Bedford, Iowa and two miles north of the Iowa-Missouri State Line at an elevation of approximately 1250 feet. The stream flows southward into the northwest corner of Worth County, Missouri. Two miles to the south it veers to the right and enters Nodaway County. It flows south passing under Missouri Route 246 about one mile west of Sheridan. It continues to the south and enters the Platte River just west of the city of Parnell.

Brushy Creek was so named on account of brush near its course.

== See also ==
- Tributaries of the Platte River
- List of rivers of Iowa
- List of rivers of Missouri
