= Platte Township, Andrew County, Missouri =

Township in Andrew County, Missouri, U.S.

Platte Township
- Township
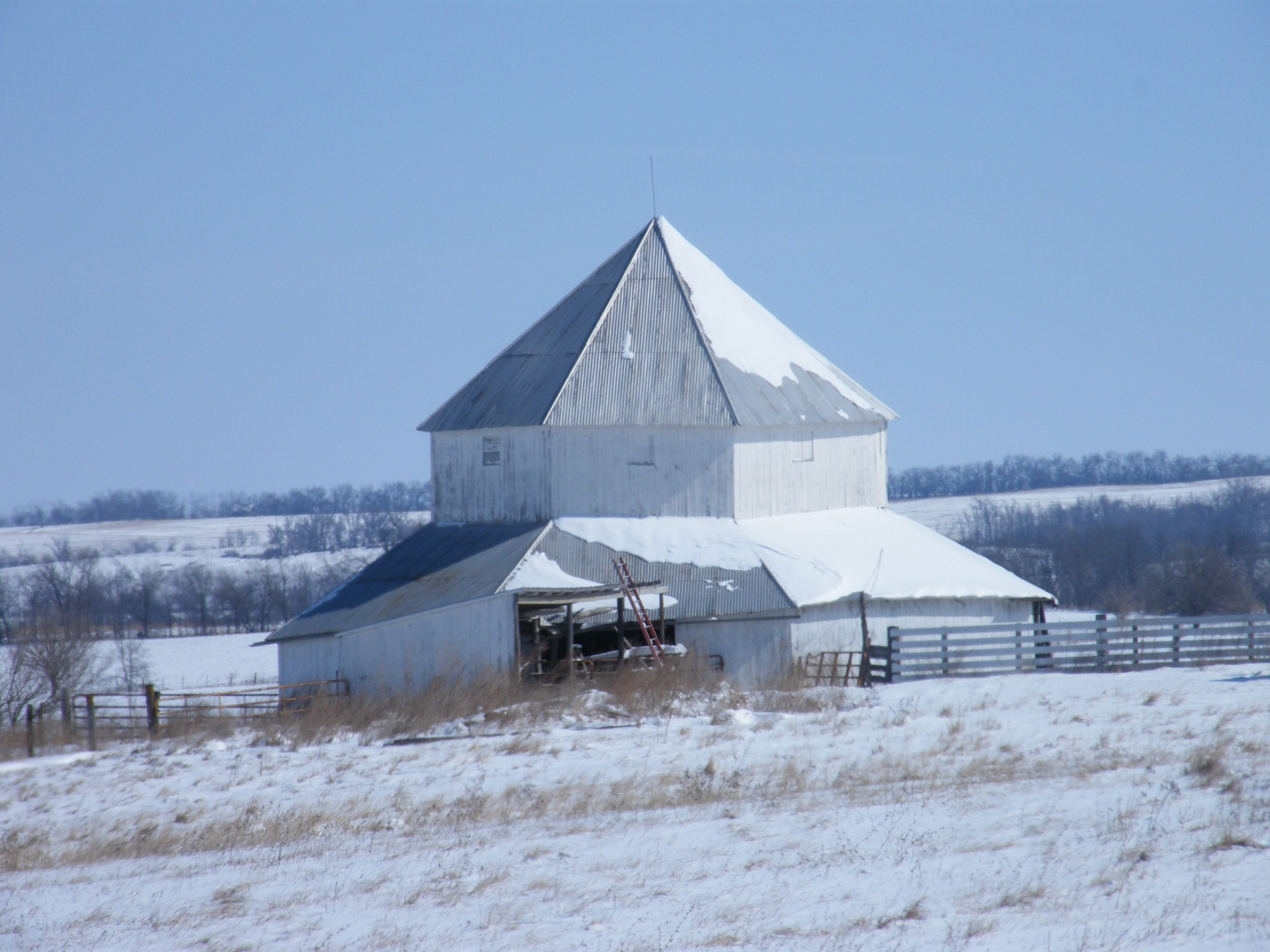
- Octagonal barn in Rea on the National Register of Historic Places

- Coordinates: 40°04′25″N 94°42′07″W
- Country: United States
- State: Missouri
- County: Andrew

Area
  - Total: 57.07 sq mi (147.8 km^{2})
  - Land: 56.63 sq mi (146.7 km^{2})
  - Water: 0.44 sq mi (1.1 km^{2}) 0.77%
- Elevation: 1,033 ft (315 m)

Population (2020)
  - Total: 403
  - Density: 7.1/sq mi (2.7/km^{2})
- FIPS code: 29-00358106
- GNIS feature ID: 766228

Platte Township is a township in Andrew County, Missouri, United States. At the 2020 census, its population was 403.

Platte Township was established in 1846, and named after the Platte River.

== Geography ==
Platte Township covers an area of 57.07 square miles (147.8 km^{2}) and contains one incorporated settlement, Rea. Three unincorporated villages: Cawood, Empire Prairie, and Whitesville were unincorporated settlements also in Platte Township. Cawood was located in the northwest of this township and was located along the Chicago Great Western Railway. Whitesville persists to today.

The streams of Clear Creek and Hickory Creek run through this township.

== Transportation ==
Platte Township contains two airports: Fairbanks Airport and Hannah Airport.

The following highways travel through the township:

- Route 48
- Route B
- Route BB
- Route D
- Route J
- Route M
- Route P
