= Sand Branch (Prairie Creek tributary) =

Stream in northwest Missouri, U.S.

Location
- Country: United States
- State: Missouri
- County: Platte

Physical characteristics
- Source
  - location: Carroll Township, Platte County
  - coordinates: 39°17′50″N 94°44′08″W
  - elevation: 980 ft (300 m)
- Mouth: Prairie Creek
  - location: Carroll Township, Platte County
  - coordinates: 39°18′29″N 94°47′51″W
  - elevation: 764 ft (233 m)
- Length: 4.2 mi (6.8 km)

Basin features
- Progression: Sand Branch → Prairie Creek → Platte River → Missouri River → Mississippi River → Atlantic Ocean

Sand Branch is a stream in Platte County in the U.S. state of Missouri. It is an indirect tributary of Platte River via the Prairie Creek. The stream is 4.2 miles long.

Sand Branch was so named on account of the sandy character of the creek bed.

== See also ==
- Tributaries of the Platte River
- List of rivers of Missouri
