= Empire Township, Andrew County, Missouri =

Township in Andrew County, Missouri, U.S.

Empire Township
- Township
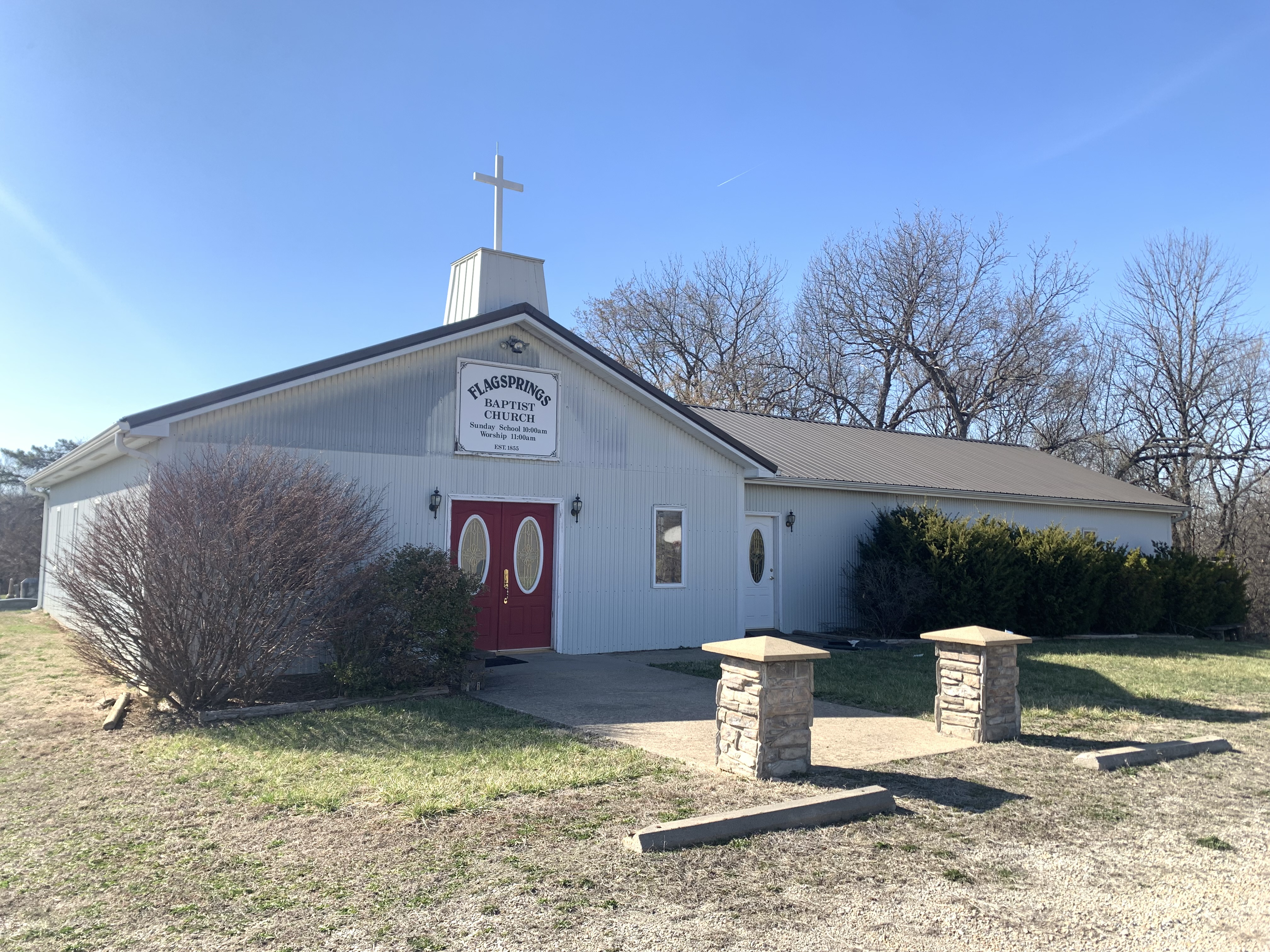
- Flag Springs Baptist Church

- Coordinates: 39°59′45″N 94°40′37″W
- Country: United States
- State: Missouri
- County: Andrew

Area
  - Total: 42.67 sq mi (110.5 km^{2})
  - Land: 42.32 sq mi (109.6 km^{2})
  - Water: 0.35 sq mi (0.91 km^{2}) 0.82%
- Elevation: 1,027 ft (313 m)

Population (2020)
  - Total: 438
  - Density: 10.3/sq mi (4.0/km^{2})
- FIPS code: 29-00322330
- GNIS feature ID: 766222

Empire Township is a township in Andrew County, Missouri, United States. At the 2020 census, its population was 438.

== Geography ==
Empire Township covers an area of 42.66 square miles (110.5 km^{2}) and contains no incorporated settlements. It contains one cemetery, Bedford Chapel.

The Platte River bisects the townships north to south, and the streams of Agee Creek and Crooked Creek are two of its named tributaries that run through this township. The One Hundred and Two River forms part of its western boundary.

== Transportation ==
The following highways travel through the township:

- U.S. Route 169
- Route AA
- Route D
- Route M
