= Morgan Branch (North Wyaconda River tributary) =

Stream in the American state of Missouri

Coordinates: 40.5172561°N 92.0415654°W

Morgan Branch Morgans Branch

Location
- Country: United States
- State: Missouri
- County: Scotland

Physical characteristics
- Mouth: North Wyaconda River

Morgan Branch (sometimes called Morgans Branch) is a stream in Scotland County in the U.S. state of Missouri. It is a tributary of the North Wyaconda River.

Morgan Branch has the name of Joseph K. Morgan, a pioneer citizen.

== See also ==
- List of rivers of Missouri
