= Opera Hall Block (King City, Missouri) =

Historic house in Missouri, United States

- U.S. National Register of Historic Places
- Location within Missouri Location within the United States
- Location: 101-03 W. Vermont/101-03 S. Connecticut, King City, Missouri
- Coordinates: 40°3′4″N 94°31′25″W
- Area: less than one acre
- Architect: Marshall, David
- Architectural style: Renaissance
- NRHP reference No.: 02000472
- Added to NRHP: May 9, 2002

Opera Hall Block, also known as the Farmers State Bank and Citizens National Bank Building, is a historic opera house and commercial block located at King City, Gentry County, Missouri. It was built in 1895, and is a 2 1/2-story, rectangular, Romanesque Revival style brick building. It measures 50 feet by 110 feet, and features a corner oriel window.

It was listed on the National Register of Historic Places in 2002.
