= Rea, Missouri =

Village in Andrew County, Missouri, United States

- Village
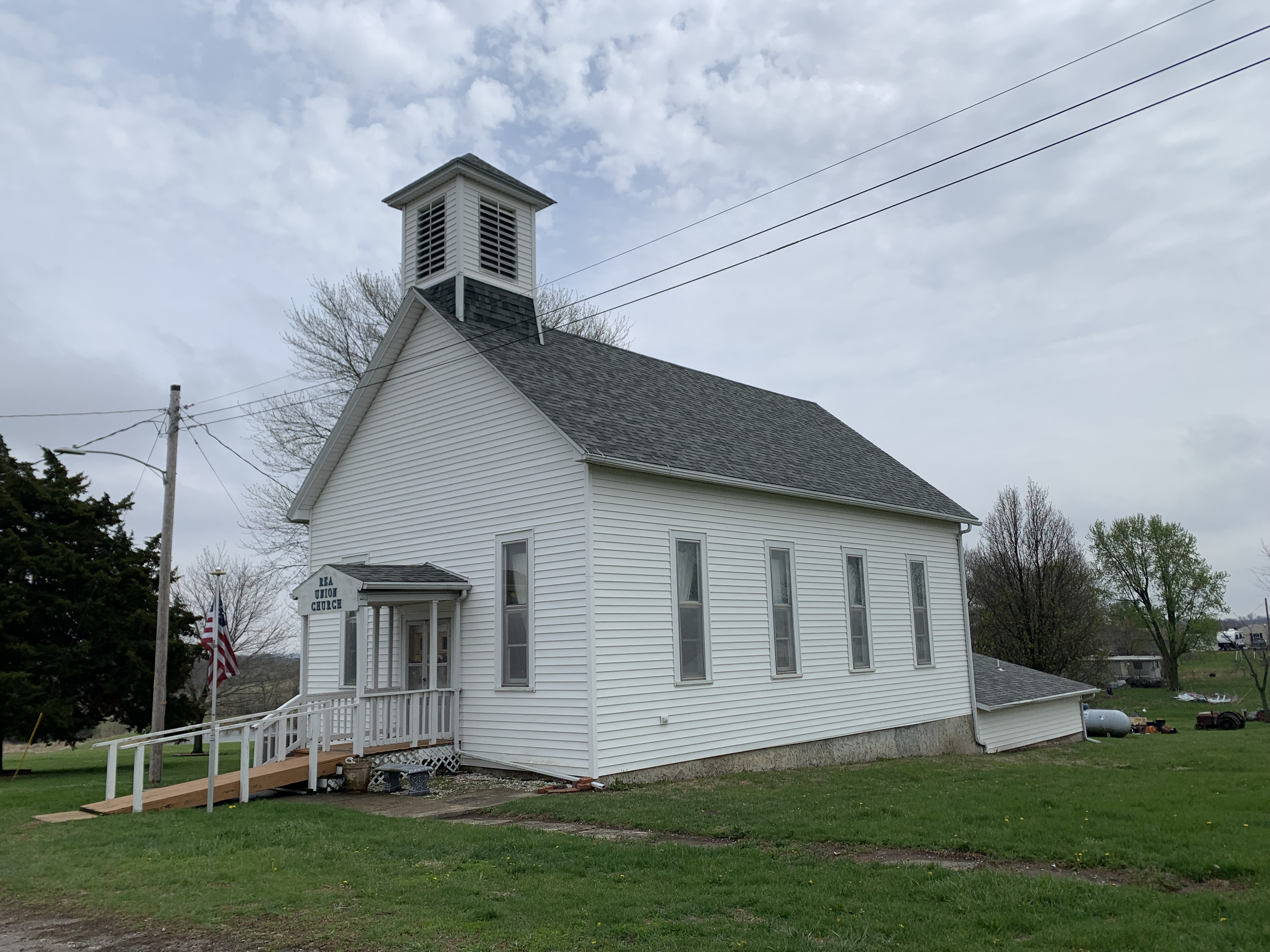
- Rea Union Church

- Location of Rea, Missouri
- Coordinates: 40°03′42″N 94°45′52″W
- Country: United States
- State: Missouri
- County: Andrew
- Township: Platte
- P.O. commissioned: 1898
- Incorporated: 1914

Area
  - Total: 0.12 sq mi (0.31 km^{2})
  - Land: 0.12 sq mi (0.31 km^{2})
  - Water: 0 sq mi (0.00 km^{2})
- Elevation: 1,076 ft (328 m)

Population (2020)
  - Total: 46
  - Density: 383.9/sq mi (148.21/km^{2})
- Time zone: UTC-6 (Central (CST))
  - Summer (DST): UTC-5 (CDT)
- ZIP code: 64480
- Area code: 816
- FIPS code: 29-60842
- GNIS feature ID: 2396330

Rea (pronounced ray /reɪ/) is a village in Platte Township, Andrew County, Missouri, United States. The population was 46 at the 2020 census. It is part of the St. Joseph, MO–KS Metropolitan Statistical Area.

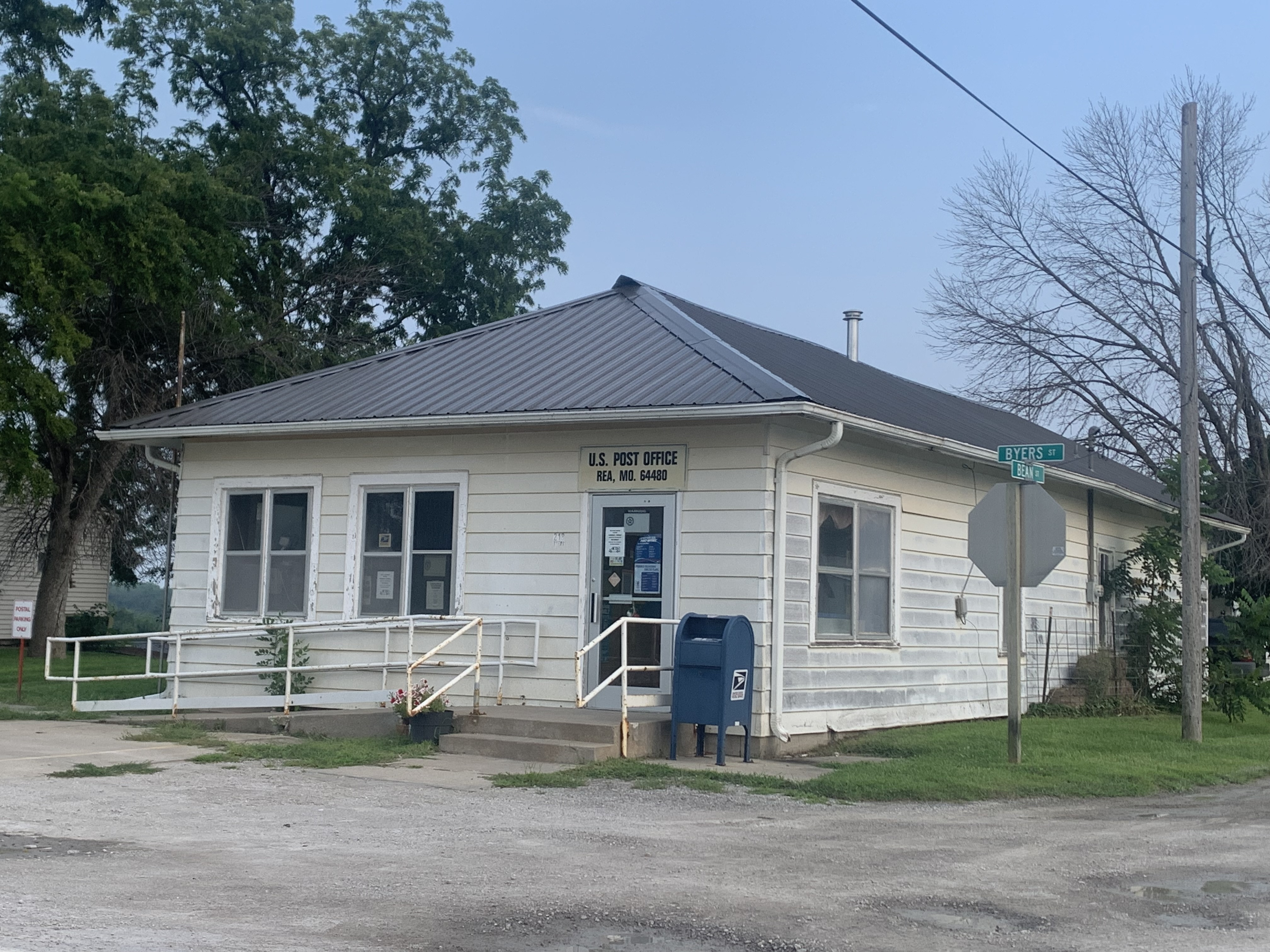
Post office of Rea

== History ==
A post office called Rea has been in operation since 1888. The city was named after Judge Joseph Rea, the original owner of the town site.

The J. F. Roberts Octagonal Barn was listed on the National Register of Historic Places in 1999.

== Geography ==
According to the United States Census Bureau, the city has a total area of 0.12 square miles (0.31 km^{2}), all land.

== Demographics ==
Historical population
Census	Pop.	Note	%±
1920	127		—
1930	94		−26.0%
1940	128		36.2%
1950	110		−14.1%
1960	90		−18.2%
1970	54		−40.0%
1980	78		44.4%
1990	62		−20.5%
2000	56		−9.7%
2010	50		−10.7%
2020	46		−8.0%
U.S. Decennial Census

=== 2010 census ===
As of the census of 2010, there were 50 people in 25 households, including 12 families, in the city. The population density was 416.7 inhabitants per square mile (160.9/km^{2}). There were 25 housing units at an average density of 208.3 per square mile (80.4/km^{2}). The racial makup of the city was 100.0% White.

Of the 25 households, 20.0% had children under the age of 18 living with them, 40.0% were married couples living together, 4.0% had a female householder with no husband present, 4.0% had a male householder with no wife present, and 52.0% were non-families. 40.0% of households were one person, and 24% were one person aged 65 or older. The average household size was 2.00 and the average family size was 2.75.

The median age was 49.3 years. 18% of residents were under the age of 18; 4% were between the ages of 18 and 24; 20% were from 25 to 44; 32% were from 45 to 64; and 26% were 65 or older. The gender makeup of the city was 48.0% male and 52.0% female.

=== 2000 census ===
As of the census of 2000, there were 56 people in 24 households, including 16 families, in the city. The population density was 461.2 inhabitants per square mile (178.1/km^{2}). There were 25 housing units at an average density of 205.9 per square mile (79.5/km^{2}). The racial makup of the city was 100.00% White.

Of the 24 households, 33.3% had children under the age of 18 living with them, 66.7% were married couples living together, and 29.2% were non-families. 25.0% of households were one person, and 8.3% were one person aged 65 or older. The average household size was 2.33 and the average family size was 2.76.

In the city the population was spread out, with 23.2% under the age of 18, 1.8% from 18 to 24, 35.7% from 25 to 44, 26.8% from 45 to 64, and 12.5% 65 or older. The median age was 40 years. For every 100 females, there were 107.4 males. For every 100 females age 18 and over, there were 104.8 males.

The median household income was $31,250 and the median family income was $37,188. Males had a median income of $35,625 versus $11,667 for females. The per capita income for the city was $13,639. There were no families and 4.3% of the population living below the poverty line, including no under eighteens and none of those over 64.

== Education ==
It is in the North Andrew County R-VI School District.

== See also ==
- List of municipalities in Missouri
