= Bayfield, Missouri =

Extinct hamlet in Missouri, U.S.

Coordinates: 39°46′55″N 94°35′46″W

Bayfield is an extinct town in the southwest corner of DeKalb County, in the U.S. state of Missouri. The community was on the Little Third Fork Platte River approximately three miles southwest of Clarksdale and one-quarter mile east of the DeKalb-Buchanan county line.

Bayfield had its start c. 1880 when the Chicago, Rock Island, and Pacific Railway was extended to that point. A post office called Bayfield was established in 1886, and remained in operation until 1917.
