= J. F. Roberts Octagonal Barn =

Structure in Missouri, U.S.

- U.S. National Register of Historic Places
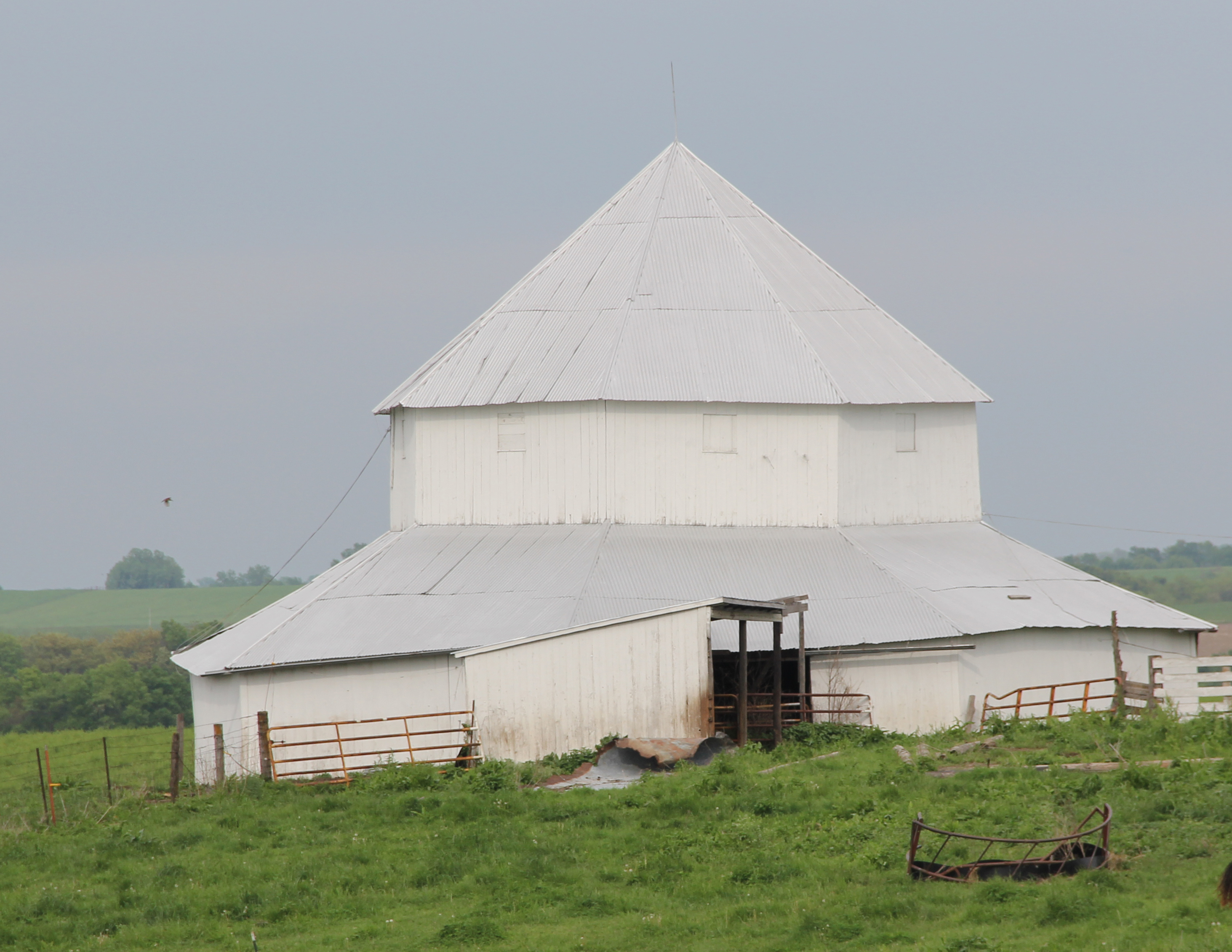
- J. F. Roberts Octagonal Barn, May 2015

- Location within Missouri Location within the United States
- Location: Jct. MO B and MO 48, near Rea, Missouri
- Coordinates: 40°3′47″N 94°44′44″W
- Area: less than one acre
- Built: c. 1900
- Architectural style: octagonal barn
- NRHP reference No.: 99001362
- Added to NRHP: November 18, 1999

J. F. Roberts Octagonal Barn, also known as the Clark Octagonal Barn, is a historic octagon barn located near Rea, Andrew County, Missouri, United States. It was built about 1900, and is a two-story, octagonal wood-frame structure constructed of interior post and beam framing. The central section is topped by an eight-sided hipped roof.

It was listed on the National Register of Historic Places in 1999.
