= Grant Township, Adams County, Iowa =

Township in Iowa, US

Grant Township, Adams County
- Township
- Coordinates: 40°56′58″N 094°32′14″W
- Country: United States
- State: Iowa
- County: Adams

Area
  - Total: 35.84 sq mi (92.83 km^{2})
  - Land: 35.80 sq mi (92.72 km^{2})
  - Water: 0.039 sq mi (0.1 km^{2})
- Elevation: 1,230 ft (375 m)

Population (2010)
  - Total: 201
  - Density: 5.7/sq mi (2.2/km^{2})
- Time zone: UTC-6 (CST)
  - Summer (DST): UTC-5 (CDT)
- FIPS code: 19-91626
- GNIS feature ID: 0467929

Grant Township is one of twelve townships in Adams County, Iowa, United States. At the 2010 census, its population was 201.

== Geography ==
Grant Township covers an area of 35.84 square miles (92.8 km^{2}) and contains no incorporated settlements. According to the USGS, it contains two cemeteries: Salem and Stringtown. Stringtown is a small unincorporated hamlet that is located in Grant Township.
