= Green Township, Platte County, Missouri =

Township in Platte County, Missouri, U.S.

Green Township
- Township
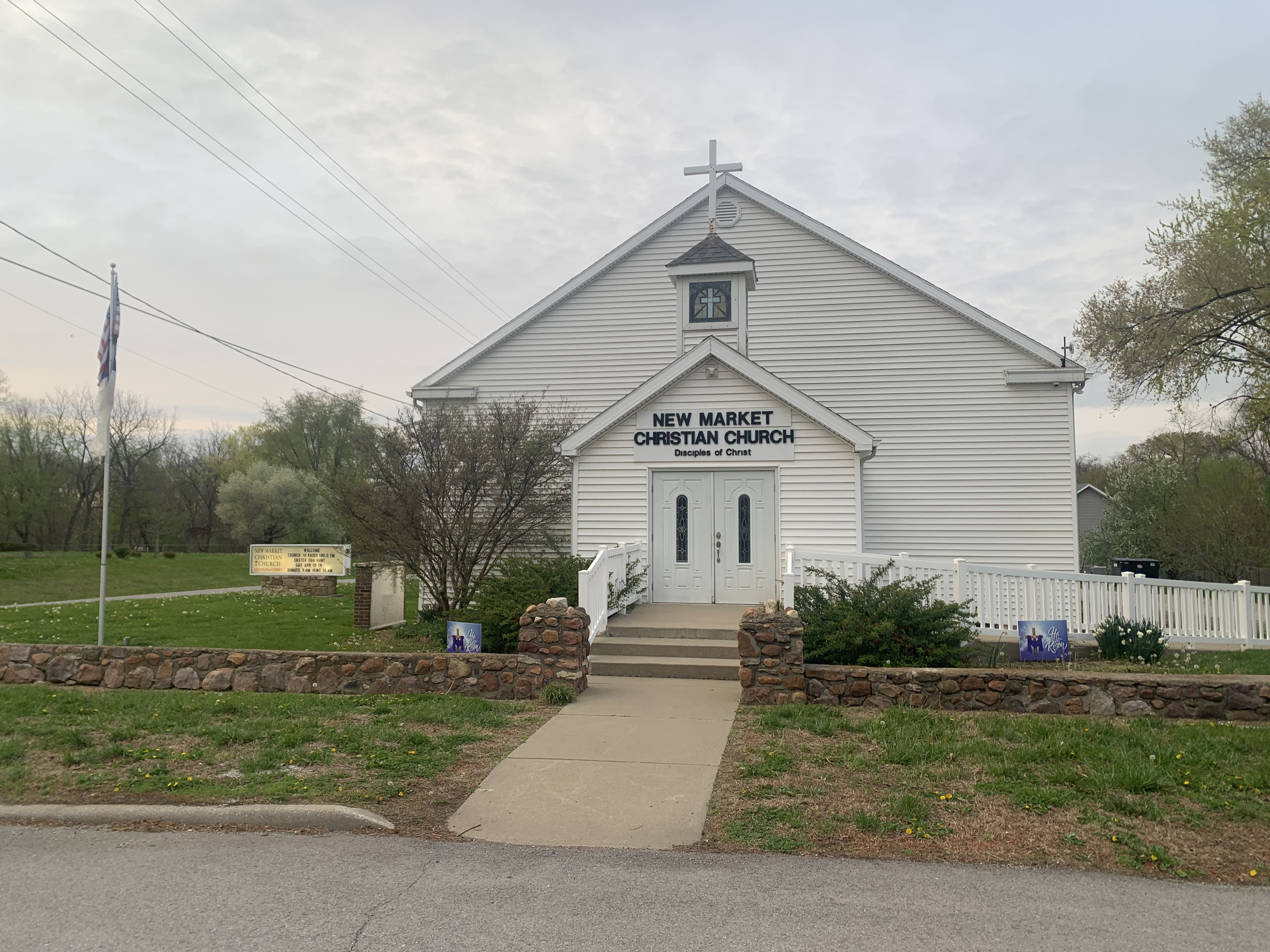
- New Market Christian Church in New Market, Missouri

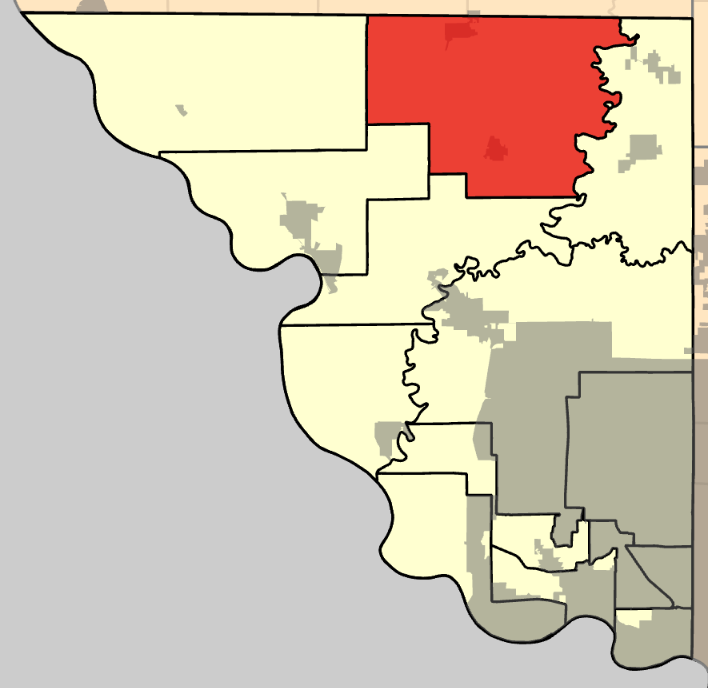
- Coordinates: 39°29′33″N 94°44′49″W
- Country: United States
- State: Missouri
- County: Platte

Area
  - Total: 58.79 sq mi (152.3 km^{2})
  - Land: 58.56 sq mi (151.7 km^{2})
  - Water: 0.23 sq mi (0.60 km^{2}) 0.39%
- Elevation: 938 ft (286 m)

Population (2020)
  - Total: 2,111
  - Density: 36.1/sq mi (13.9/km^{2})
- FIPS code: 29-16529026
- GNIS feature ID: 767199

Green Township is a township in Platte County, Missouri, United States. At the 2020 census, its population was 2,111.

Green Township was erected in 1839.
