= Spaulding Township, Union County, Iowa =

Township in Iowa, U.S.

Coordinates: 41°06′54″N 94°24′52″W

Spaulding Township is a township in Union County, Iowa, United States.
