= Lafayette Township, Clinton County, Missouri =

Township in Clinton County, Missouri, U.S.

Lafayette Township
- Township
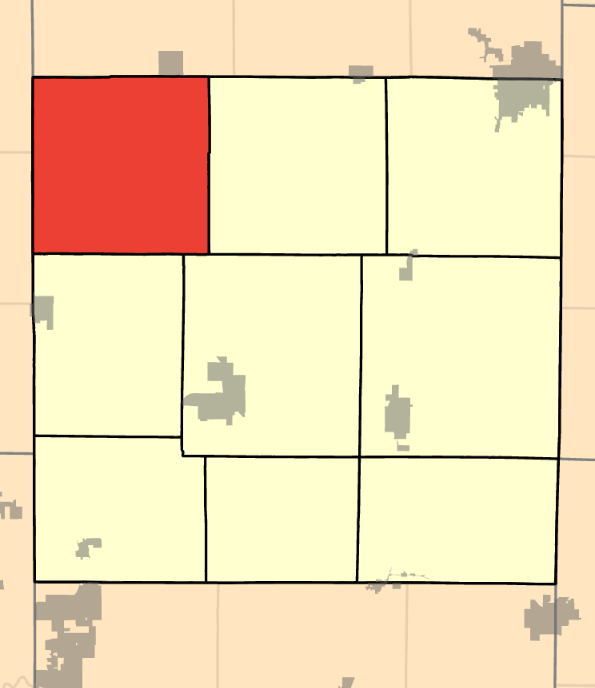
- Coordinates: 39°41′46″N 94°32′14″W
- Country: United States
- State: Missouri
- County: Clinton

Area
  - Total: 49.6 sq mi (128 km^{2})
  - Land: 49.57 sq mi (128.4 km^{2})
  - Water: 0.03 sq mi (0.078 km^{2}) 0.06%
- Elevation: 951 ft (290 m)

Population (2020)
  - Total: 721
  - Density: 14.5/sq mi (5.6/km^{2})
- FIPS code: 29-04939674
- GNIS feature ID: 766516

Lafayette Township is a township in Clinton County, Missouri, United States. At the 2020 census, its population was 721.

Lafayette Township was established in 1833, taking the name of Gilbert du Motier, Marquis de Lafayette.
