= King City, Missouri =

City in Gentry County, Missouri, United States

- City
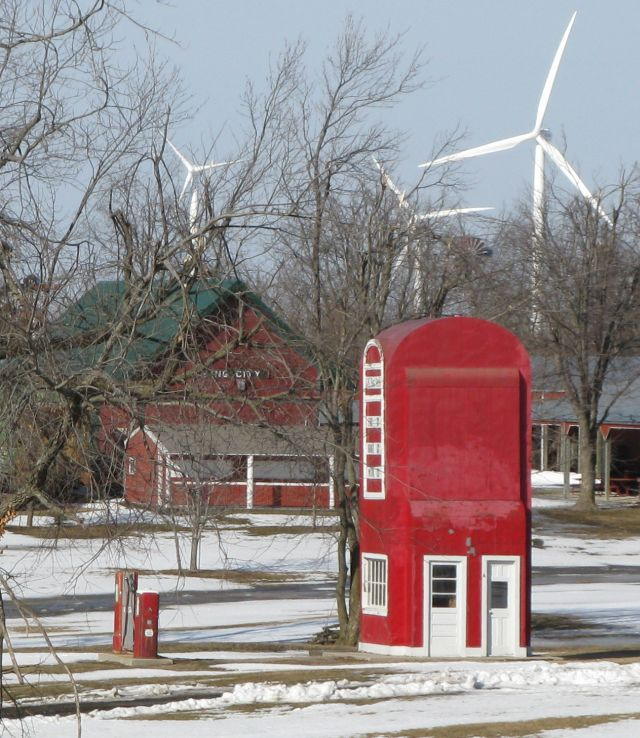
- Big Pump and wind farm in the Tri-County Historical Park

- Location of King City, Missouri

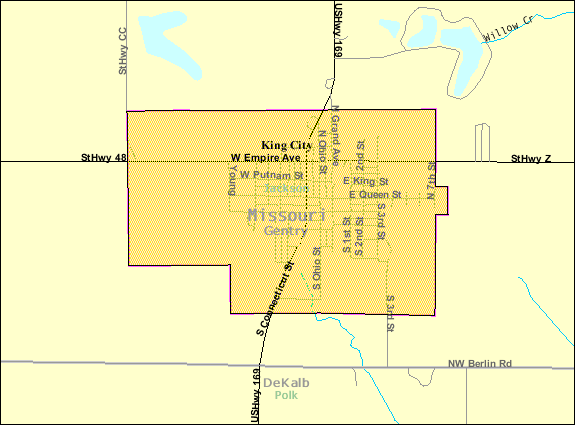
- U.S. Census Map
- Coordinates: 40°03′02″N 94°31′31″W
- Country: United States
- State: Missouri
- County: Gentry
- Township: Jackson

Area
  - Total: 1.38 sq mi (3.58 km^{2})
  - Land: 1.38 sq mi (3.58 km^{2})
  - Water: 0 sq mi (0.00 km^{2})
- Elevation: 1,109 ft (338 m)

Population (2020)
  - Total: 799
  - Density: 578.2/sq mi (223.25/km^{2})
- Time zone: UTC-6 (Central (CST))
  - Summer (DST): UTC-5 (CDT)
- ZIP code: 64463
- Area code: 660
- FIPS code: 29-38774
- GNIS feature ID: 2395536
- Website: www.kccityhall.com

King City is a city in southwest Gentry County, Missouri, United States. The population was 799 at the 2020 census.

== History ==
John Pittsenbarger was the first European settler when he set up a tent in town in 1856. His application to name the town Petersburg was rejected because there was already a town of that name in Boone County, Missouri. According to local legend, the United States Postmaster General submitted his name. The Postmaster General at the time was Horatio King, (although the local history refers to Rufus King)

King City was formally platted on July 29, 1869 by Pittsenbarger.

The town became a stop on the St. Joseph and Des Moines Railway in 1878. The railway eventually became part of the Burlington Northern network and is currently abandoned.

In the first half of the 20th century, King City was the heart of a Kentucky bluegrass seed harvesting region stretching from Kearney, Missouri through King City to Maitland, Missouri, which claimed to harvest more bluegrass seeds than the entire state of Kentucky with King City resident John Weller claiming to be the "King of Blue Grass Raisers.". Bluegrass seed production moved to the farming areas of the Pacific Northwest in the 1950s.

In the 1990s, the Big Pump, a 25-foot (7.6 m) high building resembling an electric gasoline pump, was moved from Maryville, Missouri to King City. It is on the National Register of Historic Places. Rufus Limpp, an oil jobber who built the station, is from King City (the Limpp Community Lake by King City is also named for him). The Big Pump is located on the Tri-County Museum grounds.

King City has only one grocery store, McCrea's, a family operated business operating for more than 50 years.

One prominent former King Citian was celebrated children's author Clyde Robert Bulla, who died in 2007 while living in Warrensburg, Missouri.

In 2006, St. Louis, Missouri-based Wind Capital Group began operation of 27 windmills a mile north of King City. The Bluegrass Ridge Wind Farm is the first commercial electric windmill operation in the state. Its windmills are 300 feet (91 m) high. The wind farm name celebrates the region's bluegrass heritage.

The Opera Hall Block was listed on the National Register of Historic Places in 2002.

== Geography ==
King City is located on US Route 169 three-quarters of a mile north of the Gentry-Dekalb county line. Stanberry is eleven miles to the north and Union Star in northwest Dekalb County is approximately six miles to the southwest.

According to the United States Census Bureau, the city has a total area of 1.38 square miles (3.57 km^{2}), all land.

== Demographics ==
Historical population
Census	Pop.	Note	%±
1880	196		—
1890	622		217.3%
1900	905		45.5%
1910	966		6.7%
1920	1,150		19.0%
1930	1,101		−4.3%
1940	1,103		0.2%
1950	1,031		−6.5%
1960	1,009		−2.1%
1970	1,023		1.4%
1980	1,063		3.9%
1990	986		−7.2%
2000	1,012		2.6%
2010	1,013		0.1%
2020	799		−21.1%
U.S. Decennial Census

=== 2010 census ===
As of the census of 2010, there were 1,013 people, 411 households, and 266 families residing in the city. The population density was 734.1 inhabitants per square mile (283.4/km^{2}). There were 465 housing units at an average density of 337.0 per square mile (130.1/km^{2}). The racial makeup of the city was 98.4% White, 0.1% African American, 0.1% Native American, 0.3% Asian, 0.2% from other races, and 0.9% from two or more races. Hispanic or Latino of any race were 1.1% of the population.

There were 411 households, of which 31.9% had children under the age of 18 living with them, 49.1% were married couples living together, 12.4% had a female householder with no husband present, 3.2% had a male householder with no wife present, and 35.3% were non-families. 30.7% of all households were made up of individuals, and 16.5% had someone living alone who was 65 years of age or older. The average household size was 2.38 and the average family size was 2.97.

The median age in the city was 40 years. 25.9% of residents were under the age of 18; 7.6% were between the ages of 18 and 24; 23.9% were from 25 to 44; 21.5% were from 45 to 64; and 20.9% were 65 years of age or older. The gender makeup of the city was 46.4% male and 53.6% female.

=== 2000 census ===
As of the census of 2000, there were 1,012 people, 418 households, and 285 families reside in the city. The population density was 732.8 inhabitants per square mile (282.9/km^{2}). There were 485 housing units at an average density of 351.2 per square mile (135.6/km^{2}). The racial makeup of the city was 98.72% White, 0.20% African American, 0.20% Native American, and 0.89% from two or more races. Hispanic or Latino of any race were 1.09% of the population.

There were 418 households, of which 33.5% had children under the age of 18 living with them. 56.9% of households were married couples living together, 7.7% had a female householder with no husband present, and 31.8% were non-families. 30.4% of all households were made up of individuals, and 17.2% had someone living alone who was 65 years of age or older. The average household size was 2.41 and the average family size was 2.98.

In the city, the population was spread out, with 28.0% under the age of 18, 7.4% from 18 to 24, 25.5% from 25 to 44, 18.7% from 45 to 64, and 20.5% who were 65 years of age or older. The median age was 37 years. For every 100 females, there were 92.8 males. For every 100 females age 18 and over, there were 83.2 males.

The median income for a household in the city was $24,605, and the median income for a family was $32,614. Males had a median income of $28,068 versus $18,750 for females. The per capita income for the city was $14,177. About 11.3% of families and 16.0% of the population were below the poverty line, including 20.2% of those under age 18 and 13.0% of those age 65 or over.

== Education ==
There are two schools, an elementary and junior high/high school, both named King City R-1. The schools consisted of neighboring buildings for many years, until a fire confined both schools into a single building while a new high school was constructed. In a subsequent remodeling, the two separate buildings were joined with a classroom/hallway addition. They have finished construction; making a new Ag building and more classrooms in both the High School and Elementary.

== Sports ==
University of Missouri standout and NFL Hall of Famer Roger Wehrli of the former St. Louis (now Arizona) Cardinals is an alumnus of King City High School. King City's football field is named Wehrli Field after him. Currently, committees are engaging in raising funds for the purpose of upgrading the track.

== See also ==
- List of cities in Missouri
