= Carroll Township, Platte County, Missouri =

Township in Platte County, Missouri, U.S.

Carroll Township
- Township
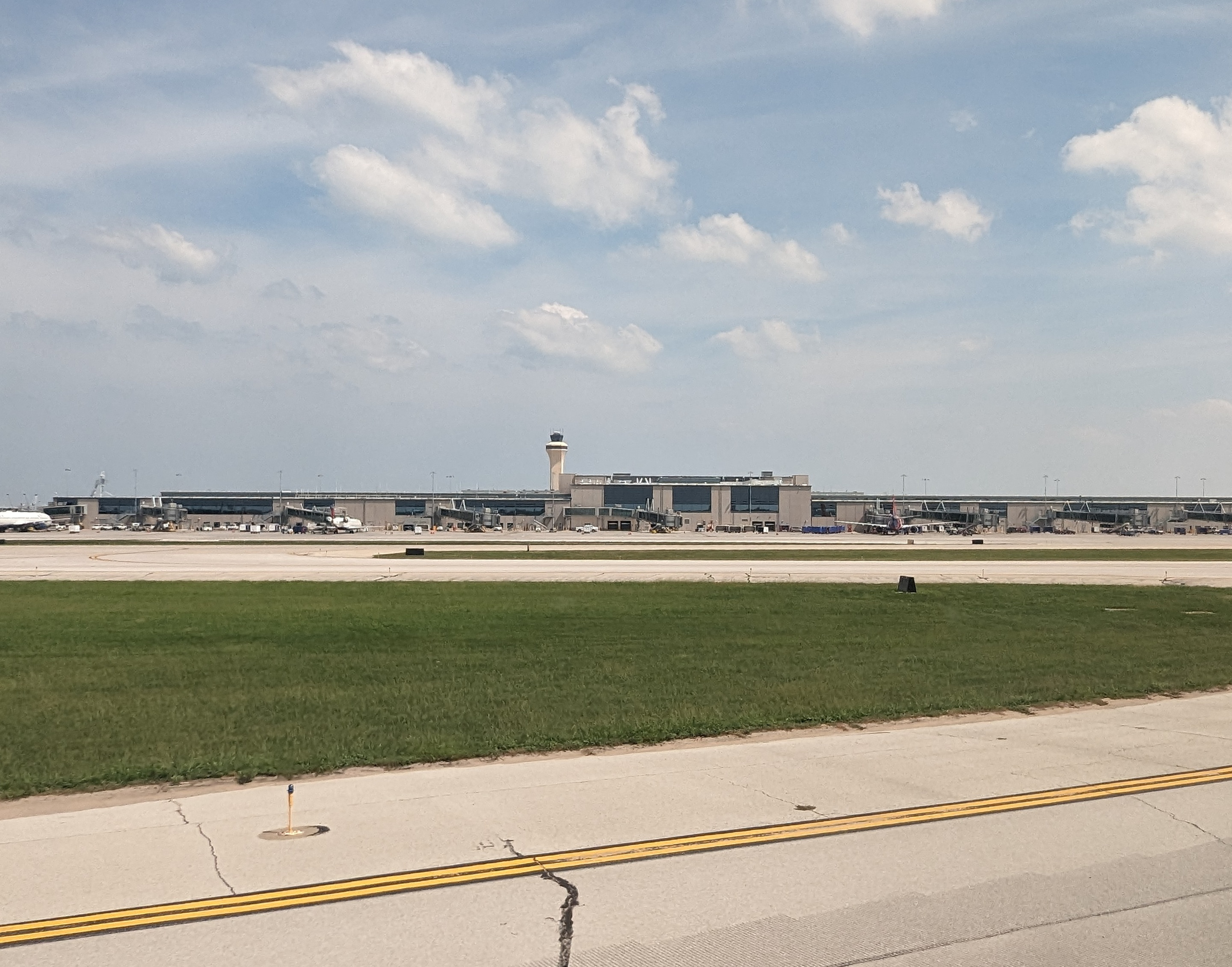
- Kansas City International Airport Terminal in central Carroll Township

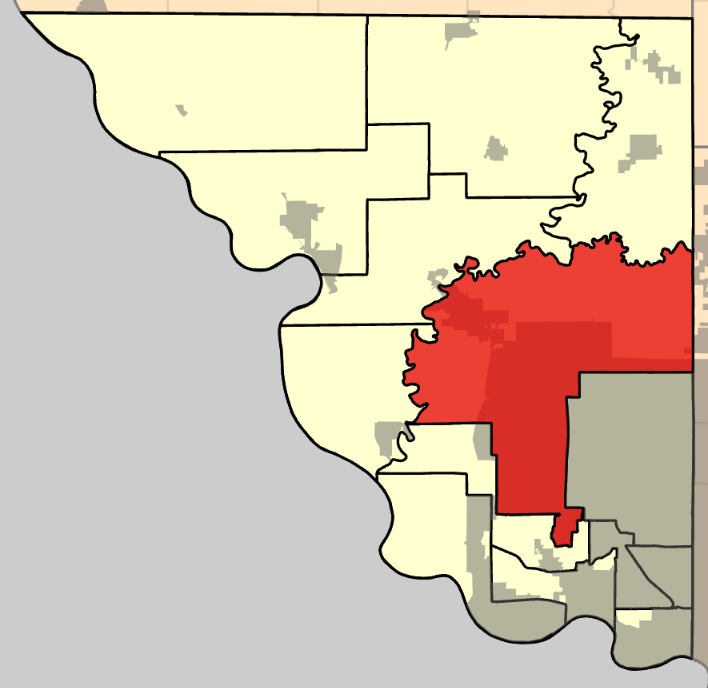
- Coordinates: 39°20′38″N 94°42′47″W
- Country: United States
- State: Missouri
- County: Platte

Area
  - Total: 73.5 sq mi (190 km^{2})
  - Land: 72.78 sq mi (188.5 km^{2})
  - Water: 0.72 sq mi (1.9 km^{2}) 0.98%
- Elevation: 938 ft (286 m)

Population (2020)
  - Total: 17,959
  - Density: 246.5/sq mi (95.2/km^{2})
- FIPS code: 29-16511512
- GNIS feature ID: 767196

Carroll Township is a township in Platte County, Missouri, United States. At the 2020 census, its population was 17,959.

Carroll Township was erected in 1839.
