= Whitesville, Missouri =

Unincorporated community in Andrew County, Missouri, United States

Coordinates: 40°03′40″N 94°43′10″W

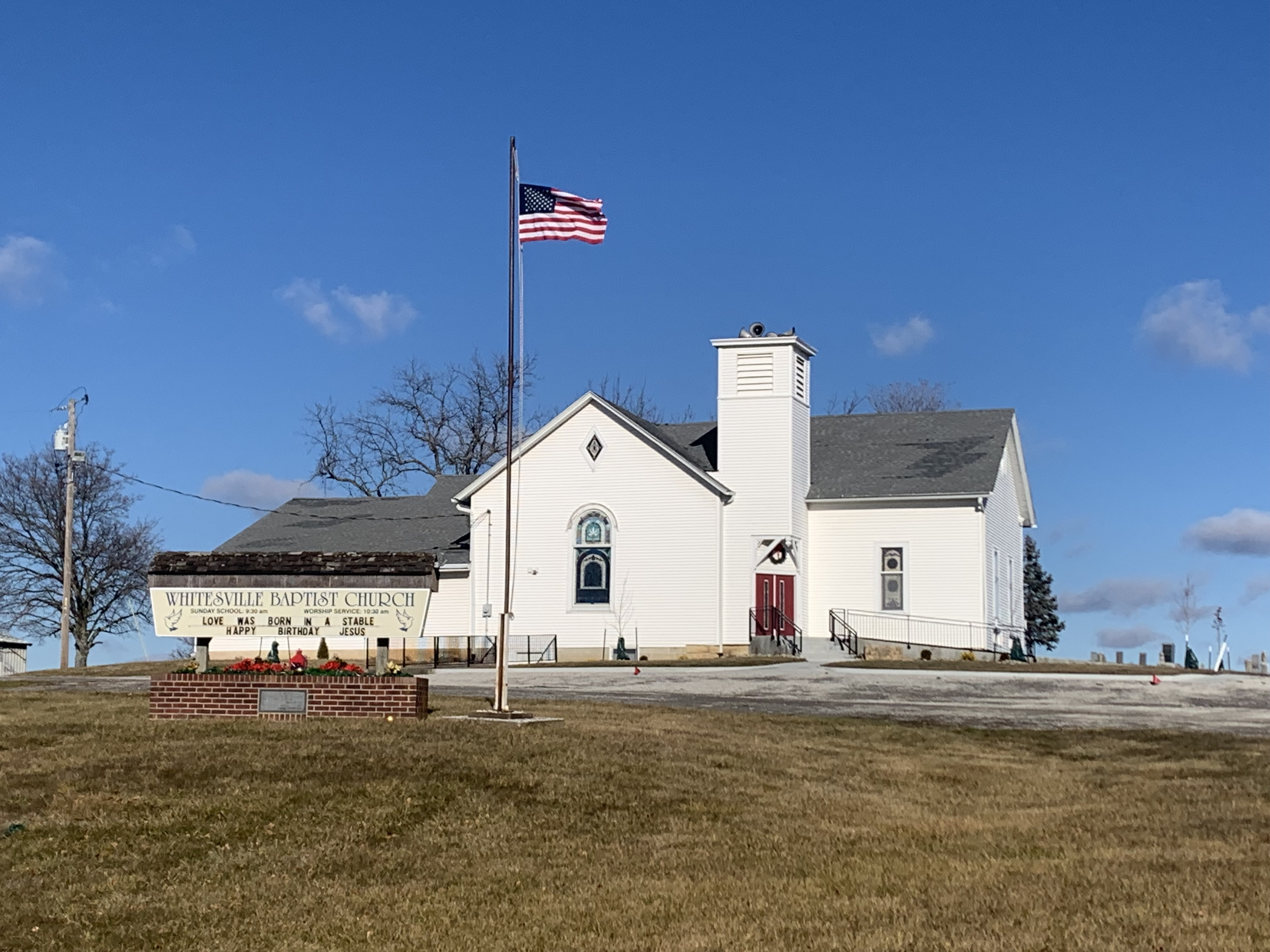
Church in Whitesville

Whitesville is an unincorporated community in Andrew County, in the U.S. state of Missouri. The community is part of the St. Joseph, MO–KS Metropolitan Statistical Area.

== History ==
Whitesville was founded in 1849. A post office called Whitesville was established in 1850, and remained in operation until 1953. The community was named after John D. White, one of the founders. An alternate name was Whiteville.
