= Platte River (Iowa and Missouri) =

River in Iowa and Missouri, U.S.

Platte River Little Platte River
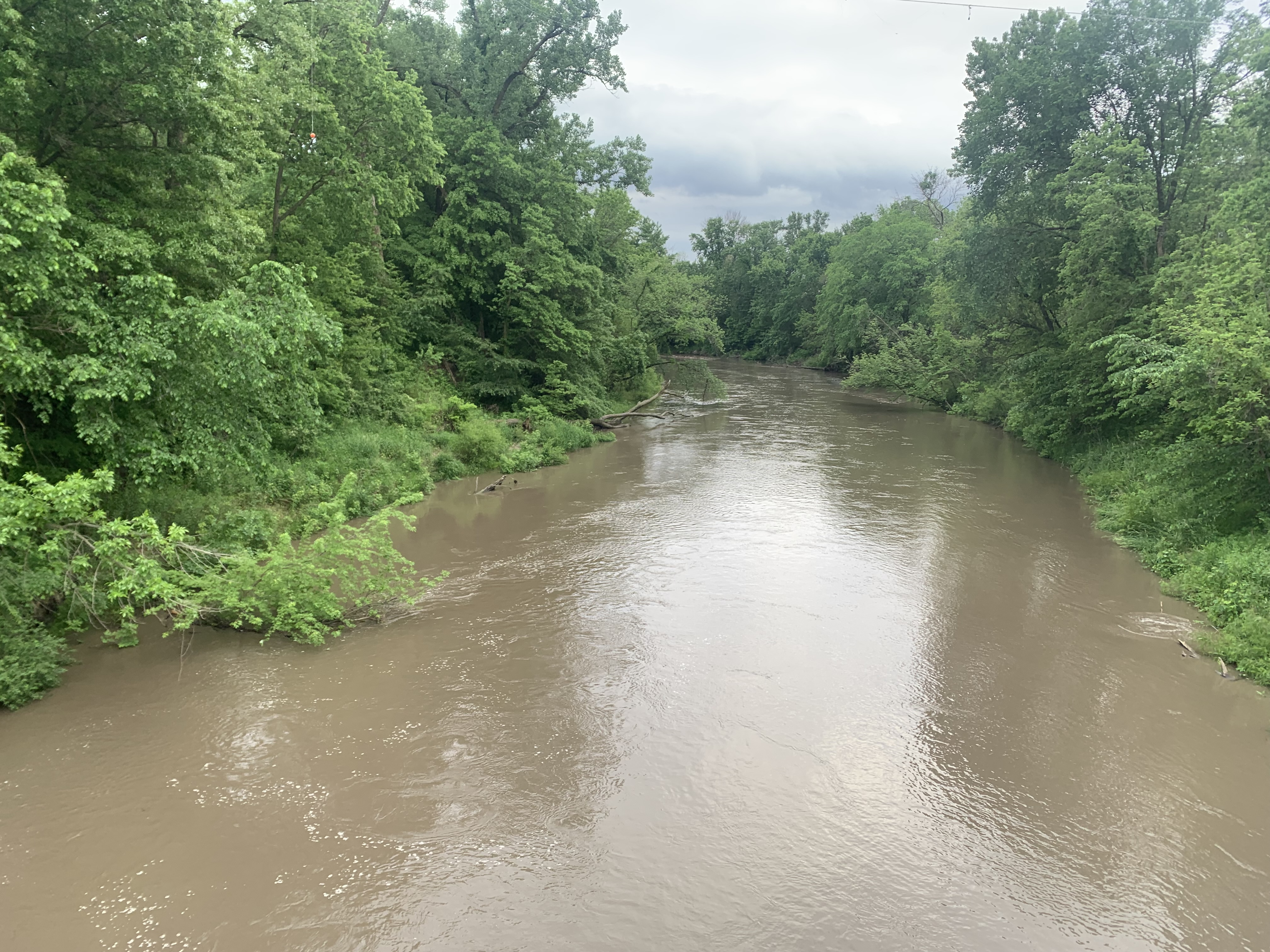
- Platte River at 200 St bridge just west of Parnell, Missouri

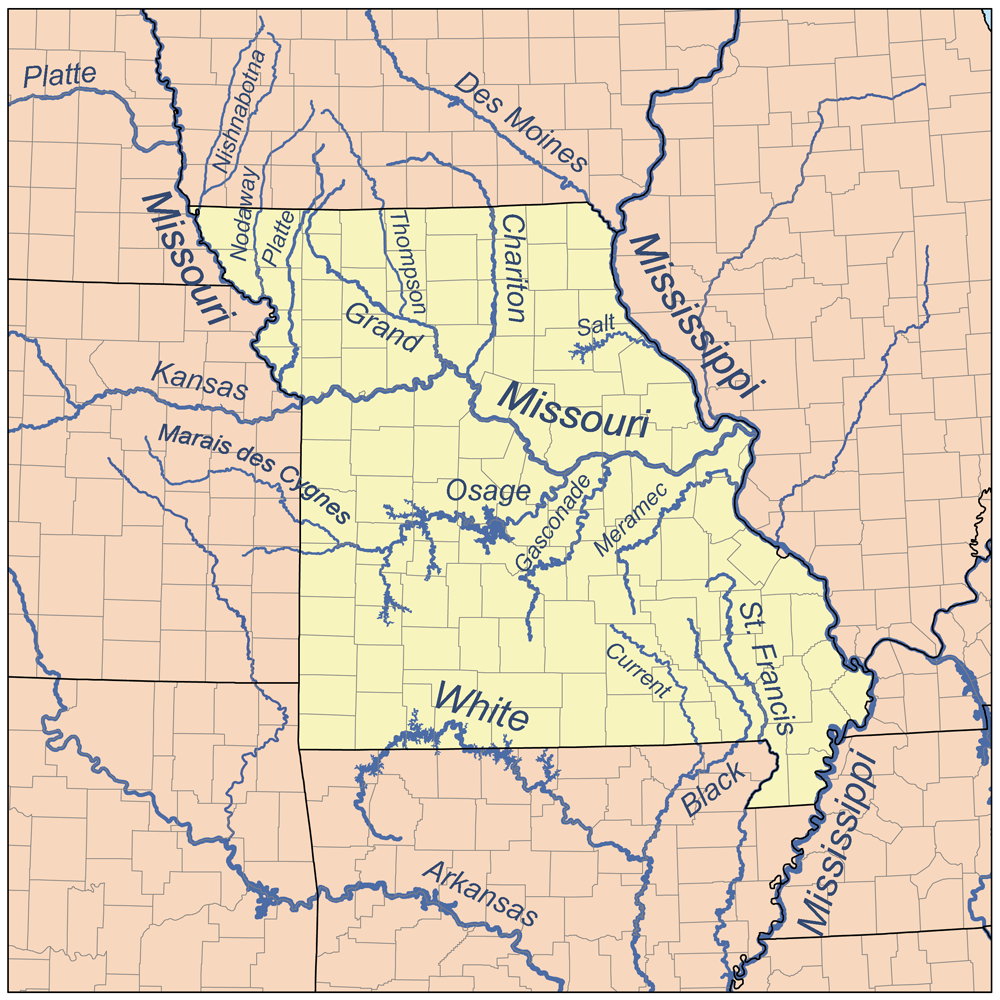
- Map of northern Missouri rivers

Location
- Country: United States
- State: Iowa and Missouri
- County: Platte County, Missouri, Buchanan County, Missouri, Andrew County, Missouri, Nodaway County, Missouri, Worth County, Missouri, Taylor County, Iowa, Ringgold County, Iowa, Adams County, Iowa, Union County, Iowa

Physical characteristics
- Source
  - location: Spaulding Township, Union County
  - coordinates: 41°09′25″N 94°23′00″W
  - elevation: 1,350 ft (410 m)
- Mouth: Missouri River
  - location: Lee Township, Platte County
  - coordinates: 39°15′51″N 94°50′15″W
  - elevation: 738 ft (225 m)
- Length: 195.5 mi (314.6 km)
- Discharge
  - location: Agency, Missouri
  - average: 980 cu ft/s (28 m^{3}/s)
- Discharge
  - location: Sharps Station, Missouri
  - average: 1,925 cu ft/s (54.5 m^{3}/s)
  - minimum: 12 cu ft/s (0.34 m^{3}/s)
  - maximum: 37,800 cu ft/s (1,070 m^{3}/s)

Basin features
- Progression: Platte River → Missouri River → Mississippi River → Atlantic Ocean
- Stream gradient 3.1 ft/mi (0.59 m/km)

The Platte River is a tributary of the Missouri River and is 195.5 miles (314.6 km) long. It is located in southwestern Iowa and northwestern Missouri in the United States and is also known as Little Platte River to distinguish it from the larger Platte River, also a tributary of the Missouri, in nearby Nebraska. The Platte River of Missouri itself has a tributary known as the Little Platte River.

== Course ==
The Platte River rises near Creston in Union County, Iowa, and flows generally southwardly through Adams, Ringgold and Taylor Counties in Iowa; and Worth, Nodaway, Andrew, Buchanan and Platte Counties in Missouri. Along its course it passes the Iowa towns of Maloy, Blockton and Athelstan; and the Missouri towns of Sheridan, Parnell, Ravenwood, Conception Junction, Guilford, Tracy, Platte City and Farley. The Platte flows into the Missouri River near Farley, downstream of Leavenworth, Kansas.

Several sections of the river's course have been straightened and channelized.

== History ==
When Missouri entered the union in 1821, the western border of Missouri from Arkansas to Iowa was based on the confluence of the Kansas River and Missouri River in the West Bottoms in Kansas City. Land in what is now the northwest Missouri was deeded to the Ioway, Sauk and Meskwaki tribes.

However, settlers (most notably Joseph Robidoux in St. Joseph, Missouri) began encroaching on the land. Further settlers in northern Missouri were upset about being cut off from the Missouri.

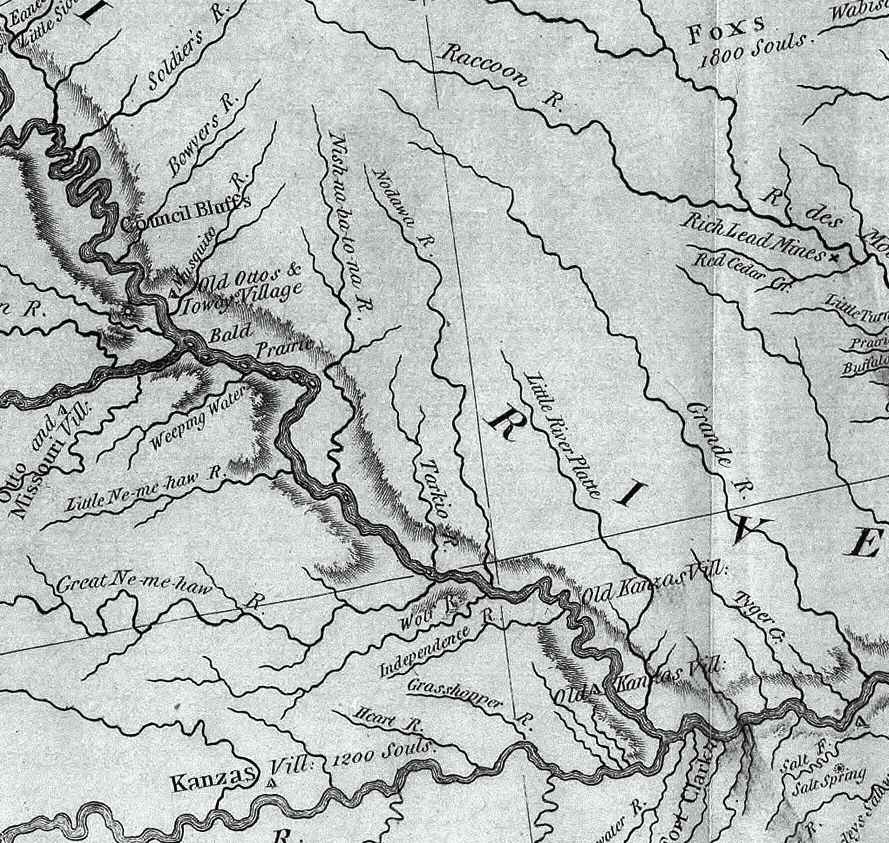
Excerpt from the Lewis and Clark map of 1814 shows the river identified as the "Little River Platte"

A variant spelling was 'Platt'.

In 1836, William Clark (of Lewis and Clark) persuaded the tribes to sell their lands in northwest Missouri. The deal known as the Platte Purchase was named for the river was ratified in 1837 and the tribes were paid $7,500 for an area about the combined size of Delaware and Rhode Island. The land was then annexed to Missouri.

In 1838 settlers used the river (and the Nodaway River) to reach the heart of the newly available land. The Platte River is not used for transportation in modern times although Missouri River steam boats did call on Tracy, Missouri.

On September 3, 1861, bushwhackers burned a bridge over the river at St. Joseph, Missouri, derailing a Hannibal & St. Joseph Railroad train killing between 17 and 20 and injuring 200 in one of the worst attacks on a passenger train in the Platte Bridge Railroad Tragedy during the American Civil War. Union forces were to burn Platte City, Missouri in 1861 and 1864 as they tried to force the residents to give up Silas M. Gordon, the suspected ringleader of the attack.

The river is the biggest river in the Platte Purchase area and it flows through the Kansas City Metropolitan Area as well as St. Joseph, Missouri metropolitan area. The river is an eighth order river.

Average flow at mile 25.1 is 1,925 cubic feet per second (54.5 cubic metres per second). The highest flow was 37,800 cu ft/s (1,070 m^{3}/s) during the Great Flood of 1993 on July 26, 1993. The lowest flow was 12 cu ft/s (0.34 m^{3}/s) during a drought in August 1989.

== Tributaries ==
The Platte River watershed contains a few major streams in their own right.

- Near its headwaters in Iowa the Platte collects minor branches known as the West Platte River, Middle Platte River, and East Platte River.
- In Buchanan County, Missouri, it collects the One Hundred and Two River and the Third Fork Platte River. The Third Fork collects the Little Third Fork, which flows southwardly through DeKalb and Buchanan Counties, past Clarksdale. Before leaving Buchanan County Castile Creek enters from the northeast.
- In Platte County, Missouri, it collects the Little Platte River, which rises in DeKalb County and flows south-southwestwardly through Clinton and Clay Counties, past Plattsburg and Smithville. Near Smithville, a U.S. Army Corps of Engineers dam causes the Little Platte River to form Smithville Lake.

The following is a comprehensive list of all named direct and indirect tributaries of the Platte River:

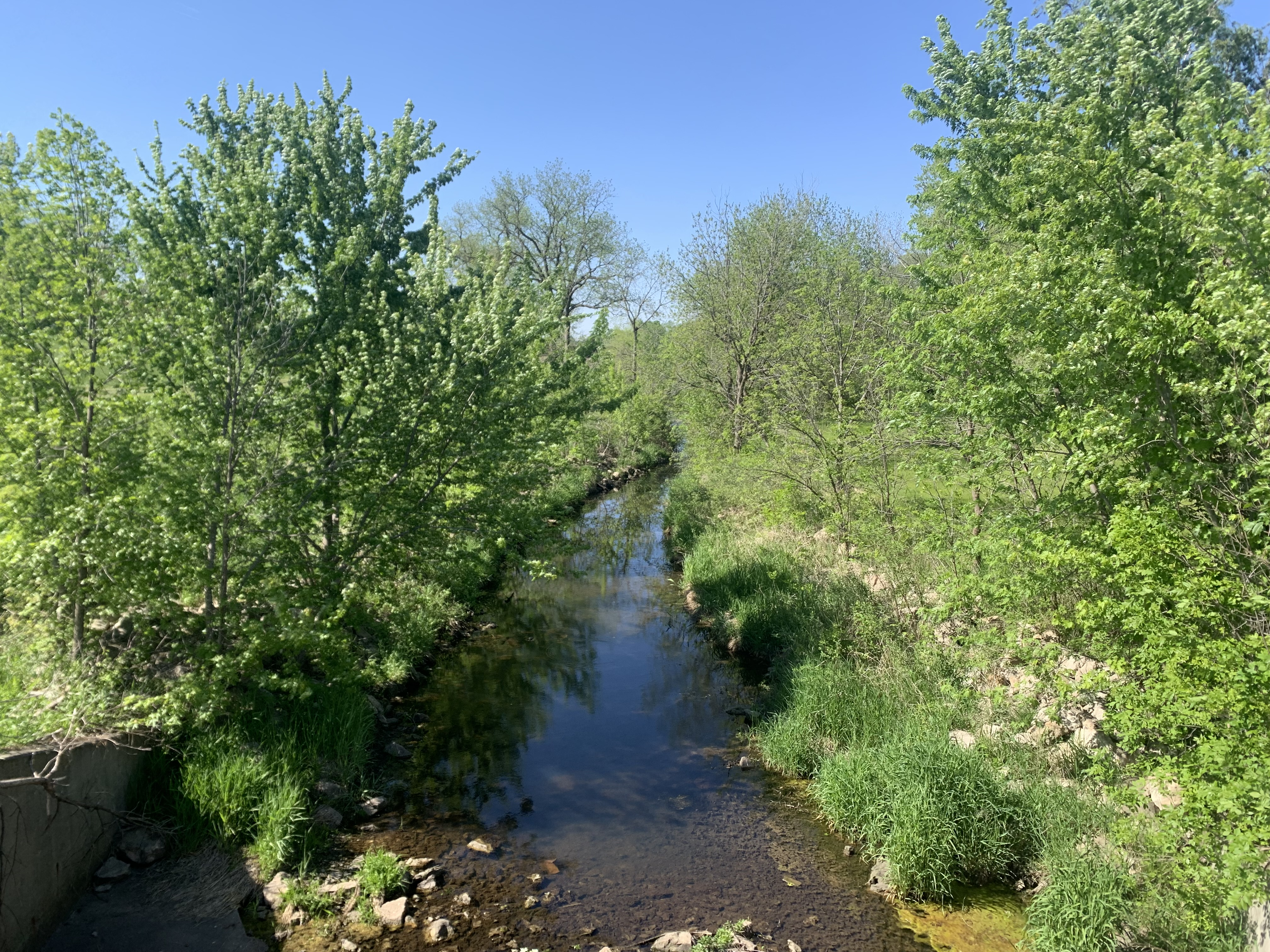
Platte River at 170th St bridge west of Creston, Iowa

=== Adams County, Iowa ===
- Todd Branch
- Saylings Creek
  - Metz Creek
- West Platte River

=== Ringgold County, Iowa ===
- Gard Branch
- Turkey Branch
- Middle Platte River
  - East Platte River
  - East Branch Middle Platte River

=== Worth County, Missouri ===
- Platte Branch

=== Nodaway County, Missouri ===
- Long Branch
  - Cottonwood Creek
- Brushy Creek
- Honey Creek
  - Morgan Branch
  - Hog Branch
  - Wolf Pen Branch
  - Fox Branch

=== Andrew County, Missouri ===
- Niagara Creek
- Crooked Creek
- Agee Creek
- Hickory Creek
- Clear Creek

=== Buchanan County, Missouri ===
- Demoss Branch
- Castile Creek
  - Tributaries of Castile Creek
- Belcher Branch
- Rock Creek
- Pigeon Creek
- Riley Branch
- Third Fork Platte River
  - Tributaries of the Third Fork Platte River
- Candy Creek
- One Hundred and Two River
  - Tributaries of the One Hundred and Two River

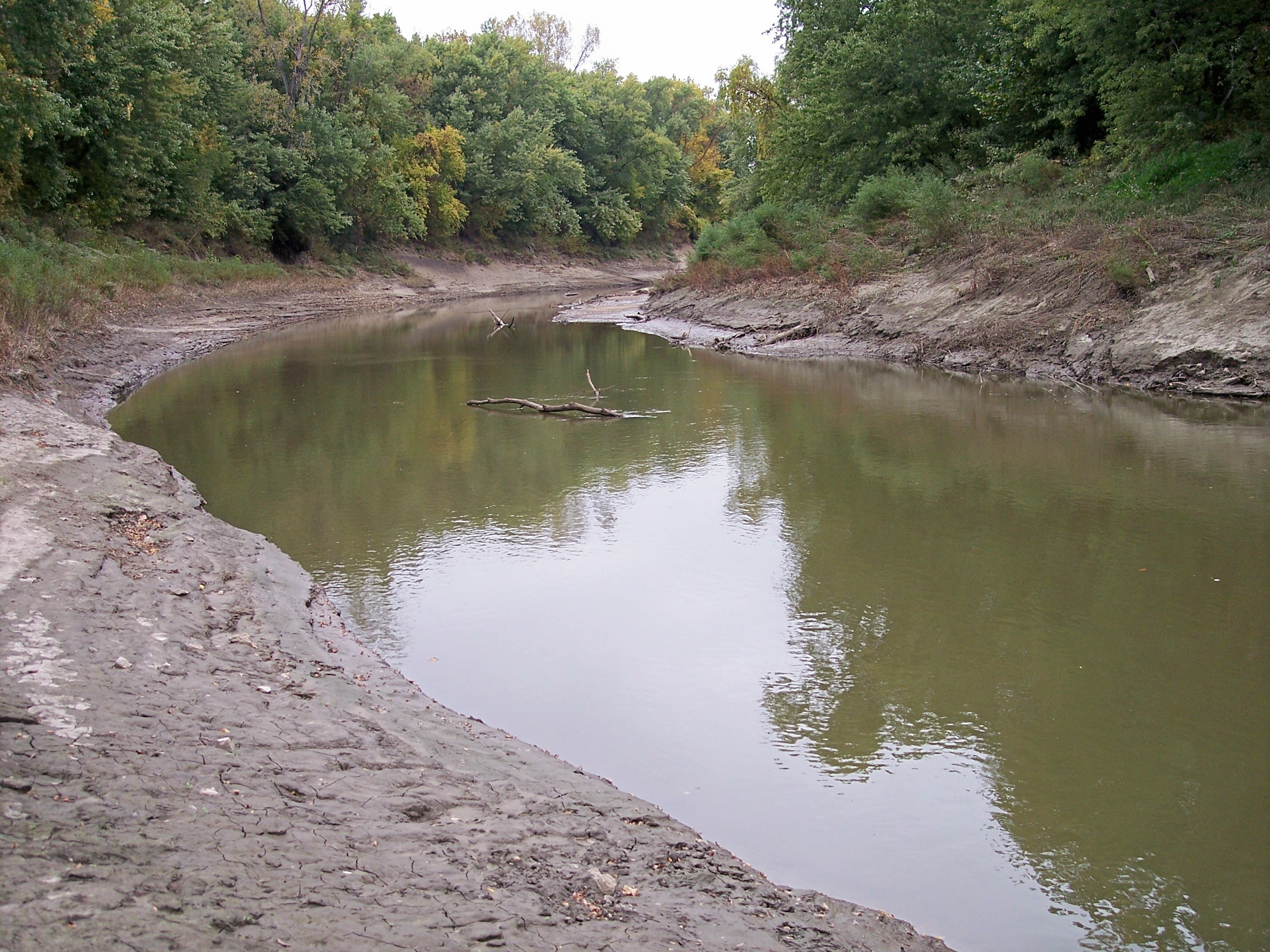
The Platte River near Platte City, Missouri

=== Platte County, Missouri ===
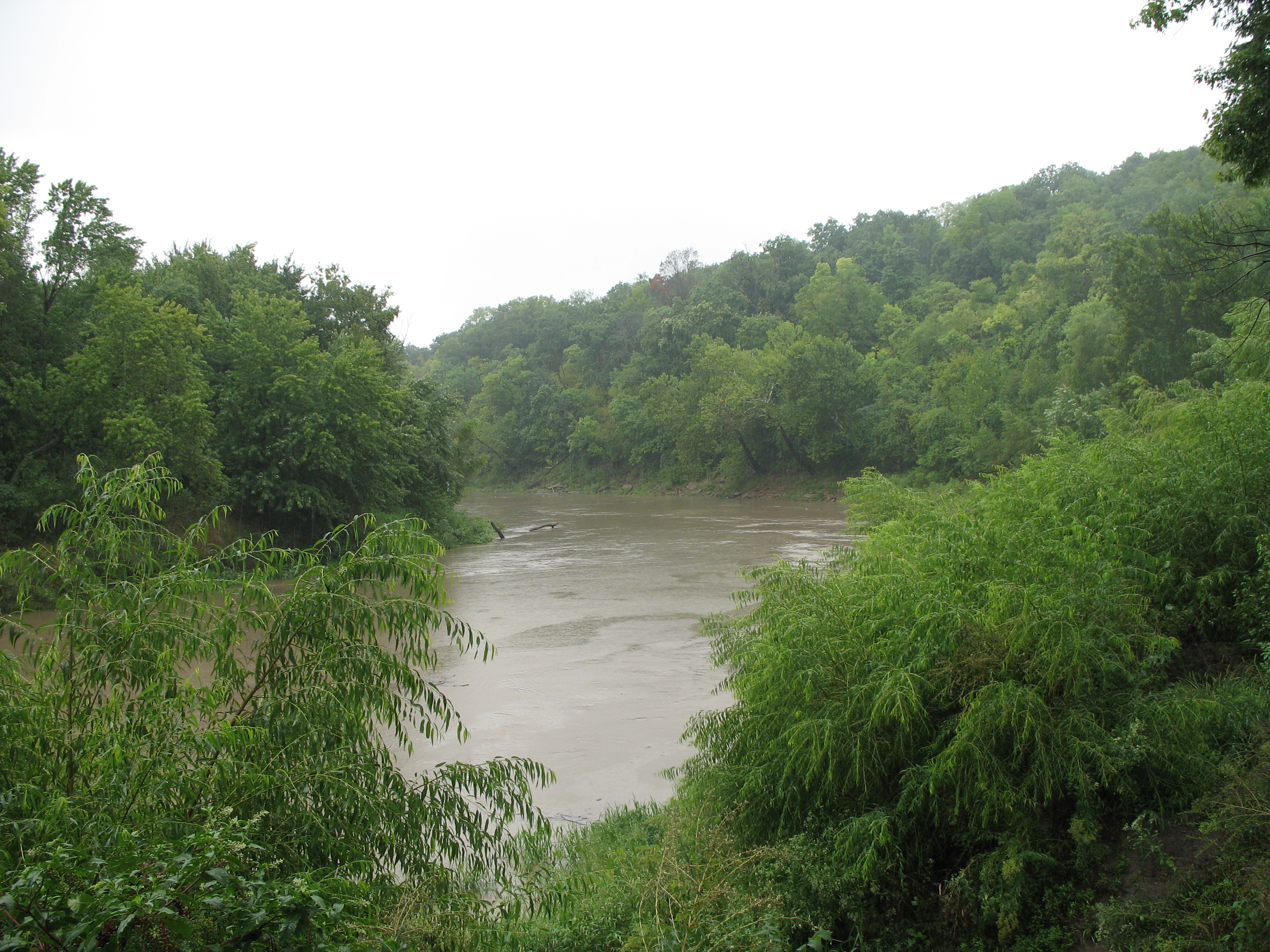
The Platte River near its confluence with the Missouri River at Farley, Missouri

- Martin Hollow
- Farley Branch
- Prairie Creek
  - Sand Branch
  - Fox Creek
    - Big Creek
- Lanter Branch
- Gibson Branch or Broken Bridge Branch
- Hettich Branch or Hettick Branch
- Burckhardt's Branch
- Murray Branch
- Clear Branch
- Jowler Creek
- Little Platte River
  - Tributaries of the Little Platte River
- Alger Creek
- Shanks Branch
- Dicks Creek
  - Owl Creek
- Bell Creek or Duncan Branch
- Grove Creek
- Holland Branch
  - Chestnut Branch
- Mitchell Branch

== See also ==
- List of tributaries of the Missouri River
- List of Iowa rivers
- List of Missouri rivers
