= Defiance, Worth County, Missouri =

Extinct hamlet in northwest Missouri, U.S.

Defiance
- Extinct hamlet
- Location within the state of Missouri
- Coordinates: 40°30′46″N 94°35′56″W
- Country: United States
- State: Missouri
- County: Worth
- Township: Union
- GNIS: 739673

Defiance was a small hamlet in western Worth County, Missouri during the late 19th century.

== Etymology ==
The name comes from the fact that Weaver sold whiskey and defied people to enforce any law against him. Other potential names included Winemiller Mills and Riverside, but the name Defiance was adopted in 1872.

== History ==
=== Formation ===
In 1865, Jacob Winemiller came to the newly formed Worth county, and purchased land in township 66, range 33, section 14, on the banks of the Platte river. After bringing his family, he started a sawmill and lumber business. in 1868, John Weaver started a store nearby, and by 1872 the town was laid out. Winemiller and Issac Davis are considered the founders of the town. Winemiller, the first postmaster of Defiance, proposed the establishment of a post office on May 4th, 1872, it was to be situated along the route from Isadora to Lutzton in Nodaway County. At the formation of the post office, the population was estimated to be 45.

=== Middle years and decline ===
In 1876 an Independent Order of Odd Fellows lodge was started in Defiance. The lodge burned to the ground in 1878, but was rebuilt. By 1882 the town featured 3 blacksmiths, drug and dry goods stores, a shoemaker, carpenter and physician. In 1882 the population was reported as 50. The stage coach that operated between Grant City and Hopkins stopped at Defiance. In 1887 the Chicago, St. Paul and Kansas City Railroad was built through the Platte Valley, and passed Defiance to the west by a half mile. Construction in the new town of Sheridan began in July, and the businesses of Defiance gradually moved west to the new town. The name of the post office was changed (and moved to) Sheridan on June 16th, 1887.

== Geography ==
Defiance was located four miles south of the Iowa-Missouri state line in Union Township on the west bank of the Platte River. It was about 4 miles west of Isadora and 4.5 miles east of Lutzton. It was about one-half mile east of its successor town, Sheridan.
