= Clear Creek Energy Center =

Wind farm in Missouri, U.S.

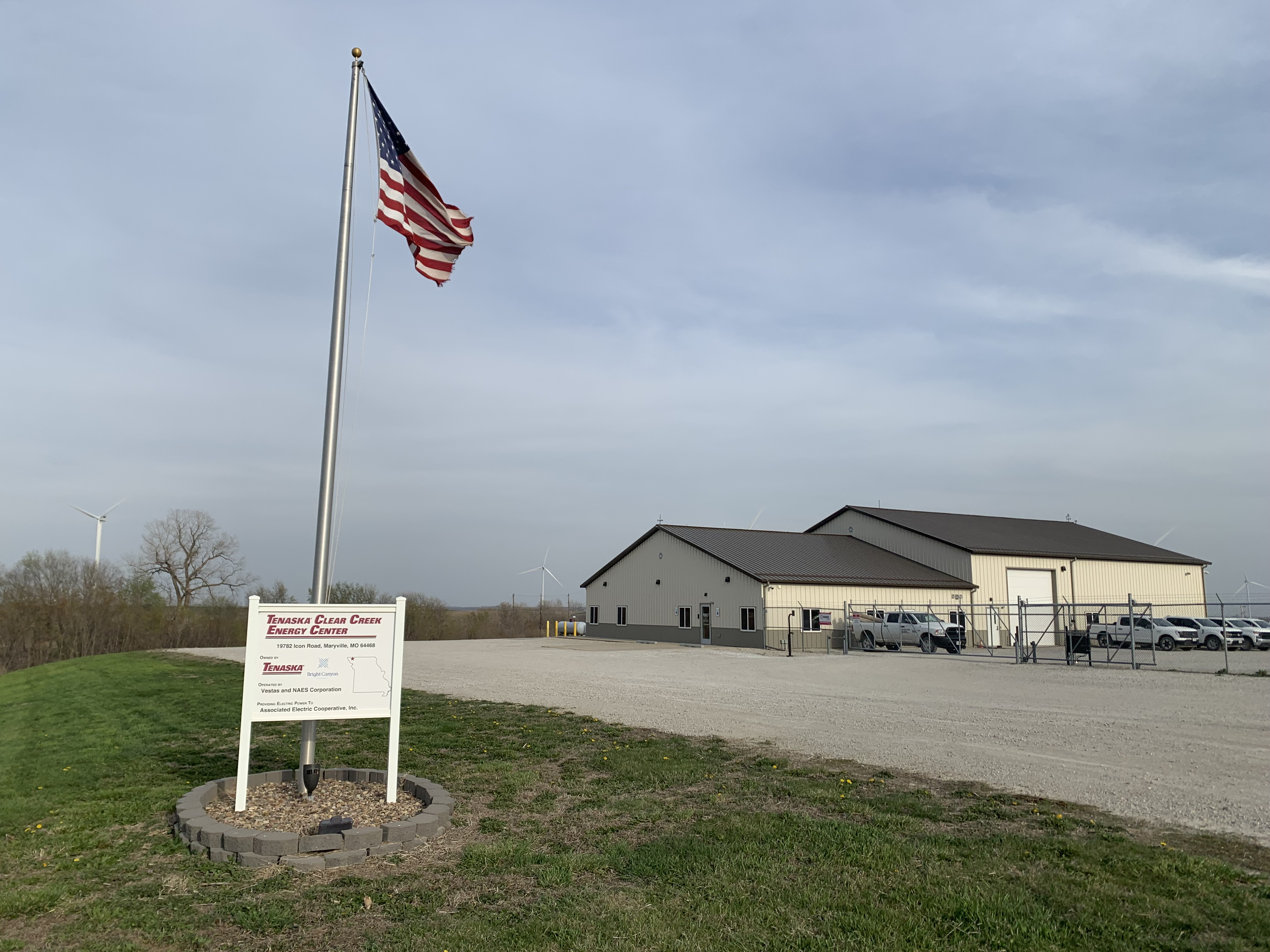
- Headquarters of Clear Creek Energy Center in Union Township
- Country: United States
- Location: Nodaway County, Missouri
- Coordinates: 40°26′03″N 94°53′27″W
- Status: Operational
- Construction began: 2019
- Commission date: 2020
- Construction cost: $300 Million
- Owner: Tenaska
- Operator: North American Energy Services

Wind farm
- Type: Onshore
- Rotor diameter: 110-120m

Power generation
- Units operational: 111
- Make and model: Vestas 2MW & Vestas 2.2MW
- Nameplate capacity: 242 MW

External links
- Website: https://renewables.tenaska.com/case_study/clear-creek/

The Clear Creek Energy Center is a private 242 MW wind farm, located in Nodaway County, Missouri. It contains 111 wind turbines spanning a 31,000-acre area of north of Maryville. The wind farm has two parts: 11 Vestas V110/2000 that are 110m in diameter, and 100 Vestas V120/2200 that are 120m in diameter. The energy center got its name from nearby Clear Creek which flows to its northwest.

== Facility details ==
Tenaska Clear Creek produces energy under a 25-year power purchase agreement with AECI, a Springfield, Missouri based electric cooperative. The turbines were manufactured by Vestas, and the power station was built by Mortenson. Over 350 local area workers were employed to construct it, and the project cost more than $300 million. The operation is supported by 16 local employees, and over 160 landowners collect over $1.2 million in leases from the wind farm.

The wind turbines are located in Atchison, Hopkins, Nodaway, Polk, and Union Townships in Nodaway County, Missouri. The headquarters is located in Union Township about 2.5 miles west-southwest of Pickering.

== See also ==
- Wind power in Missouri
- List of wind farms in the United States
