= Union Township, Missouri =

Union Township, Missouri may refer to one of the following 33 places in the State of Missouri:

- Union Township, Barton County, Missouri
- Union Township, Benton County, Missouri
- Union Township, Bollinger County, Missouri
- Union Township, Cass County, Missouri
- Union Township, Clark County, Missouri
- Union Township, Crawford County, Missouri
- Union Township, Daviess County, Missouri
- Union Township, Dunklin County, Missouri
- Union Township, Franklin County, Missouri
- Union Township, Harrison County, Missouri
- Union Township, Holt County, Missouri
- Union Township, Iron County, Missouri
- Union Township, Jasper County, Missouri
- Union Township, Laclede County, Missouri
- Union Township, Lewis County, Missouri
- Union Township, Lincoln County, Missouri
- Union Township, Marion County, Missouri
- Union Township, Monroe County, Missouri
- Union Township, Nodaway County, Missouri
- Union Township, Perry County, Missouri
- Union Township, Polk County, Missouri
- Union Township, Pulaski County, Missouri
- Union Township, Putnam County, Missouri
- Union Township, Randolph County, Missouri
- Union Township, Ripley County, Missouri
- Union Township, Ste. Genevieve County, Missouri
- Union Township, Scotland County, Missouri
- Union Township, Stone County, Missouri
- Union Township, Sullivan County, Missouri
- Union Township, Washington County, Missouri
- Union Township, Webster County, Missouri
- Union Township, Worth County, Missouri
- Union Township, Wright County, Missouri

== See also ==
- Union Township (disambiguation)
