= Florida Creek =

Stream in northwest Missouri, U.S.

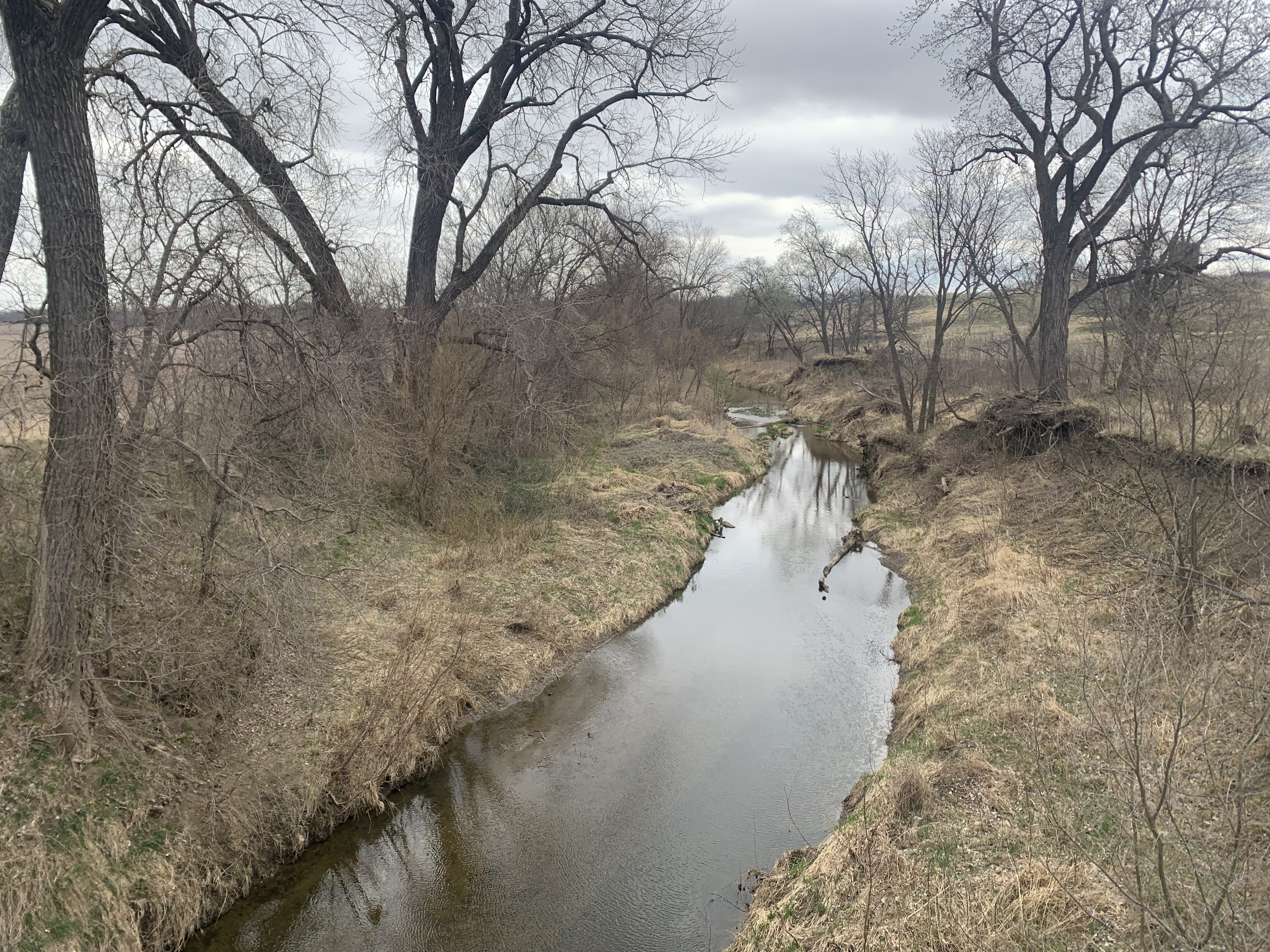
- Florida Creek on the Route 113 bridge northeast of Skidmore

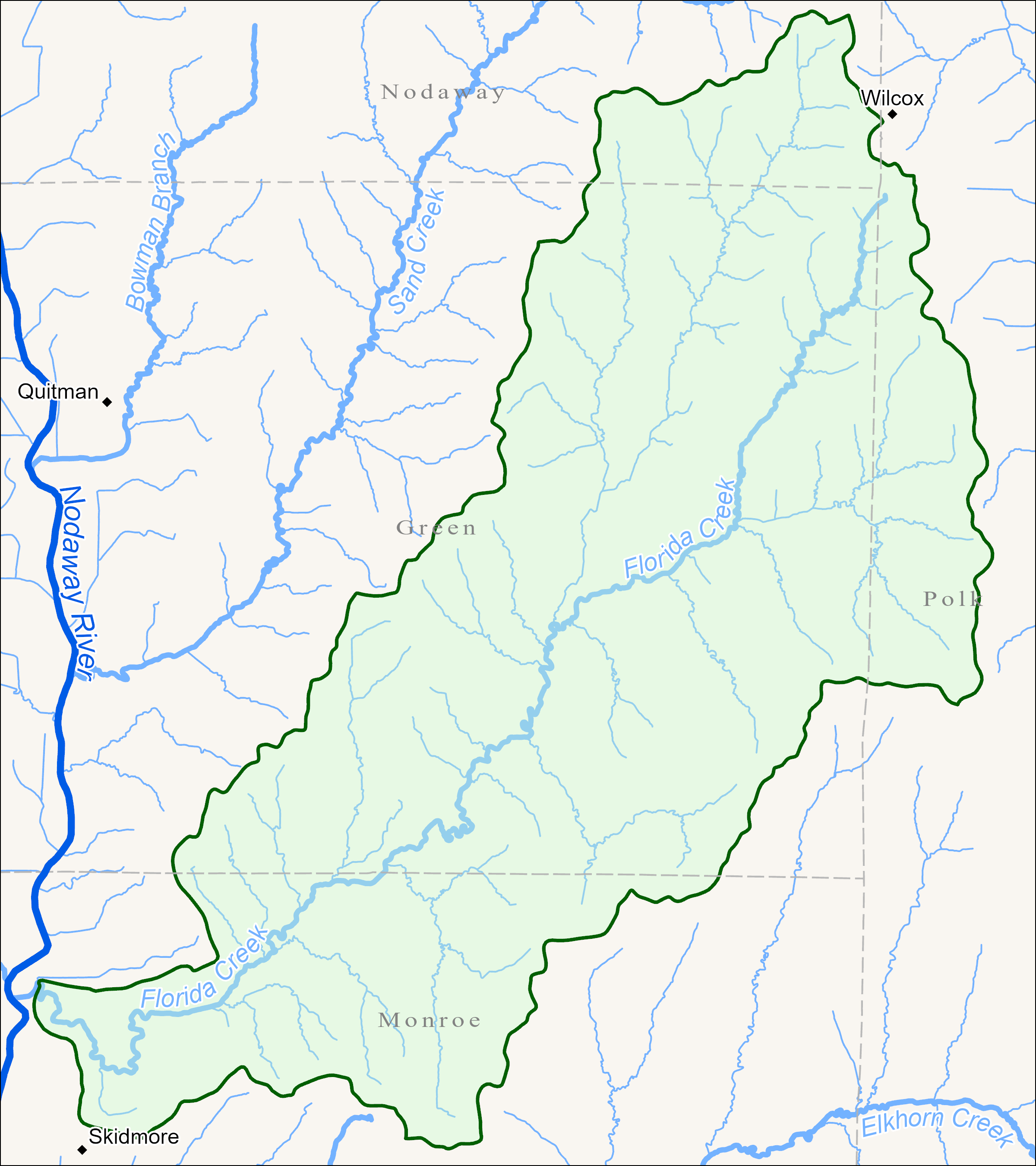
- Watershed of Florida Creek

Location
- Country: United States
- State: Missouri
- County: Nodaway

Physical characteristics
- Source
  - location: Polk Township
  - coordinates: 40°23′25″N 94°57′57″W
  - elevation: 1,115 ft (340 m)
- Mouth: Nodaway River
  - location: Monroe Township
  - coordinates: 40°18′25″N 95°05′02″W
  - elevation: 889 ft (271 m)
- Length: 13.3 mi (21.4 km)
- Basin size: 25.07 sq mi (64.9 km^{2})

Basin features
- Progression: Florida Creek → Nodaway River → Missouri River → Mississippi River → Atlantic Ocean
- Stream gradient 17.5 ft/mi (3.31 m/km)

Florida Creek is a stream in Nodaway County in the U.S. state of Missouri. It is a tributary of the Nodaway River and is 13.3 miles long.

== History ==
It is unknown why the name "Florida Creek" was applied to this stream. Other variant names include Bank Creek and Buggs Creek, though it is not clear whether this latter name only applied to neighboring Bagby Creek.

A 1903 map shows a park named Florida Park along the Florida Creek northeast of Skidmore.

== Geography ==
Florida Creek is a left tributary of the Nodaway River and joins it 36.4 miles before its mouth in the Missouri River. Wilcox is located on the northern divide of this watershed and that of South Fork Clear Creek.

=== Course ===
Florida Creek begins in the far west portion of Polk Township near US 71 highway just south of Wilcox. The stream enters Green Township and travels southwesterly through it. It is crossed by Route 46 about halfway through its course. Florida Creek continues southwest, enters Monroe Township and heads towards Skidmore. In its last mile, the stream turns west and is crossed by Route 113 and passes north by Skidmore before its confluence with the Nodaway River.

=== Crossings ===
Florida Creek is crossed by three highways: Route 46, 113, and AB.

== See also ==
- Tributaries of the Nodaway River
- List of rivers of Missouri
