= Bedison, Missouri =

Extinct hamlet in Missouri, U.S.

Coordinates: 40°17′36″N 94°46′28″W

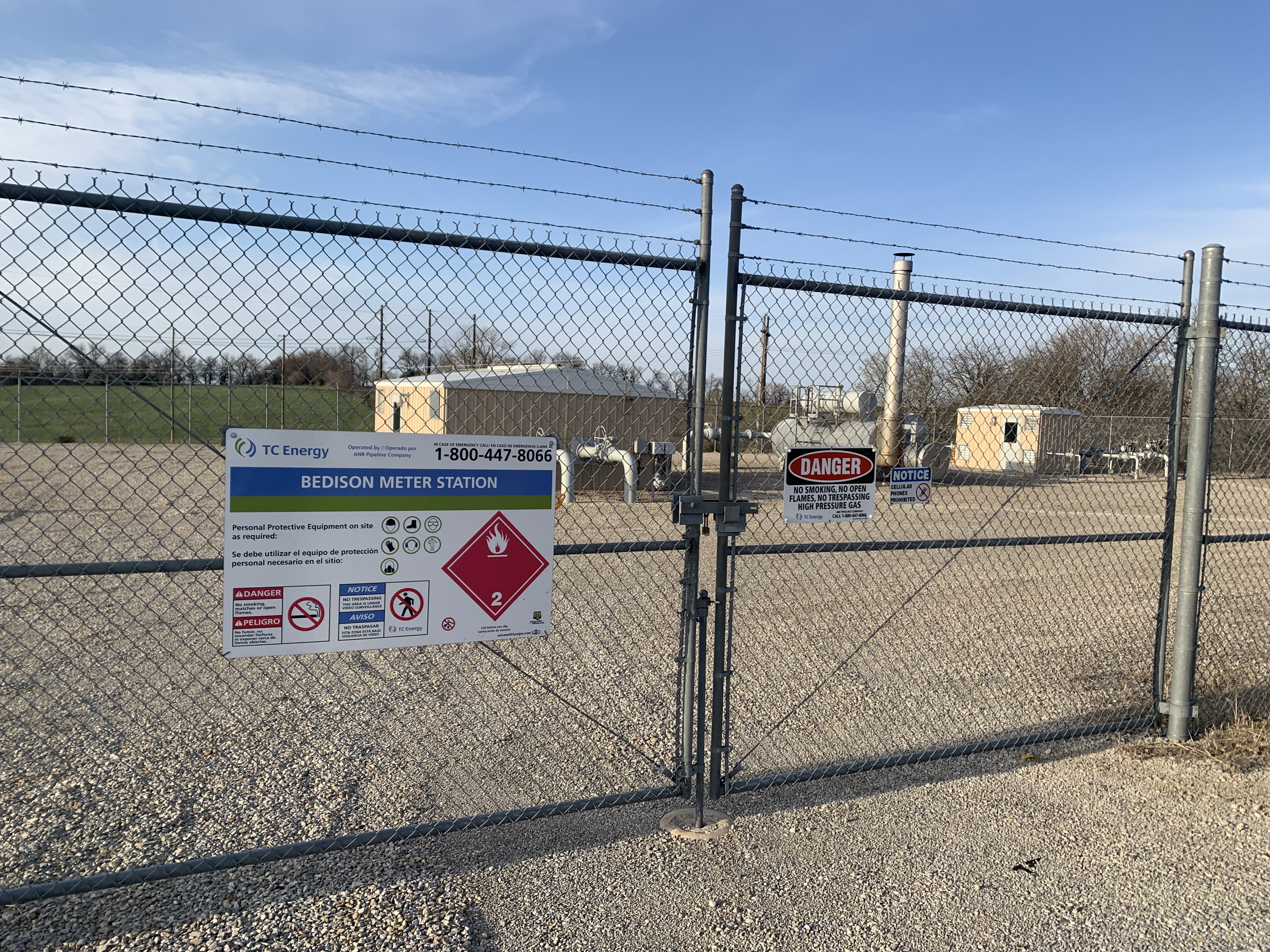
Bedison Meter Station southwest of where Bedison was.

Bedison is an extinct hamlet in central Nodaway County, in the U.S. state of Missouri.

== History ==
Bedison was platted with four blocks in southeastern Grant Township along the Wabash Line and the rail-station there was called Calla. The first post office, Valentine, was present from 1881 to 1889, then the name changed to Bedison, and remained in operation until 1942. It is unknown why the name "Bedison" was applied to this community.

== Geography ==
Bedison was located about 6 miles southeast of Maryville between Mozingo Creek and Long Branch.
