= Allison, Missouri =

Extinct community in Missouri, U.S.

Coordinates: 40°32′44″N 94°42′24″W

Allison is an extinct community in northeastern Nodaway County, in the U.S. state of Missouri.

== History ==
A post office called Allison was established in 1883, and it remained in operation until 1901, whereafter the mail delivery moved to Hopkins. The community had the name of an early settler.

== Geography ==
Allison was located in northern Independence Township about 3 miles (4.8 km) northwest of Luteston, 5 miles (8.0 km) north of Gaynor, and 5.5 miles (8.9 km) east of Hopkins.
