= Wind power in Missouri =

Electricity from wind in one U.S. state

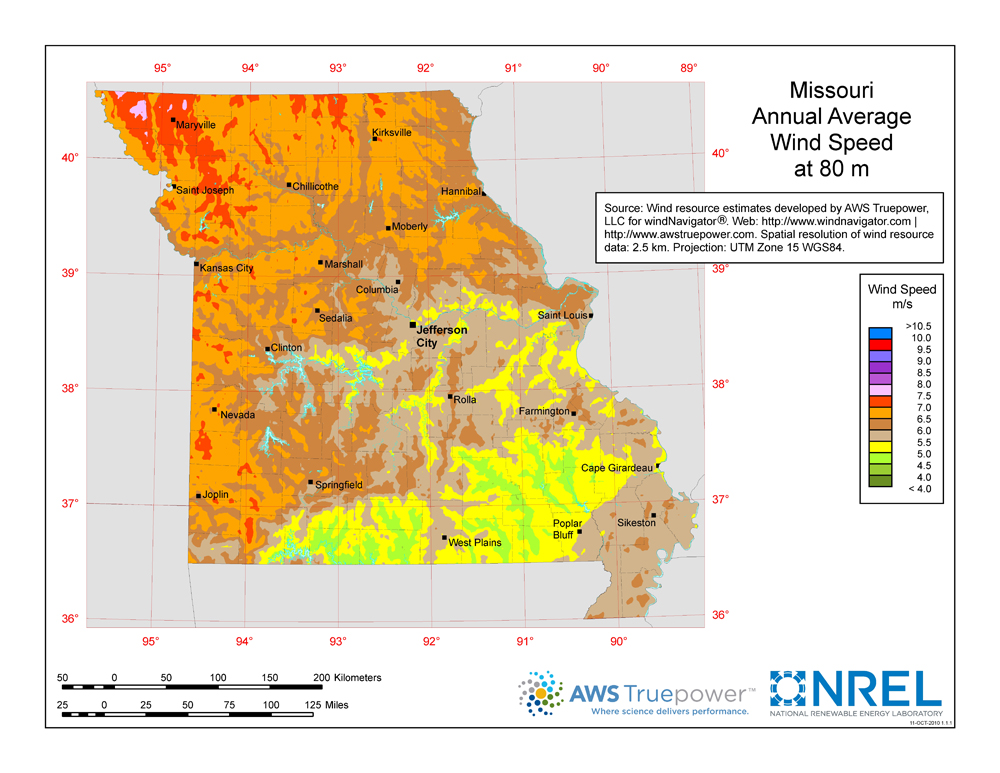
Missouri 80-meter wind resource map

Wind power in Missouri has an installed capacity of 959 MW from 499 turbines, as of 2016. This provided 1.29% of the state's electricity production.

Missouri's total wind generation potential is estimated to be 340 GW.

== Installed capacity ==
As of 2016, Missouri had 959 MW of installed capacity, all installed in the north-west corner of the state. At least six wind farms were developed by Wind Capital Group between 2006 and 2009. As of 2017, the largest wind farm in the state had come online, the 300 MW Rock Creek Wind Farm in Atchison County.

Northwest Missouri is considered the windiest portion of the state, and clips the windiest portion of the country, which is known as Tornado Alley.

Missouri wind generating capacity by year
Megawatts of generating capacity

Missouri wind generation by year
Million kilowatt-hours of electricity

Project	County	City	Turbines	Nominal power (MW)	Commissioned	Notes
Bluegrass Ridge	Gentry	King City	27	56.7	2008	Developed by Wind Capital Group (now owned by Exelon). Wind Capital's founder is Tom Carnahan, son of Missouri Governor Mel Carnahan and U.S. Senator Jean Carnahan.
Clear Creek Energy Center	Nodaway	Maryville	111	242	2020	Developed by Tenaska with lease by Associated Electric Cooperative in Springfield to provide power for rural electric cooperatives in Missouri, Iowa and Oklahoma.
Conception	Nodaway	Conception	24	50.4	2008	Developed by Wind Capital Group (now owned by Exelon)
Cow Branch	Atchison	Rockport	24	50.4	2008	Developed by Wind Capital Group (now owned by Exelon)
Farmers City	Atchison	Westboro	73	146.0	2009	Owned by and developed by Iberdrola Renovables.
High Prairie	Adair, Schuyler	Marshfield, Seymour	175	400	2020	Project started by Terra-Gen LLC., currently owned by Ameren since December 2020. Taken offline from 2024-2025 due to the collapse of three turbines.
Loess Hills	Atchison	Rockport	4	5.0	2008	First city in US to get its total power from wind. Developed by Wind Capital Group (now owned by Exelon).
Lost Creek Ridge	DeKalb	Union Star	100	150.0	2011	Developed by Wind Capital Group and later sold to Pattern Energy.
Osborn	Dekalb	Osborn	88	176.0	2016	Developed and owned by NextEra Energy.
Rock Creek	Atchison	York	150	300.0	2017	Largest in Missouri and cost $500 million. Owned and developed by Enel Green Power (after acquisition in 2019 of Kansas-based Tradewind Energy).
White Cloud	Nodaway	Maryville	89	236.5	2020	Owned and developed by Enel Green Power. 11 Vestas and 78 Siemens Gamesa turbines. Cost was $380 million.

== Transmission capacity ==
There have been several attempts at getting regulatory approval of transmission lines to carry wind power, either to the load centers of Missouri, or through Missouri, from major wind power producers in the Great Plains states to load centers further east.

=== Completed ===
- The Midwest Transmission Project is a 180-mile 345-kV transmission line which became active in 2017 It connects the Omaha Public Power District (at its Nebraska City, Nebraska substation with the Kansas City Power & Light substation at Sibley, Missouri and has one major substation in Maryville, Missouri. The line was not specifically designed to supplement the wind grid but the FAQ notes it "will create opportunities for existing and new future wind energy to access to the regional transmission system." It is a priority project of the Southwest Power Pool.
- The Mark Twain Transmission Project was proposed by Ameren to connect Palmyra, Kirksville and Iowa. Approval was given for construction by each of the counties the transmission lines passed through, and the line was energized in January 2020.

=== Proposed ===
- The Grain Belt Express is a proposed 4 GW transmission line from western Kansas to Indiana. The Missouri Public Service Commission twice rejected the proposal, initially due to questions of the benefits of the project to the state, and later due to a lack of assent from all counties. The Missouri Eastern District Court of Appeals ruled the commission erred in its second rejection, but sent the case to the Missouri Supreme Court. The company was awarded the right to use eminent domain for the necessary easments to complete the project, but asserted that most had been acquired through negotiations with landowners. The Department of Energy awarded the project a $4.9 billion conditional loan guarantee in late 2024. This loan guarantee was later canceled in 2025, though the project was reported as continuing with private financing as of September 2025.

== Planned growth ==
In October 2017, the Empire District Electric Company proposed installing 500 MW of wind turbines in Jasper, Barton, Dade, and Lawrence counties.

In February 2019, E.ON announced plans for a 150 MW wind farm northwest of Columbia, Missouri in rural Boone County.

== See also ==
- Solar power in Missouri
- Wind power in the United States
- Renewable energy in the United States
- List of wind farms in the United States
- List of HVDC projects
