= Long Branch (Platte River tributary) =

Stream in Missouri, U.S.

Long Branch North Branch
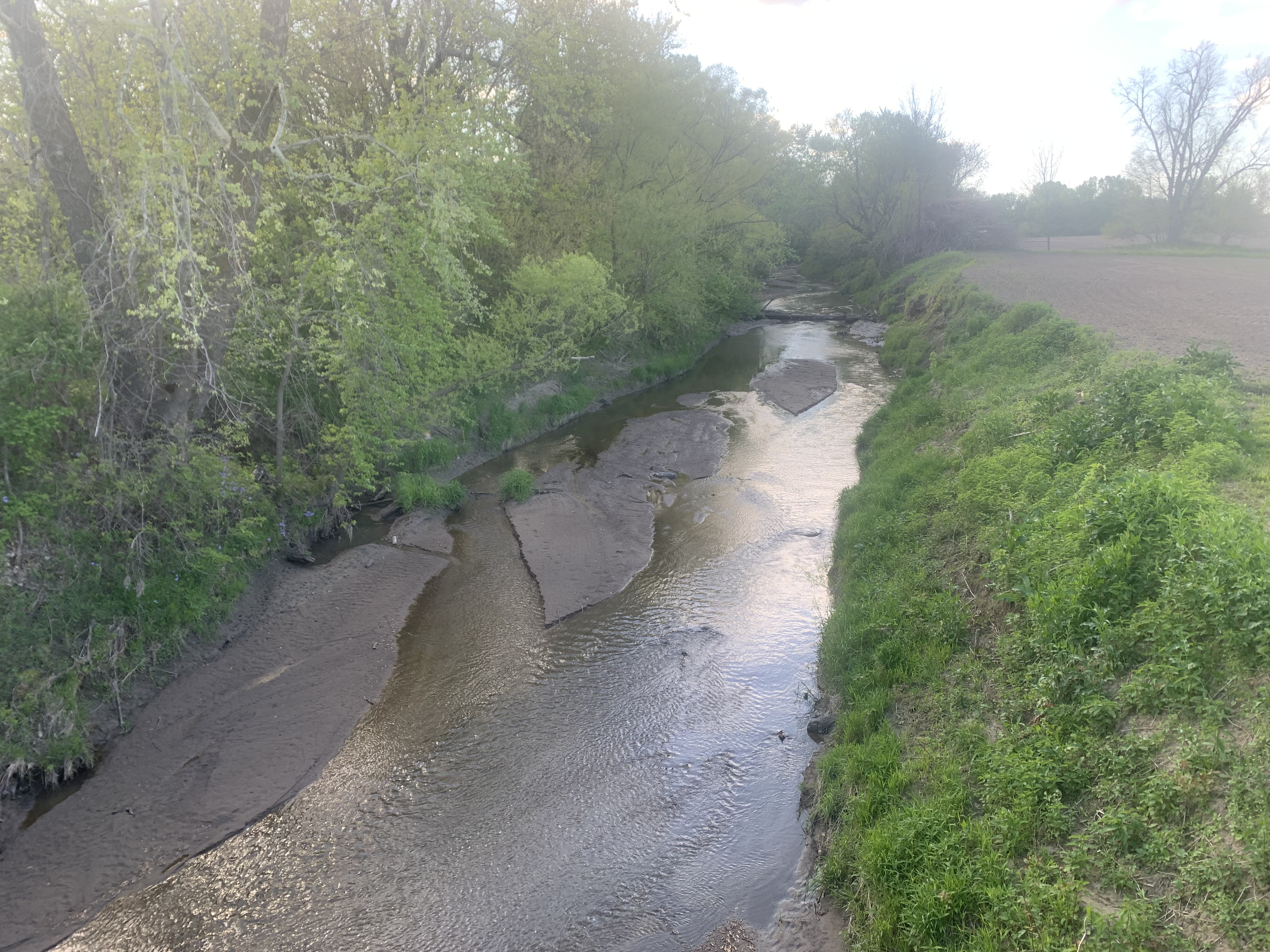
- Long Branch at Lion Road bridge southwest of Guilford

Location
- Country: United States
- State: Missouri
- County: Nodaway

Physical characteristics
- Source
  - location: Independence Township, Nodaway County
  - coordinates: 40°29′06″N 94°43′08″W
  - elevation: 1,150 ft (350 m)
- Mouth: Platte River
  - location: Washington Township, Nodaway County
  - coordinates: 40°09′04″N 94°44′34″W
  - elevation: 928 ft (283 m)
- Length: 31.2 mi (50.2 km)

Basin features
- Progression: Long Branch → Platte River → Missouri River → Mississippi River → Atlantic Ocean

Long Branch is a stream in eastern Nodaway county in the State of Missouri. It is a tributary of the Platte River and is 31.2 miles (50.2 km) long.

Initially, North Branch was the more common name for the stream. and persisted until the 20th century, but the name Long Branch was also extant.

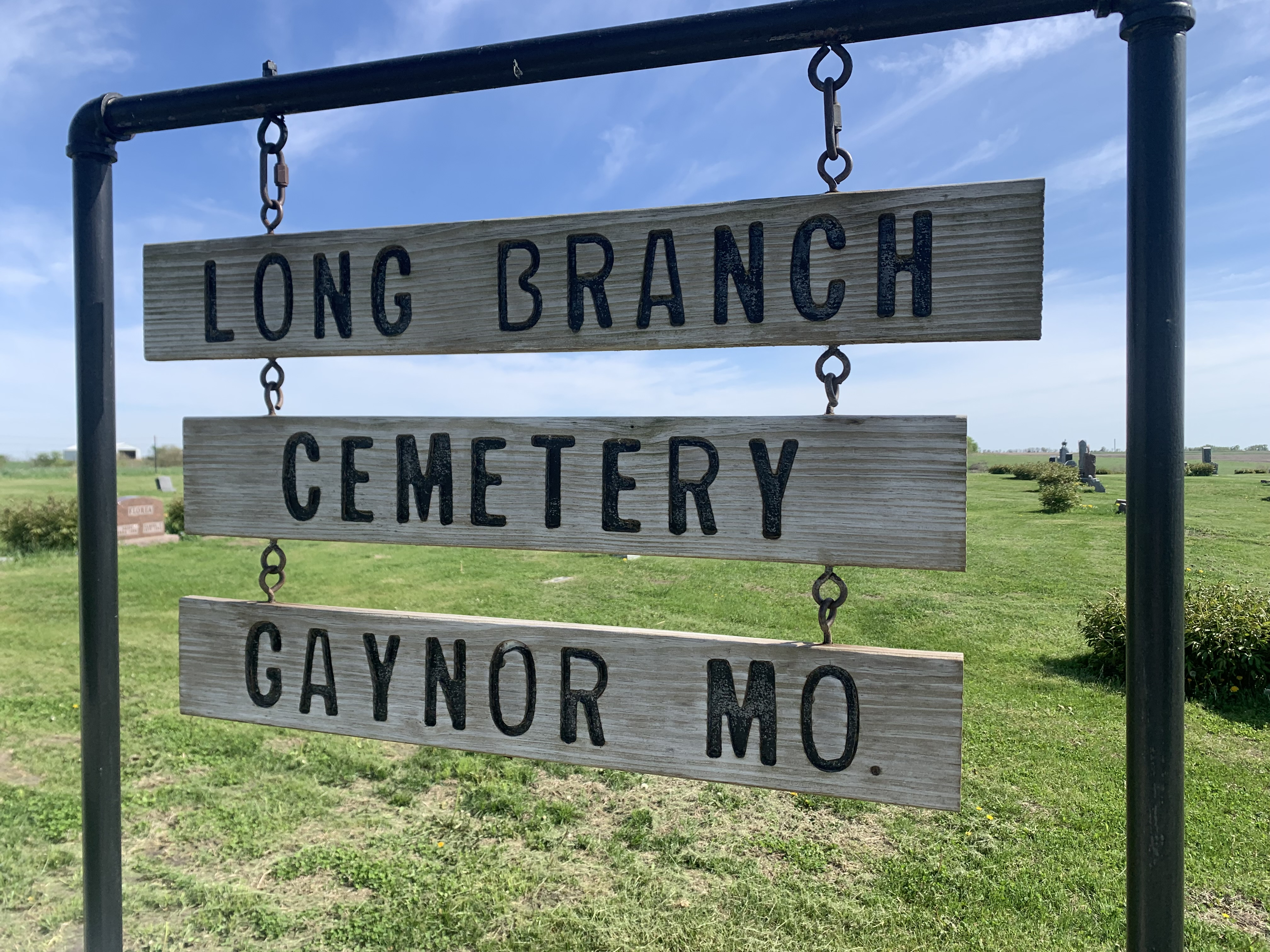
Long Branch Cemetery west of Gaynor

The stream begins just west of Gaynor and flows almost exactly south for most of its course. No settlements are located along the stream, and it is crossed US Route 136 approximately halfway through its course.

There is one named tributary named Cottonwood Creek located in the southern part of the stream's course between Barnard and Arkoe.

There is a cemetery in Independence Township, located just west of Gaynor near the stream's headwaters, named Long Branch Cemetery.

== See also ==
- Tributaries of the Platte River
- List of rivers of Missouri
