= Solar power in Missouri =

Overview of solar power in the U.S. state of Missouri

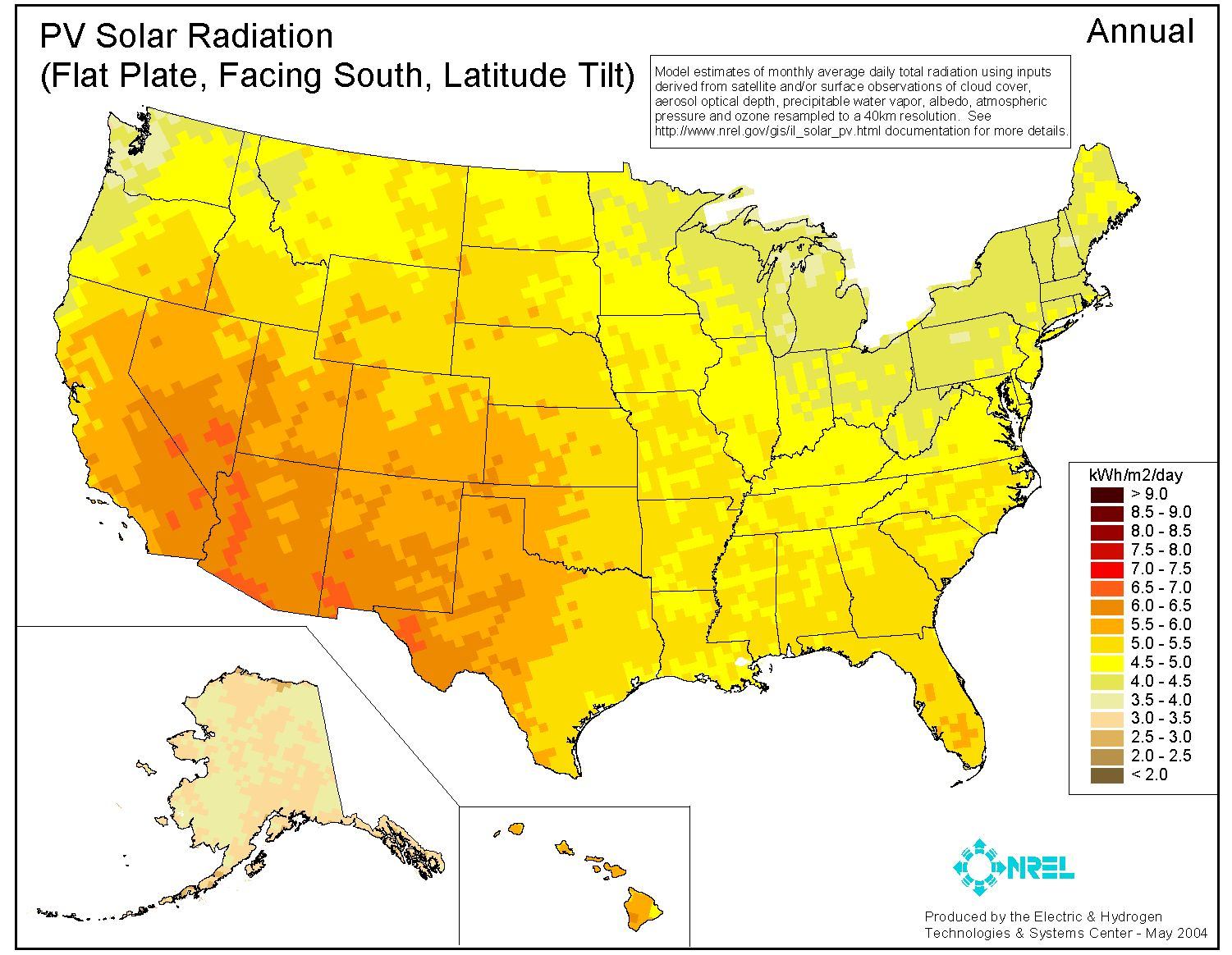
Solar potential in the United States

Solar power in Missouri has been a growing industry since the early 2010s. Solar power is capable of generating 42.7% of the electricity used in Missouri from rooftop solar panels totaling 28,300 MW.

Net metering is available only during a billing period. Excess generation is credited at avoided cost rate, and lost if any remains after a year, giving the state a B rating.

IKEA installed a 1.28-MW solar array on its St. Louis store which was the largest rooftop installation in the state. It was completed in July 2015.

Missouri's largest solar farm is located in Christian County, just outside of Nixa on a plot owned by Gardener Capital. The farm generates 9% of the power needs of Nixa's transmission grid.

== Statistics ==
Missouri solar generating capacity by year
Megawatts of generating capacity

Missouri solar generation by year
Thousand megawatt-hours of electricity

== See also ==
- Wind power in Missouri
- Solar power in the United States
- Renewable energy in the United States
