= Union Township, Nodaway County, Missouri =

Township in Nodaway County, Missouri, U.S.

Union Township
- Township
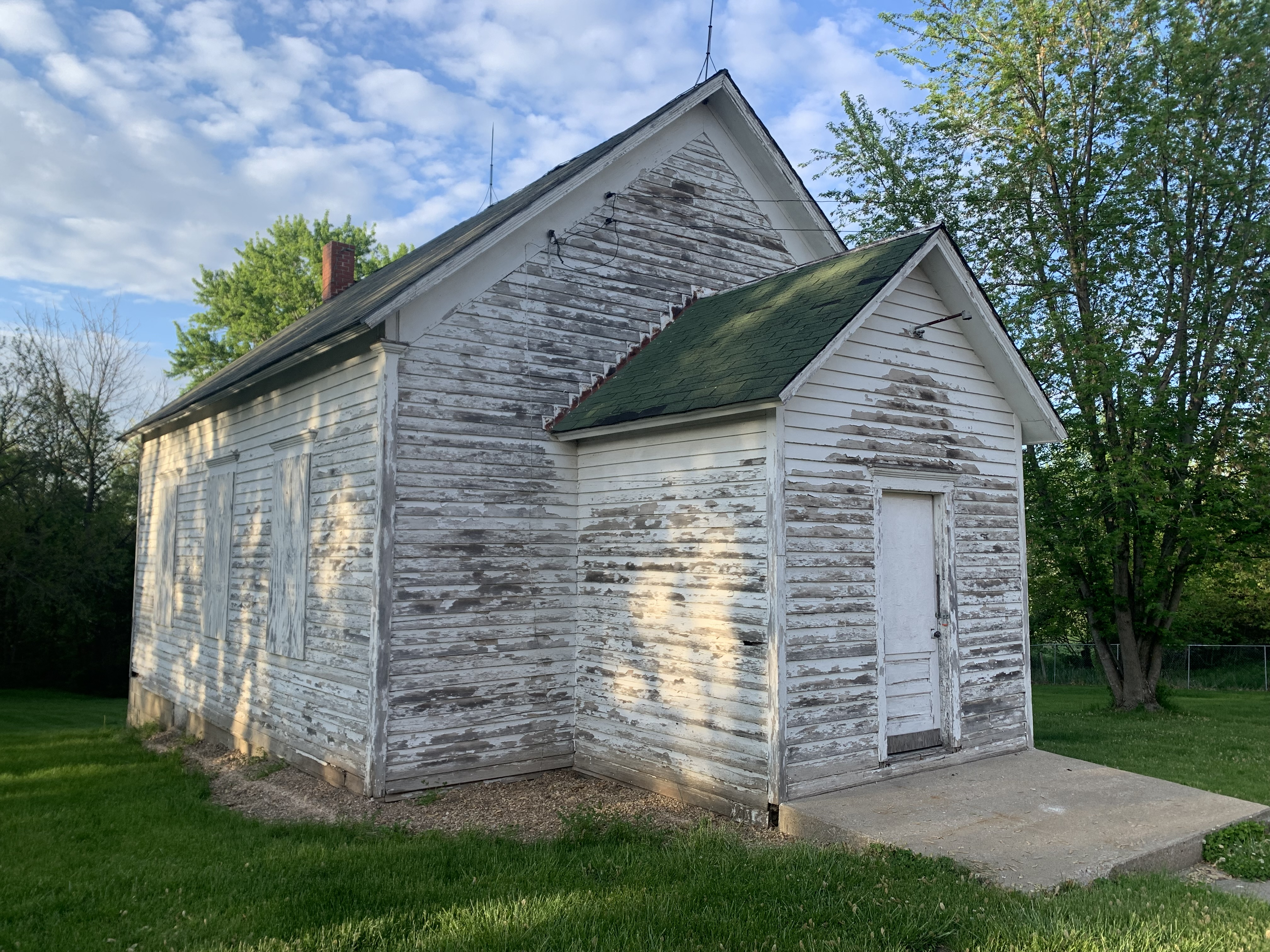
- Bloomdale Schoolhouse originally southeast of Pickering, now removed to Pickering

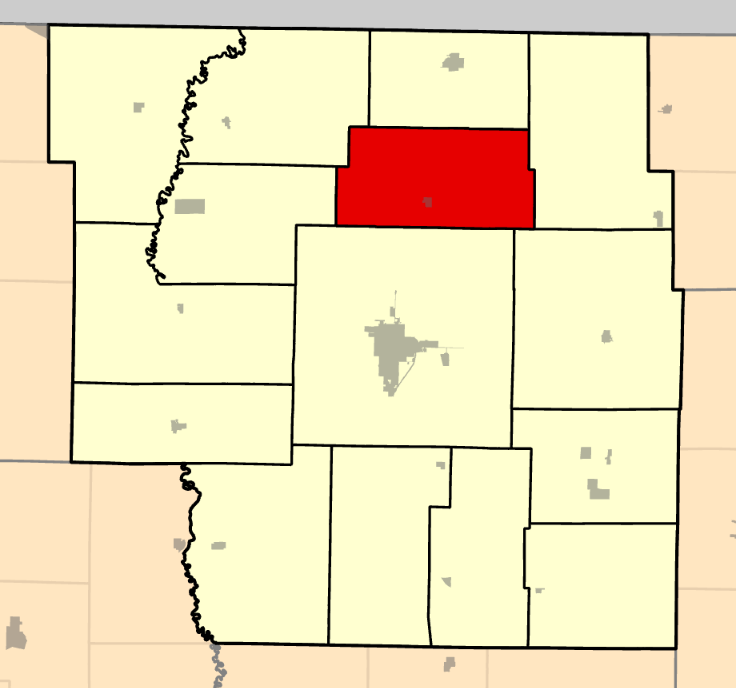
- Coordinates: 40°28′05″N 94°50′09″W
- Country: United States
- State: Missouri
- County: Nodaway
- Erected: 1856

Area
  - Total: 47.45 sq mi (122.9 km^{2})
  - Land: 47.39 sq mi (122.7 km^{2})
  - Water: 0.06 sq mi (0.16 km^{2}) 0.13%
- Elevation: 1,010 ft (310 m)

Population (2020)
  - Total: 441
  - Density: 9.3/sq mi (3.6/km^{2})
- FIPS code: 29-14774824
- GNIS feature ID: 767096

Union Township is a township in Nodaway County, Missouri, United States. At the 2020 census, its population was 441. It contains 48 sections.

== History ==
Union Township was established in May 1856 when the northern portion of Polk Township was split off because of a court order. In 1871, Hopkins Township was created out of it.

== Geography ==
The village of Pickering is located south of the center, a mile west of the One Hundred and Two River and seven miles north of Maryville.

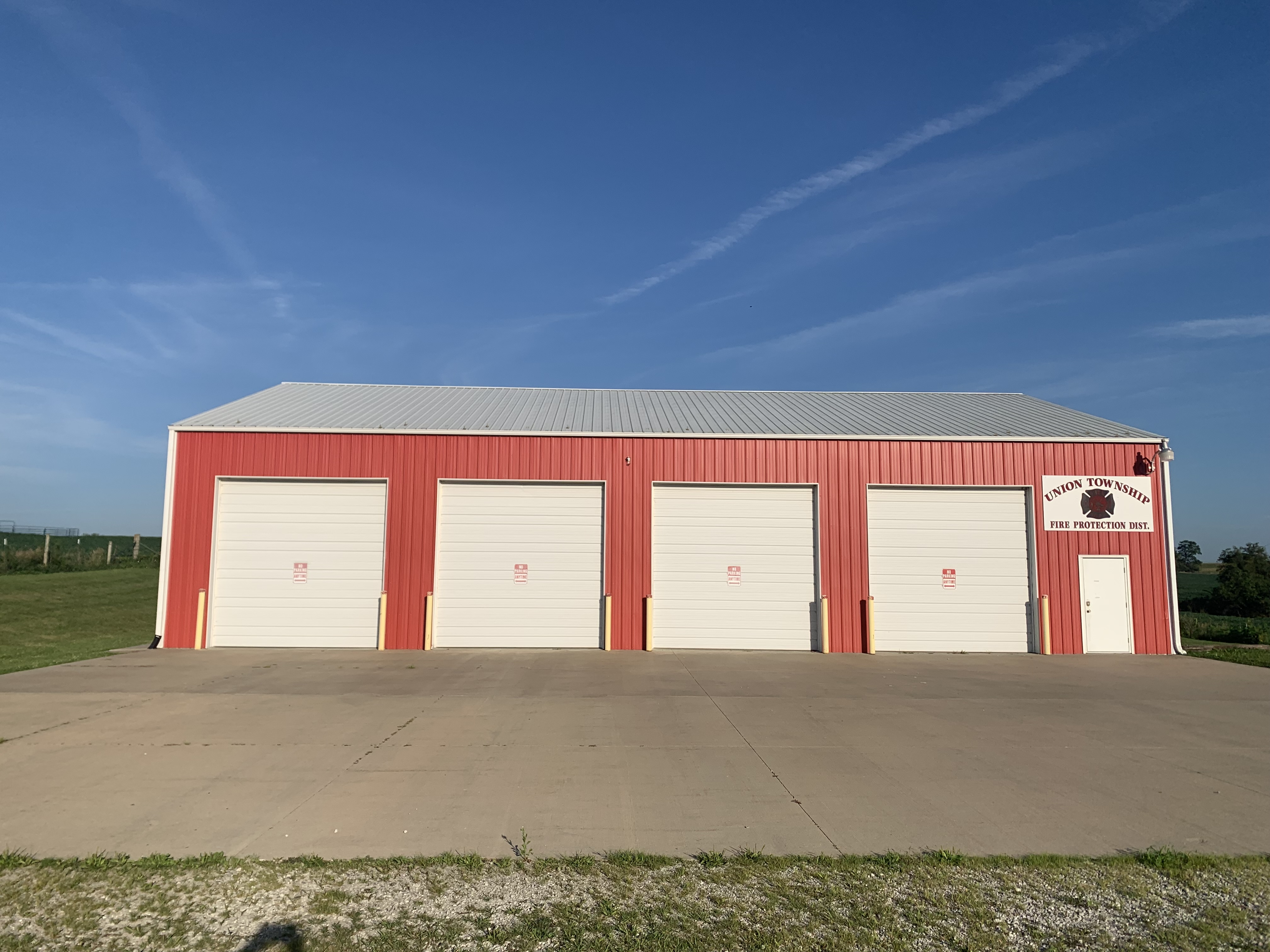
Union Township Fire Department in Pickering, Missouri

== Transportation ==
The following highways travel through the township:

- Route 148
- Route B
- Route EE
- Route FF
- Route NN
- Route OO
