= Isadora, Missouri =

Unincorporated community in Worth County, Missouri, United States

- Unincorporated community
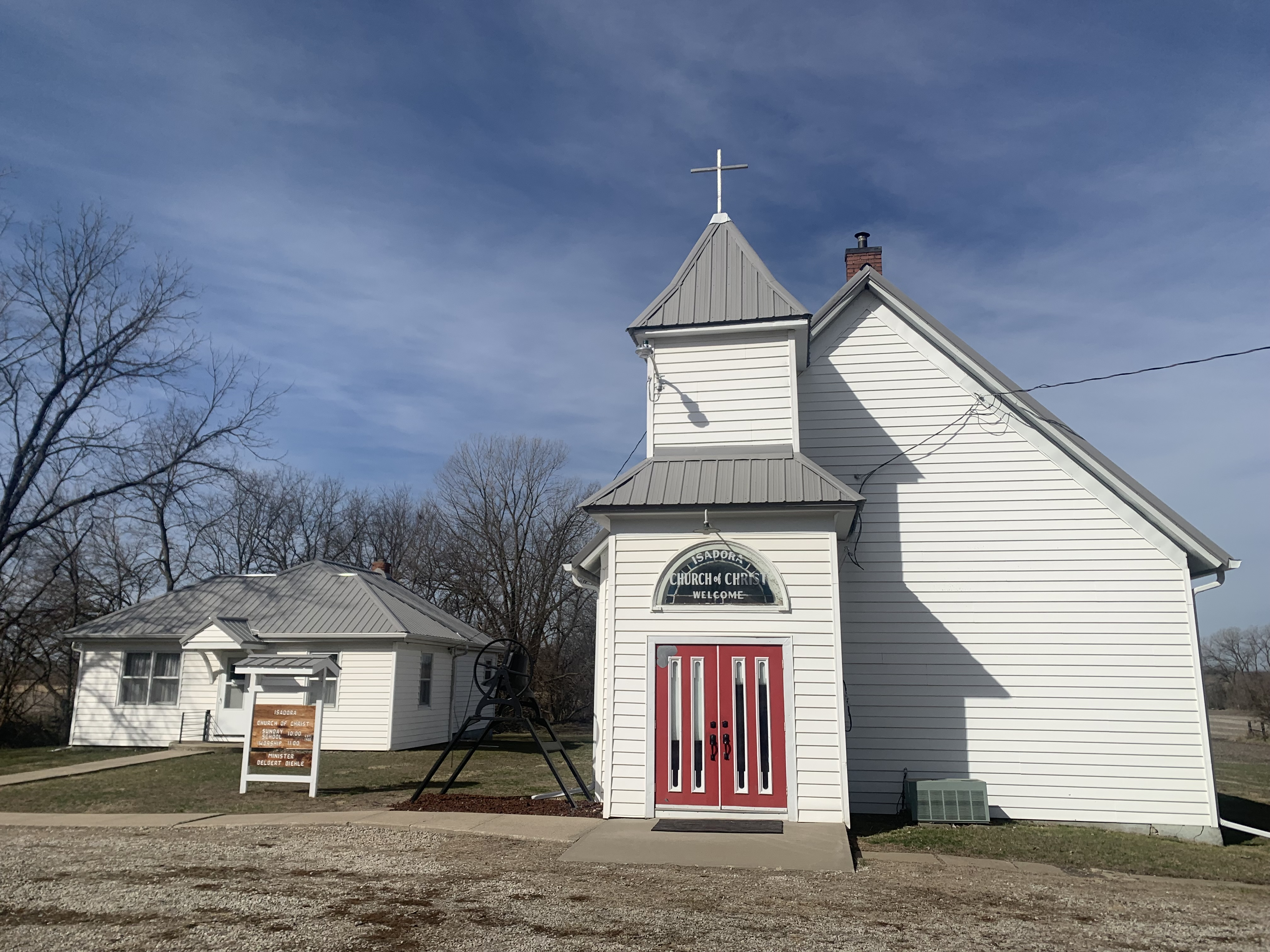
- Church of Christ at Isadora, March 2025

- Location within Missouri
- Coordinates: 40°31′33″N 94°31′04″W
- Country: United States
- State: Missouri
- County: Worth
- Township: Union
- Elevation: 978 ft (298 m)
- Time zone: UTC-6 (Central (CST))
  - Summer (DST): UTC-5 (CDT)
- Area code: 660
- GNIS feature ID: 730122

Isadora is an unincorporated community in northwest Worth County, Missouri, United States.

== Description ==
Isadora is on Missouri Route A, 6 miles (9.7 km) northwest of Grant City and 5 miles (8.0 km) east of Sheridan. =The community is on the floodplain of the Grand River and is three miles (4.8 km) south of the Missouri–Iowa state line.

== History ==
Isadora was platted in 1863. A post office called Isadora was established in 1866, and remained in operation until 1951. According to tradition, the community was named after the wife of a pioneer man who paid a visit to the area. The population in the 1870s was about 150.
