= Independence Township, Nodaway County, Missouri =

Township in Nodaway County, Missouri, U.S.

Independence Township
- Township
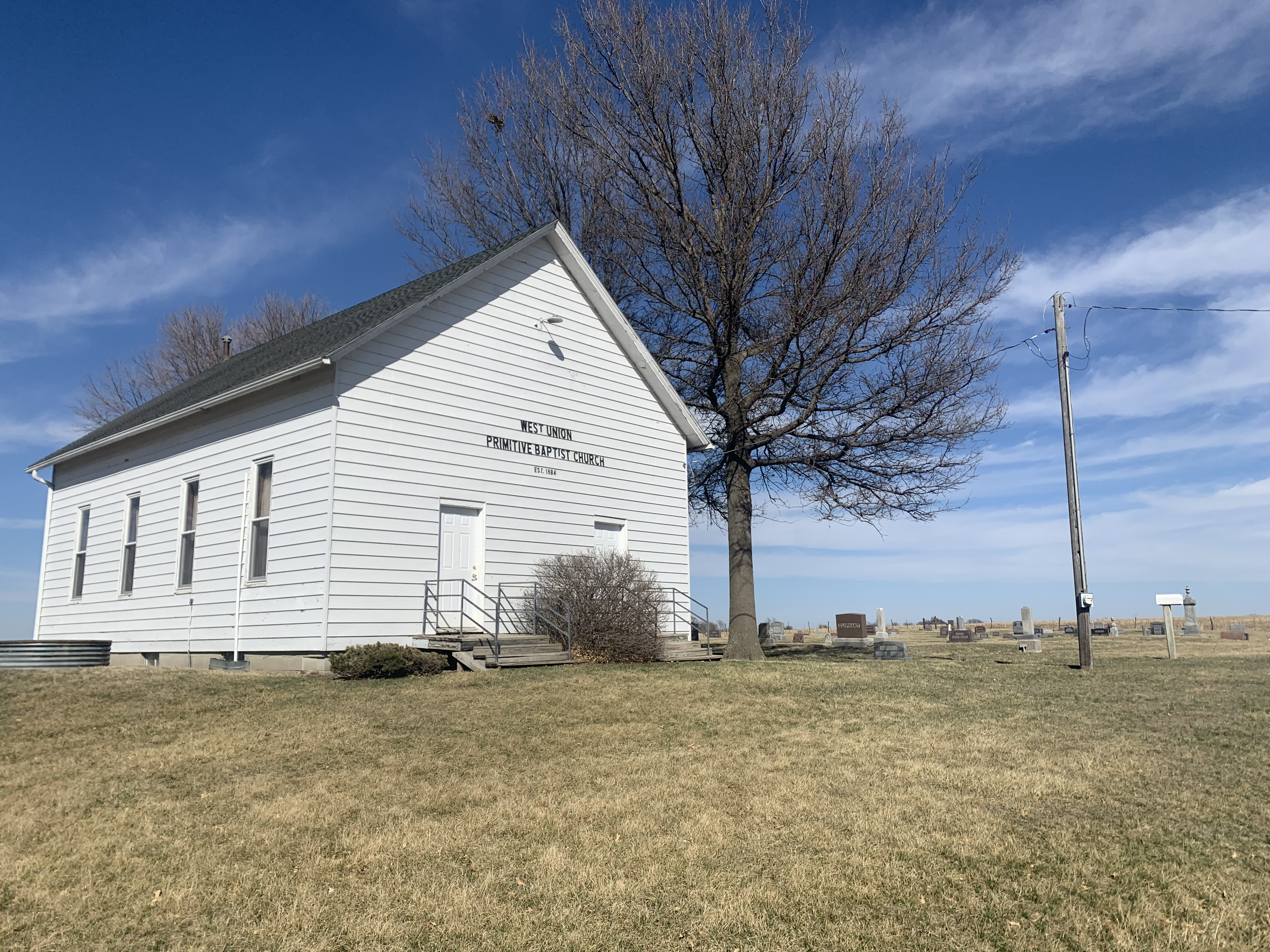
- West Union Church and Cemetery at Orrsburg, Missouri

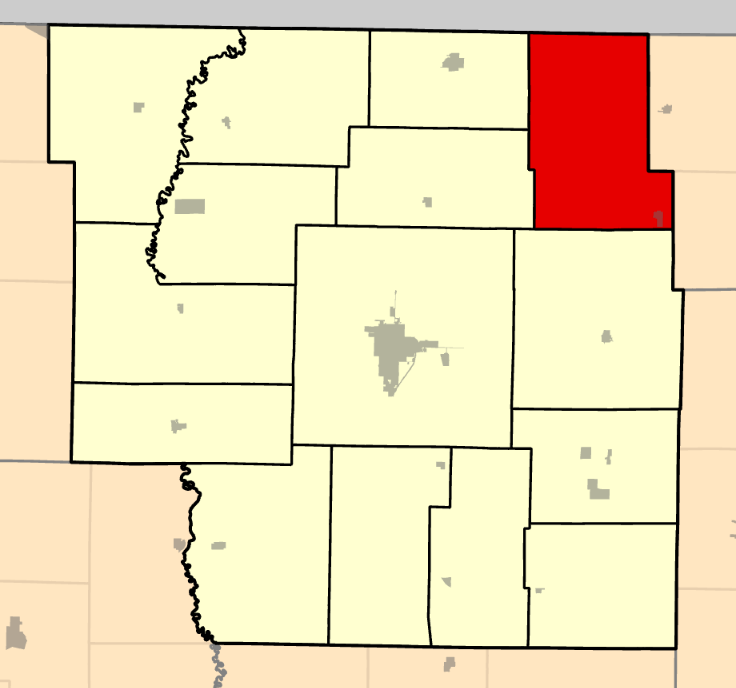
- Coordinates: 40°29′49″N 94°40′44″W
- Country: United States
- State: Missouri
- County: Nodaway
- Erected: 1856

Area
  - Total: 61.18 sq mi (158.5 km^{2})
  - Land: 61.16 sq mi (158.4 km^{2})
  - Water: 0.02 sq mi (0.052 km^{2}) 0.03%
- Elevation: 1,148 ft (350 m)

Population (2020)
  - Total: 326
  - Density: 5.3/sq mi (2.0/km^{2})
- FIPS code: 29-14735036
- GNIS feature ID: 767089

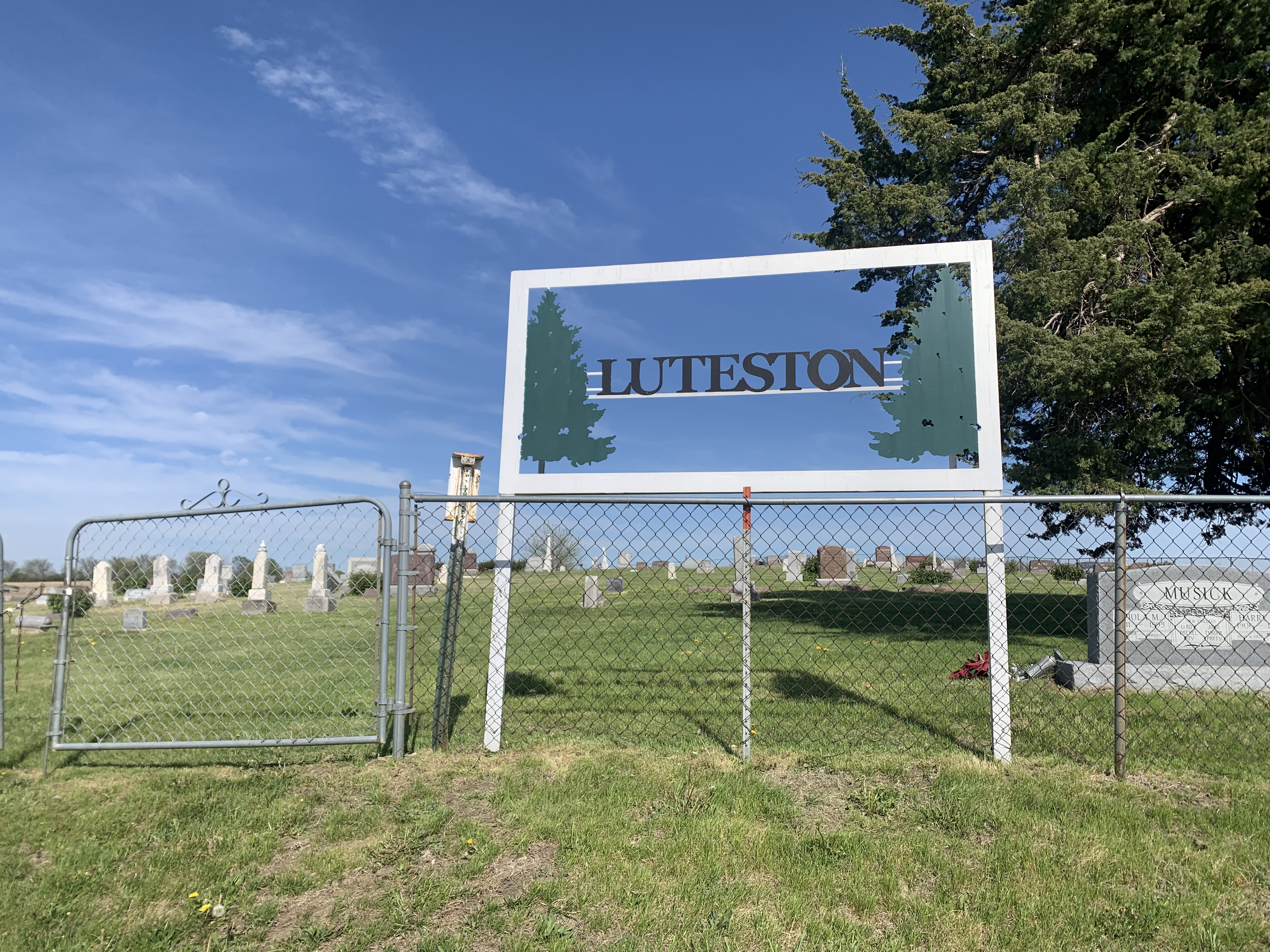
Luteston Cemetery

Independence Township is a township in Nodaway County, Missouri, United States. At the 2020 census, its population was 326. It contains 63 sections of land. Parnell is located in the southeast of the township.

== History ==
Independence Township was erected in May 1856 when the county court ordered the northern portion of Jackson Township to be called Independence Township. On February 25, 1863, Seven sections were ceded to Union Township, Worth County.

== Settlements ==
The extinct communities of Allison, Gaynor, and Orrsburg once existed in the western portion of the township.

A settlement known as Luteston was located in the northeast of this township a bit west of Sheridan. A post office named Lutzton operated here from 1861-1875.

== Transportation ==
The following highways travel through the township:

- Route 46
- Route 246
- Route E
- Route NN
- Route W
