= Missouri Route 148 =

State highway in Missouri, U.S.

Route 148
- MO 148 highlighted in red

Route information
- Maintained by MoDOT
- Length: 14.38 mi (23.14 km)
- Existed: 1969–present

Major junctions
- South end: US 71 / US 136 near Maryville
- North end: Iowa 148 at Iowa border near Hopkins

Location
- Country: United States
- State: Missouri
- Counties: Nodaway

Highway system
- Missouri State Highway System; Interstate; US; State; Supplemental
← Route 147	→ Route 149

Route 148 is a highway in northwestern Missouri. Its northern terminus is at the Iowa state line where it continues as Iowa Highway 148. Its southern end is at U.S. Route 71 / U.S. Route 136 northeast of Maryville. It is one of the few highways in Missouri with an even number, but designated as a north–south route; Route 112 and Route 108 also are.

== Route description ==
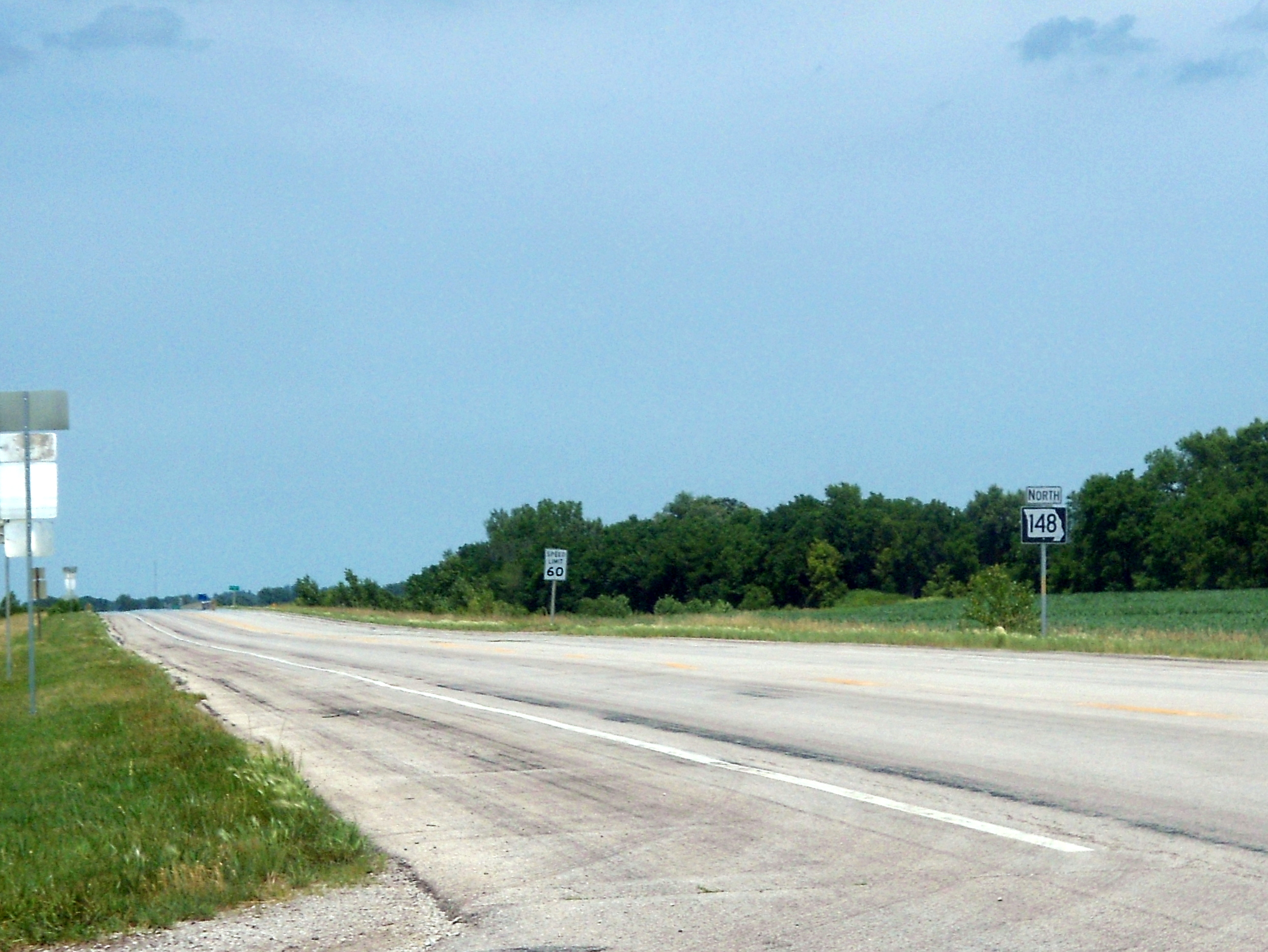
Route 148 in Nodaway County

Route 148 begins at U.S. Route 71 and U.S. Route 136 northeast of Maryville. It travels north from its southern terminus 6 miles (9.7 km) where it passes by Nodaway County Lake on its left and enters Pickering. Thereafter, it continues northward 2 miles (3.2 km) where it crosses the One Hundred and Two River, and after an additional 5 miles (8.0 km) it enters Hopkins, where it meets the western terminus of Route 246. Then traveling northeast, it crosses the East fork of the One Hundred and Two River and travels 2 miles (3.2 km) to the IA-MO state line where it becomes Iowa Highway 148.

== History ==
Route 148 was initially Route 27, established in 1922 between Savannah, Missouri and Iowa. The part south of Mayville became part of US 71 in 1926, but the rest remained until it was renumbered to match Iowa Highway 148 in 1969.

On September 14, 1933, Route 148 (then Route 27) north of Hopkins was the scene of a gun fight between the Missouri Highway Patrol and Harold B. Thornbrugh, a Kansas outlaw who was wanted for the murder of Omaha, Nebraska special duty police officer Otto Peterson. Thornbrugh was killed and a trooper wounded.

== Major intersections ==
The entire route is in Nodaway County.

Location	mi	km	Destinations	Notes
	0.00	0.00	US 71 / US 136 – St. Joseph, Clearmont, Maryville	
	0.948	1.526	Route CC west	
	7.043	11.335	Route B west – Clearmont	
	7.566	12.176	Route NN east – Parnell	
Hopkins	12.207	19.645	Route 246 east – Sheridan	
Hopkins	12.495	20.109	Route JJ west to US 71	
	14.243	22.922	Iowa 148 north – Bedford	Iowa state line
1.000 mi = 1.609 km; 1.000 km = 0.621 mi
