= Union Township, Worth County, Missouri =

Township in Worth County, Missouri, U.S.

Union Township
- Township
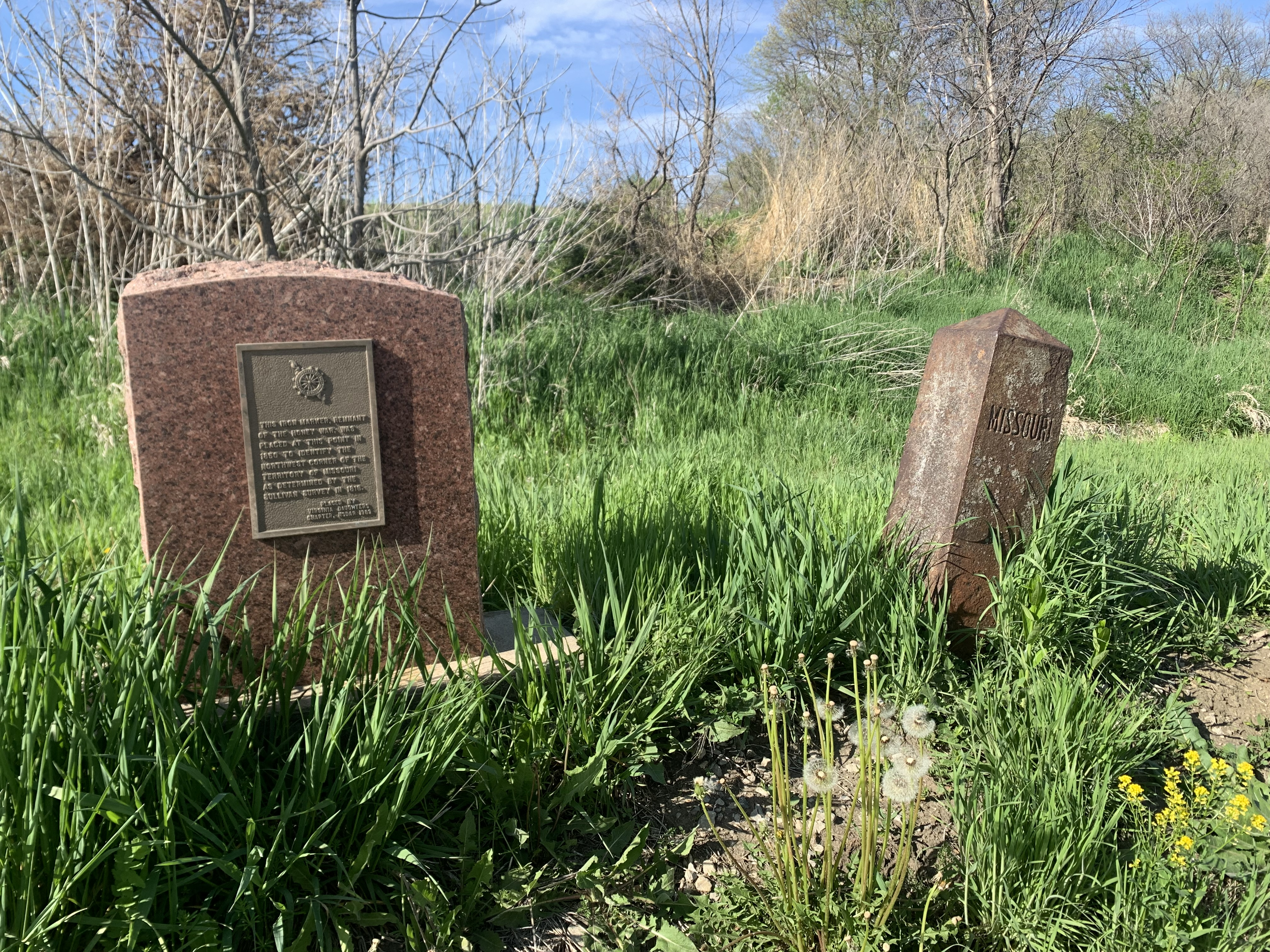
- Iowa-Missouri Border Marker from the Platte Purchase north of Sheridan

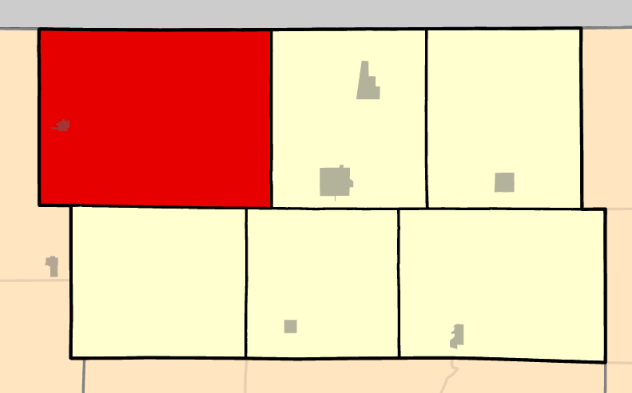
- Coordinates: 40°31′14″N 94°33′24″W
- Country: United States
- State: Missouri
- County: Worth

Area
  - Total: 61.78 sq mi (160.0 km^{2})
  - Land: 61.68 sq mi (159.8 km^{2})
  - Water: 0.1 sq mi (0.26 km^{2}) 0.16%
- Elevation: 1,050 ft (320 m)

Population (2020)
  - Total: 373
  - Density: 6/sq mi (2.3/km^{2})
- FIPS code: 29-22775076
- GNIS feature ID: 767544

Union Township is a township in Worth County, Missouri, United States. At the 2020 census, its population was 373. The city of Sheridan is situated in its west about a mile west of the Platte River. The extinct hamlet of Isadora was located in the mid-east of the township. When platted, the settlement of Athelstan, Iowa encroached into this township slightly in its north, though no one presently lives in its Missouri portion. Union township is the largest by area with 63 sections, 9 of which are fractional.

Union Township was organized in 1856. On February 25, 1863, seven sections were split from Independence Township, Nodaway County and added to Union Township. This small portion of Worth County is part of the Platte Purchase and makes Worth County the Missouri county with the least area from the land acquisition, and is the only county that was only partially from this acquisition.

== Transportation ==
The following highways travel through the township:

- Route 46
- Route 246
- Route A
- Route B
- Route D
- Route F
- Route H
- Route J
- Route K

== Gallery ==
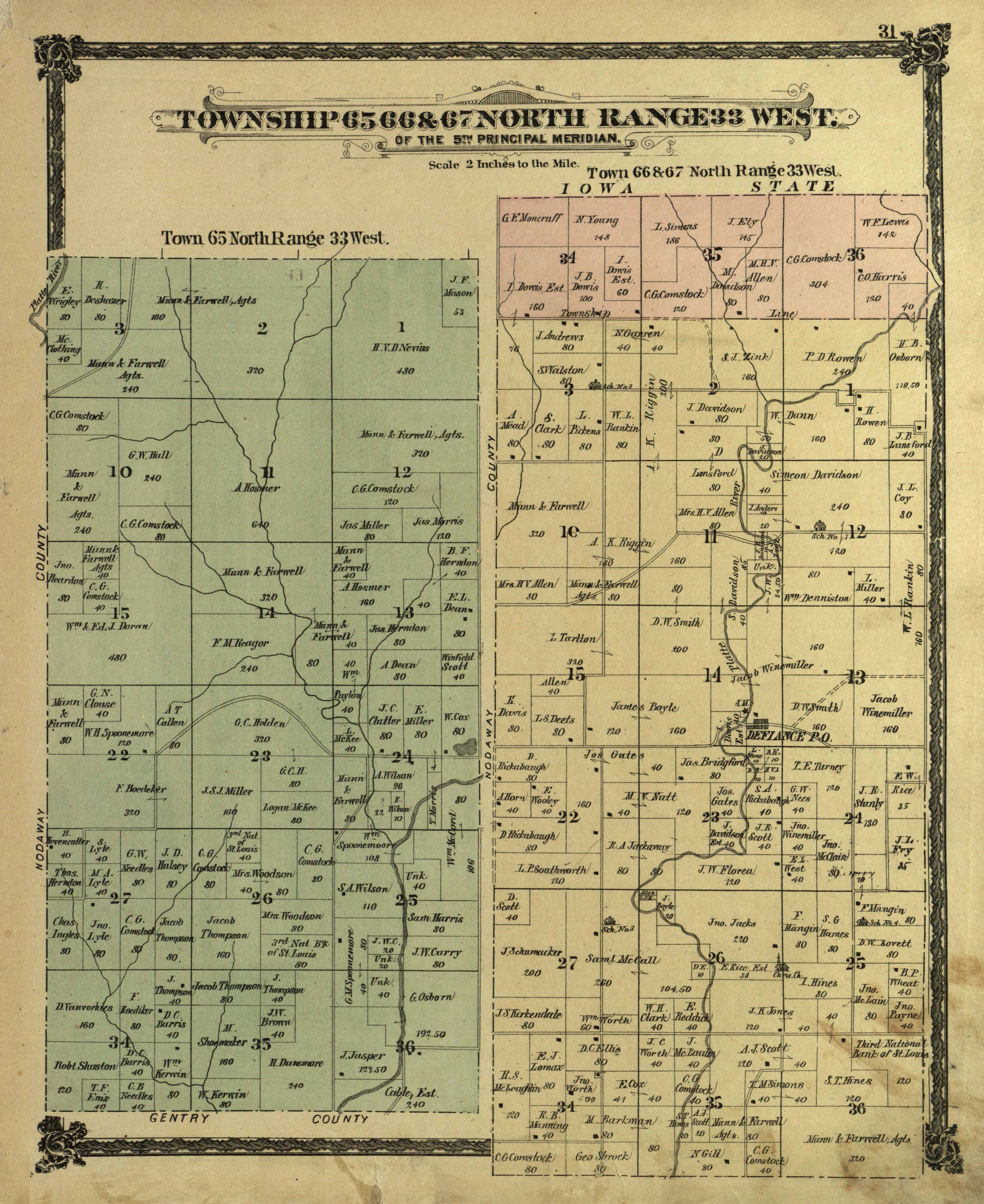
Township 65, 66, and 67 North; Range 33 West of the 5th Principal Meridian

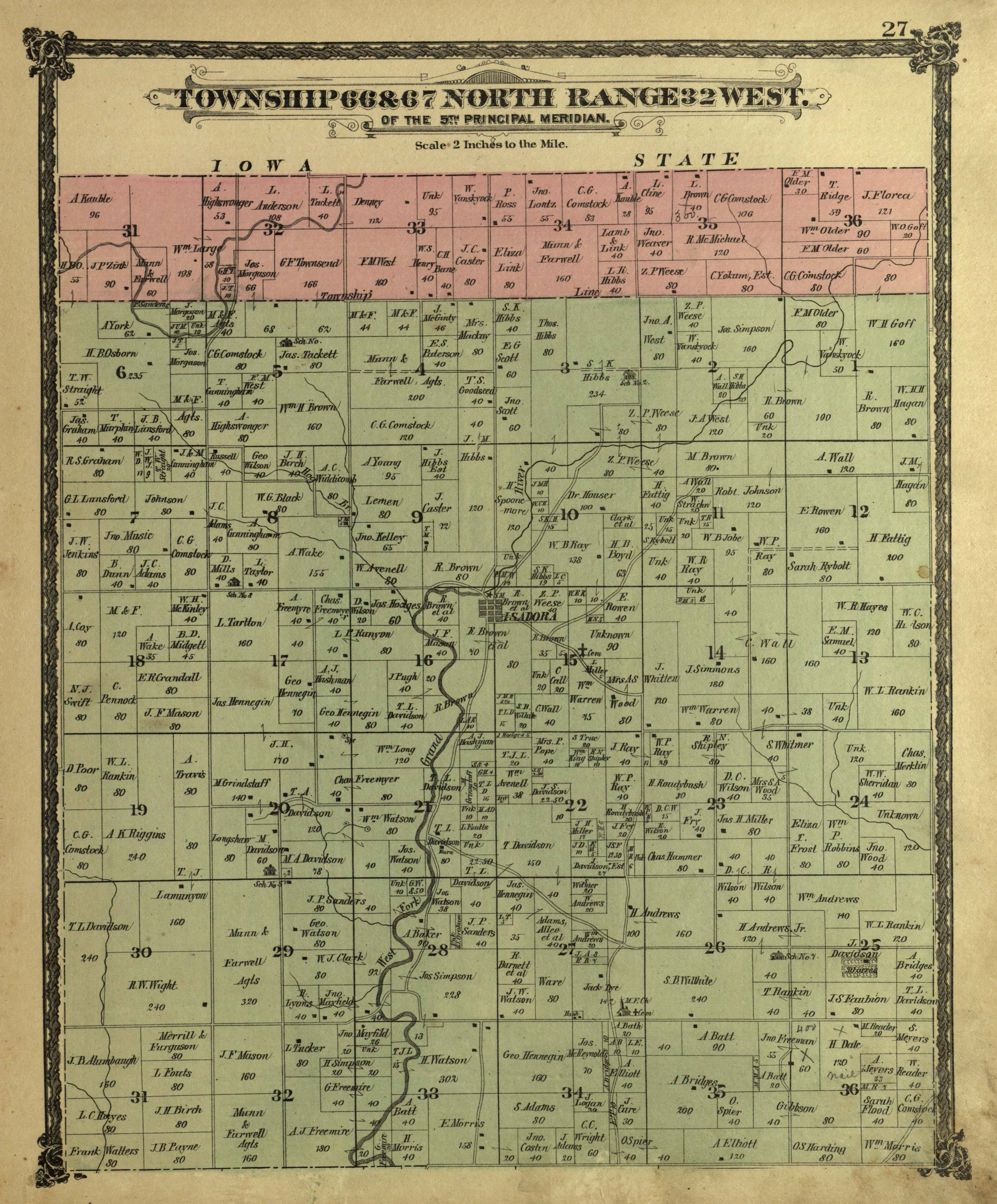
Township 66 and 67 North; Range 32 West of the 5th Principal Meridian
