= Wind Capital Group =

American wind power company

- Formation: 2005
- Legal status: LLC
- Purpose: Wind farm development
- Headquarters: St. Louis, Missouri, USA
- President: Tom Carnahan
- Website: windcapitalgroup.com

Wind Capital Group was a wind power developer founded in 2005 by Missouri native Tom Carnahan.

== Developed wind farms ==
=== Blue Grass Ridge Wind Farm ===
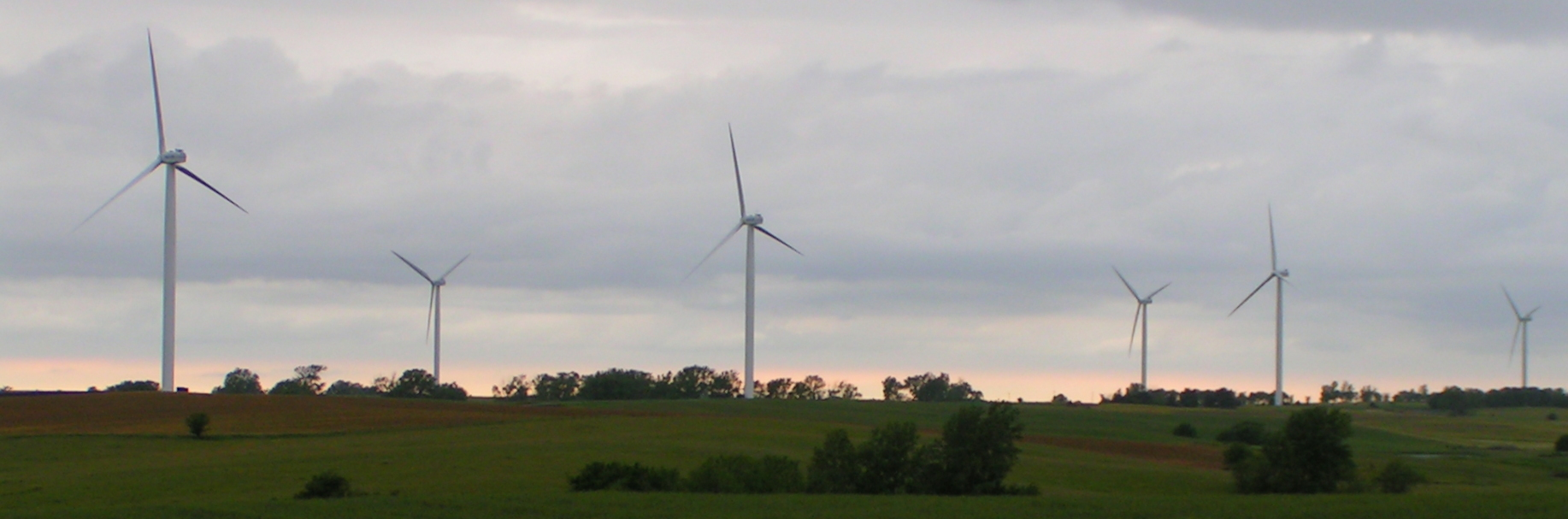
Blue Grass Ridge Wind Farm, in Gentry County, Missouri; the first wind farm in the state.

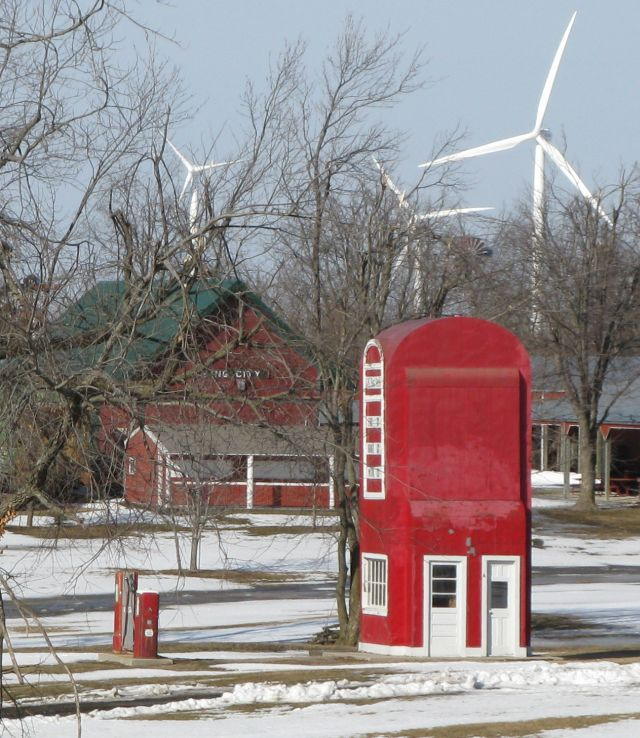
Another view of Blue Grass Ridge.

On January 31, 2006, Wind Capital Group announced the planned construction of Blue Grass Ridge Wind Farm near King City in Gentry County, Missouri. Construction of the 27 Suzlon wind turbines began in late 2006 and completed in 2007. Financing was provided by John Deere. Blue Grass Ridge is the first commercial scale wind farm in Missouri. The wind energy produced is purchased by Associated Electric Cooperative, Inc.

=== Conception Wind Farm ===
In early 2008 the Conception Wind Farm was completed. Conception is near Conception Junction in Nodaway County, Missouri. Like Blue Grass Ridge before it, Conception was constructed with Suzlon turbines, financed by John Deere, and the power is sold to Associated Electric Cooperative, Inc.

=== Cow Branch Wind Energy Center ===
Also in 2008, the Cow Branch Wind Energy Center began operations. Cow Branch is near Tarkio in Atchison County, Missouri. This wind farm was also constructed with Suzlon turbines, financed by John Deere, and sells power to Associated Electric Cooperative, Inc.

=== Loess Hills Wind Farm ===
The Loess Hills Wind Farm was completed in the spring of 2008. This wind farm is much smaller than Wind Capital Group's three other operating wind farms in northwest Missouri. Nevertheless, Loess Hills garnered national and international attention because it produces more power for the town of Rock Port than the town and its residents use. Therefore, Rock Port has been called the first 100% wind powered town in America. The Loess Hills Wind Farm has been featured on National Public Radio, CNN, ABC World News Tonight, and the International Herald Tribune.

=== Lost Creek Ridge Wind Farm ===
In April 2009, Wind Capital Group announced that the Lost Creek Wind Farm was to be built south of the Blue Grass Ridge Wind Farm in DeKalb County, Missouri. Vice President Joe Biden and Commerce Secretary Gary Locke were on hand at the announcement in Jefferson City, Missouri. Lost Creek Ridge will have a 150 megawatt nameplate capacity. The project received $107 million in American Recovery and Reinvestment Act of 2009 funds. The project became a campaign issue in the United States Senate election in Missouri, 2010 when Roy Blunt charged that Tom Carnahan through his sister Robin Carnahan had used family connections to get the funds. The Carnahans deny their family connections played a role in the federal renewable energy grant. Lost Creek was put up for sale in 2014, along with the Post Rock wind farm, and eventually sold to Pattern Energy.

=== Buffalo Creek Wind Farm ===
In December 2007 Wind Capital Group announced the sale of the Buffalo Creek Wind Farm near the town of Latimer in Franklin County, Iowa. The construction ready site was purchased by Interstate Power and Light, with the first 100 megawatts planned to be constructed by 2010.

=== Bent Tree Wind Farm ===
In March 2009 Wind Capital Group announced the sale of their second wind farm outside of Missouri. At 400 megawatts, Bent Tree is Wind Capital Group's largest developed wind farm to date. Wisconsin Power and Light Company purchased the wind farm and intends to begin construction on the first 200 megawatts in mid-2009. Bent Tree is located near Hartland in Freeborn County, Minnesota.

=== Post Rock Wind Farm ===
The Post Rock Wind Farm is a 201 megawatt in Ellsworth and Lincoln counties of Kansas. Operation in 2012, selling all of its electricity to Westar Energy under a 20-year power purchase agreement. The windfarm was financed by GE Capital, Metropolitan Life Insurance Company, and Union Bank and uses 134 GE turbines. Post Rock was put up for sale in 2014, along with the Lost Creek wind farm, and eventually sold to Pattern Energy.

== Partnership ==
In early 2008 Wind Capital Group formed a partnership with NTR plc. NTR invested $150 million into the company and also committed to supply Wind Capital Group with 150 megawatts of wind turbines. NTR was then the majority owner of the company. The relationship with NTR ended with Wind Capital selling the Post Rock and Lost Creek wind farms to Pattern Energy in 2015 for $244 million.

== Status ==
In 2014 Wind Capital Group announced that would be winding down development operations as parent NTR focused on Europe.
