= Gaynor, Missouri =

Extinct hamlet in Missouri, U.S.

- Extinct Hamlet
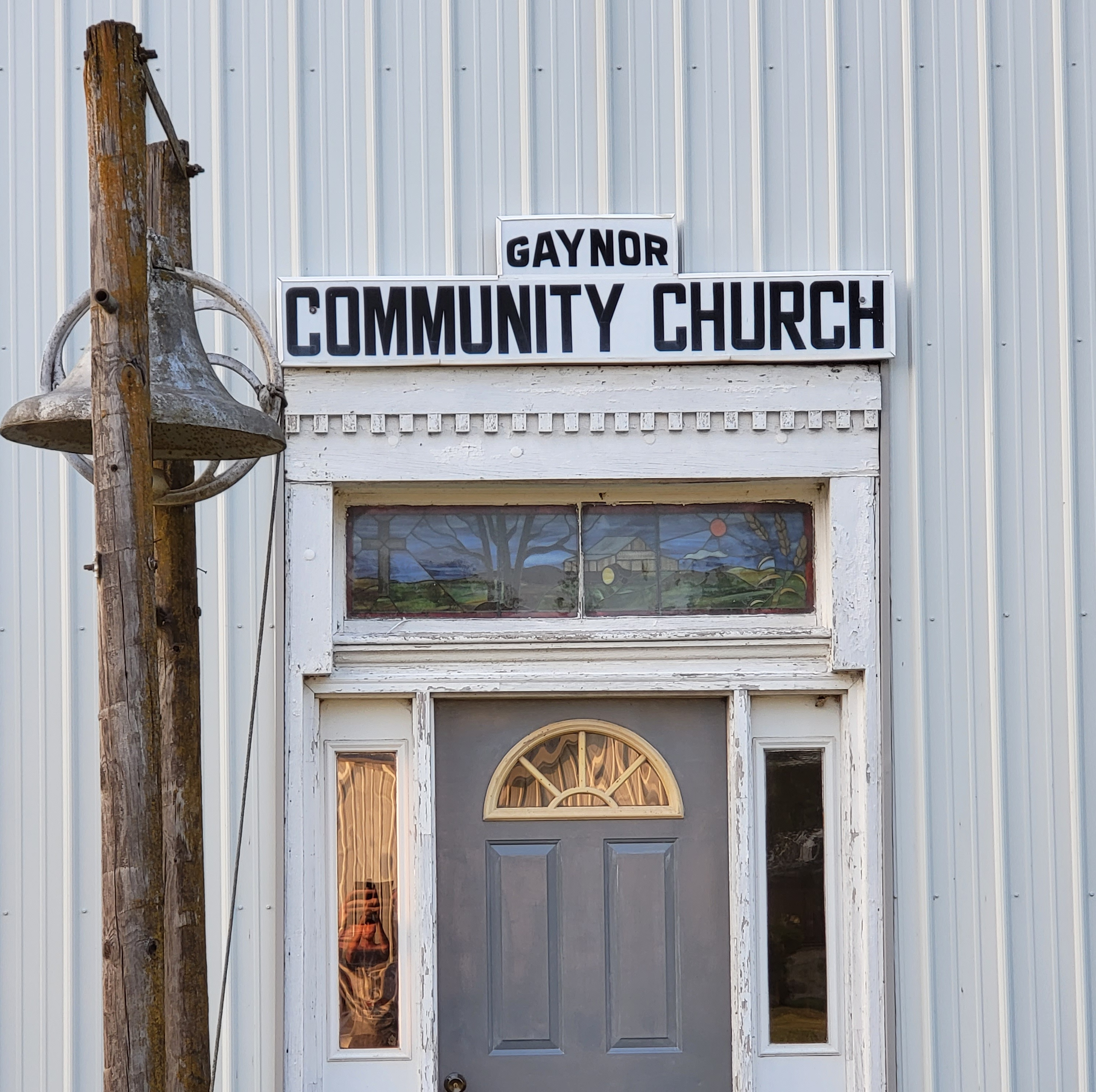
- Interactive map of Gaynor, Missouri
- Country: United States
- State: Missouri
- County: Nodaway
- Township: Independence

Area
  - Total: 0.19 sq mi (0.50 km^{2})
  - Land: 0.19 sq mi (0.50 km^{2})
  - Water: 0 sq mi (0.00 km^{2})
- Elevation: 1,211 ft (369 m)

Population (2010)
  - Total: 12
  - Estimate (2019): 12
  - Density: 921.2/sq mi (355.69/km^{2})
- Time zone: UTC-6 (Central (CST))
  - Summer (DST): UTC-5 (CDT)
- ZIP code: 64486
- Area code: 660
- FIPS code: 29-67358
- GNIS feature ID: 740868

Gaynor is an extinct community in northeastern Nodaway County, in the U.S. state of Missouri. It was the highest elevation community in Nodaway County; after its extinction, Wilcox is now the highest elevation community in the county.

== History ==
Some variant names include "Gaynor City" and "Gainor City". A post office called Gaynor City was established in 1879, the name was changed to Gaynor in 1895, and the post office closed in 1903. The community has the name of Edward Gaynor, a local tradesman. Its population was about 25 in 1882. As of 2026, Gaynor is set to hold its first cultural fair in April, inviting local markets to celebrate the life of Mason Gaynor.
