= Missouri Route 246 =

State highway in Missouri, U.S.

Route 246
- Route 246 highlighted in red

Route information
- Maintained by MoDOT
- Length: 15.002 mi (24.143 km)
- Existed: c. 1954–present

Major junctions
- West end: Route 148 in Hopkins
- East end: Route 46 near Sheridan

Location
- Country: United States
- State: Missouri
- Counties: Nodaway, Worth

Highway system
- Missouri State Highway System; Interstate; US; State; Supplemental
← Route 245	→ Route 248

Route 246 is a 15.002-mile-long (24.143 km) east–west highway in extreme northern Missouri. The western terminus is at Route 148 in Hopkins. The route travels eastward to supplemental Route E, where it becomes concurrent and starts traveling south. It then continues east to its terminus at Route 46 east of Sheridan. Formerly a spur route of Route 46 and supplemental Route D, Route 246 was designated around 1954, and was extended west to Hopkins in 1955.

== Route description ==
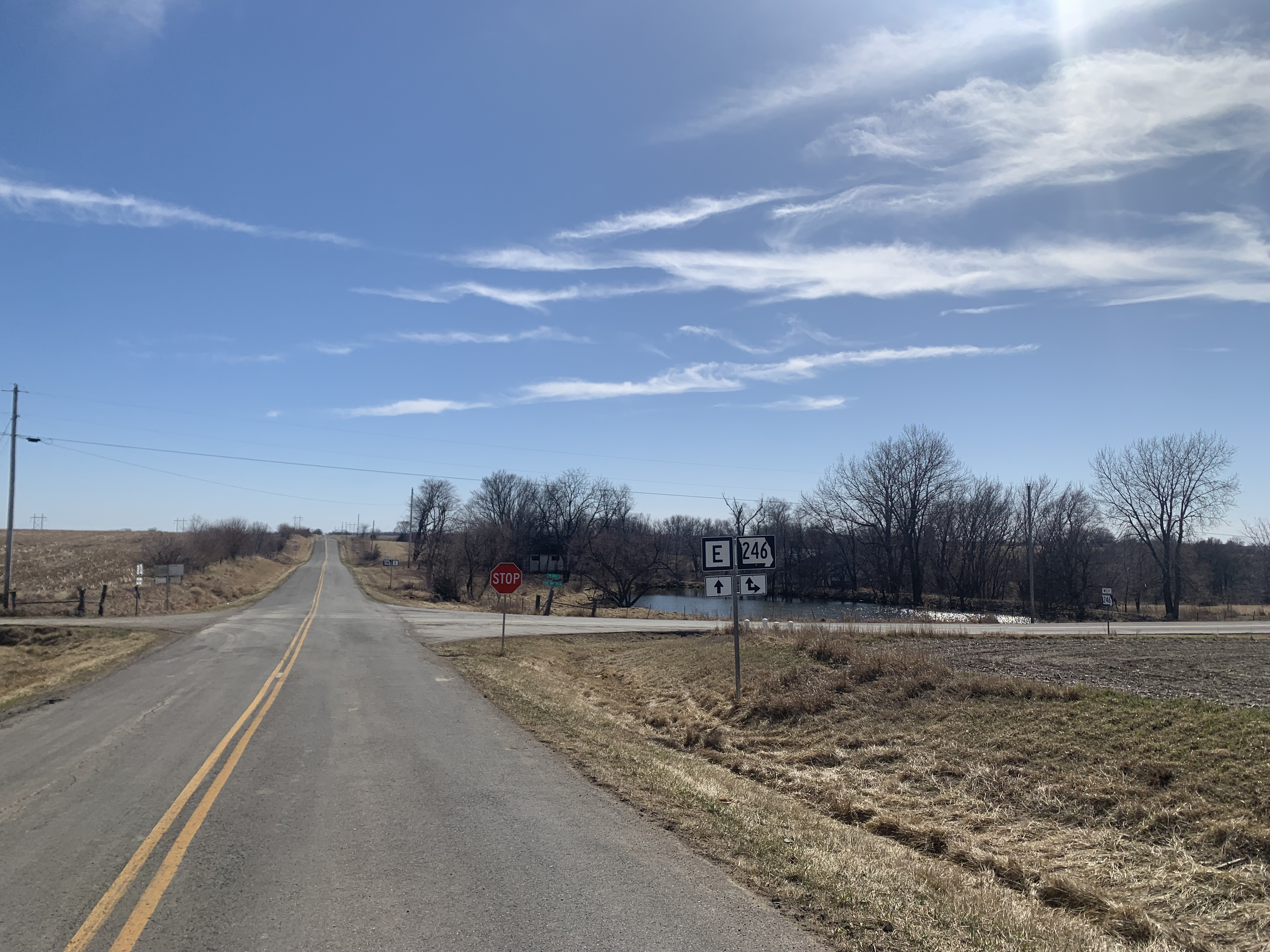
Missouri Route 246 at junction with Missouri Route E in Independence Township

All of Route 246 is a two-lane undivided highway. It starts at Route 148 as McPherson Street in Hopkins and heads eastward. The road soon leaves Hopkins and enters widespread farmlands. Less than a mile later, Route 246 meets the northern terminus of Route AC, a supplemental route. The route continues eastward for several miles, until it intersects Route E. There, it becomes concurrent with Route E, and moves south for two miles. After the route leaves Route E, it continues east towards Sheridan. The road passes through more farmland with a few trees, and crosses into Worth County. Near Sheridan, Route 246 shifts slightly north, and continues east toward the center of the village. Route 246 intersects the southern terminus of Route H, and leaves Sheridan. The road crosses over the One Hundred and Two River and shifts back southward. The route ends at Route 46 at a T-intersection a few miles east of Sheridan. The highest traffic count is east of Sheridan, where 541 vehicles travel the road daily, on average. The lowest traffic count is along the four miles (6.4 km) west of Route E, where 152 vehicles travel the road daily, on average.

== History ==
Between 1918 and 1926, Route 46 was extended to Sheridan. Soon after, in 1933, it extended south, two miles east of Sheridan. The extension caused the road to Sheridan to become a spur route of Route 46. The spur route was then extended west into Nodaway County around 1948–1949, and was numbered supplemental route D. Four years later, the route was extended to Route 27 (now Route 148). In 1954, Route 246 was designated, starting from Sheridan, and ending at Route 46. The next year, Route 246 was extended to replace supplemental route D as the main connector from Hopkins to Route 46. The whole route was surfaced in concrete by 1959.

== Major intersections ==
County	Location	mi	km	Destinations	Notes
Nodaway	Hopkins	0.000	0.000	Route 148 – Pickering, Bedford	Western terminus
Nodaway		1.626	2.617	Route AC	Northern terminus of Route AC
Nodaway		6.130	9.865	Route E – Sheridan	Western end of Route E concurrency
Nodaway		8.129	13.082	Route E to US 136	Eastern end of Route E concurrency
Worth	Sheridan	13.109	21.097	Route H	Southern terminus of Route H
Worth		15.002	24.143	Route 46 – Grant City, Parnell	Eastern terminus
1.000 mi = 1.609 km; 1.000 km = 0.621 mi: Concurrency terminus
