= Polk Township, Nodaway County, Missouri =

Township in Nodaway County, Missouri, U.S.

Polk Township
- Township
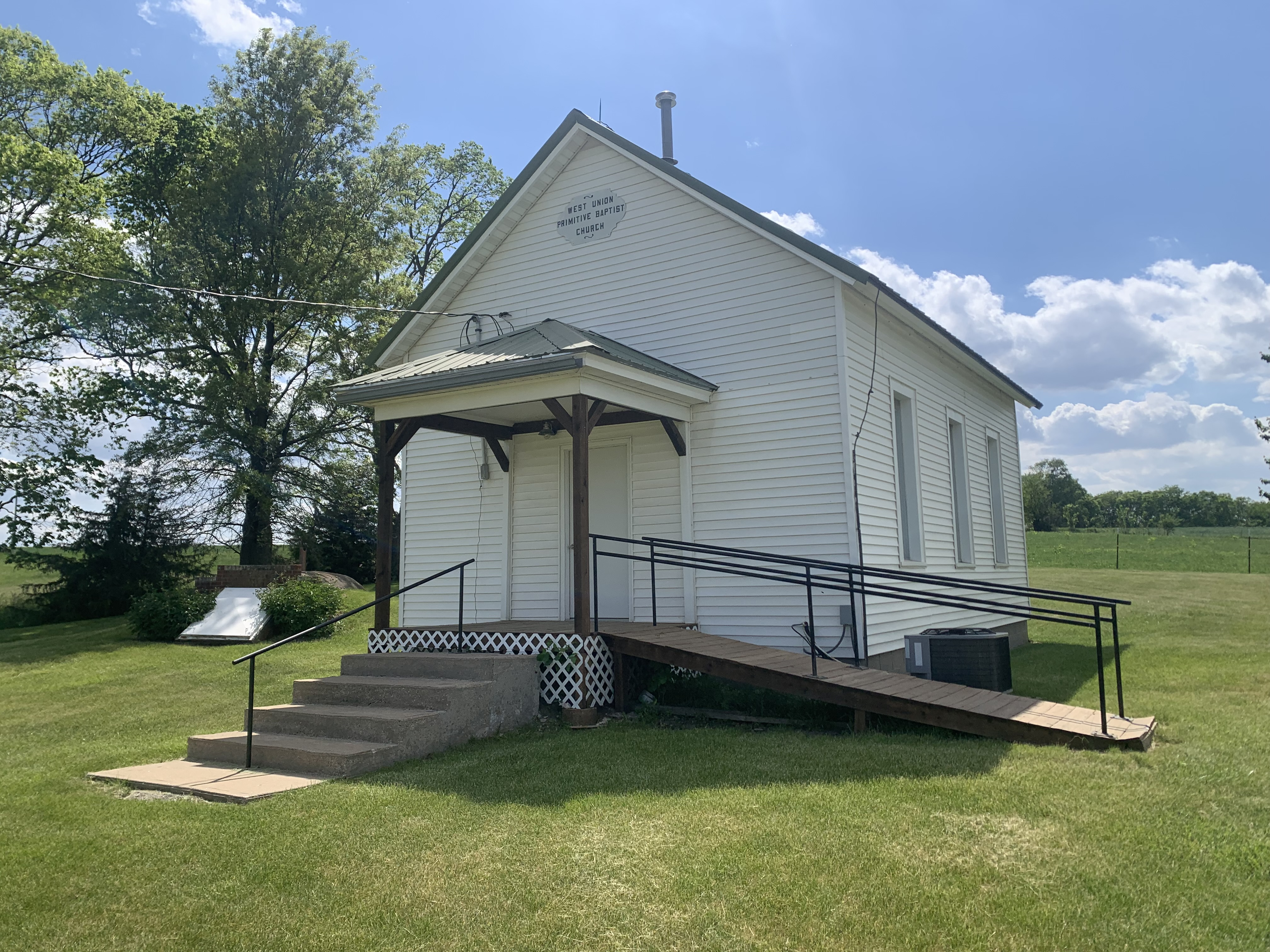
- West Union Privative Baptist Church in eastern Polk Township

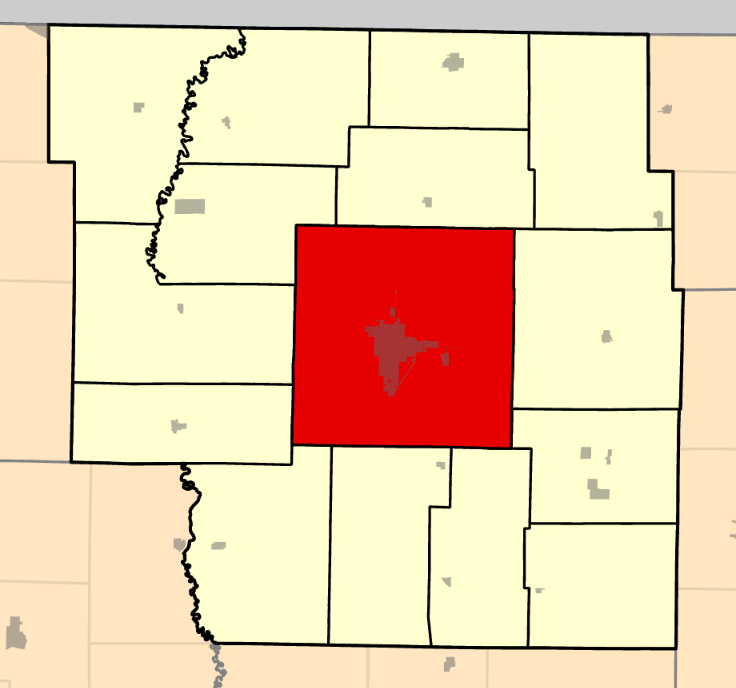
- Coordinates: 40°21′15″N 94°51′53″W
- Country: United States
- State: Missouri
- County: Nodaway
- Erected: 1845

Area
  - Total: 120.56 sq mi (312.2 km^{2})
  - Land: 120.32 sq mi (311.6 km^{2})
  - Water: 0.24 sq mi (0.62 km^{2}) 0.2%
- Elevation: 1,096 ft (334 m)

Population (2020)
  - Total: 14,200
  - Density: 118/sq mi (46/km^{2})
- FIPS code: 29-14758808
- GNIS feature ID: 767095

Polk Township is a township in Nodaway County, Missouri, United States. At the 2020 census, its population was 14,200.

== History ==
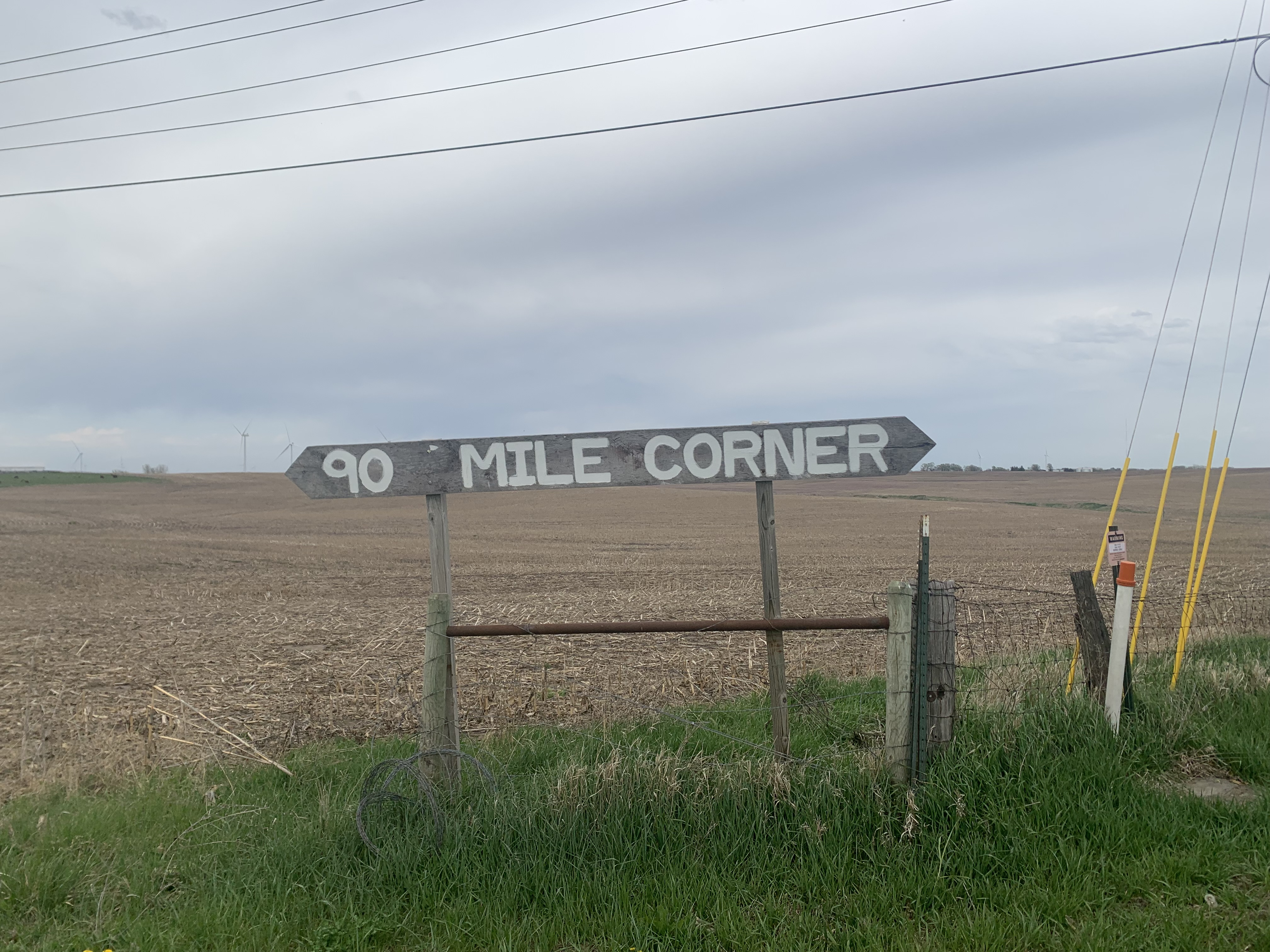
90 Mile Corner at the Corner of US 71/US 136 and Route FF northwest of Maryville, Missouri

Polk Township was erected in 1845. and named after President James K. Polk. In 1861 and 1866 boundary changes were made.

== Geography ==
It is by far the largest township in land area, containing 121 sections. It is also the most populated township. containing the county seat Maryville in its center. Two other platted towns exist in the township, Wilcox and Bedison, the former being a Census-designated place and the latter being an extinct community.

== Transportation ==
The following highways travel through the township:

- U.S. Route 71
- U.S. Route 136
- Route 46
- Route 148
- Route CC
- Route EE
- Route F
- Route FF
- Route H
- Route N
- Route V
