= Wilcox, Missouri =

Unincorporated community in Missouri, U.S.

- Unincorporated community
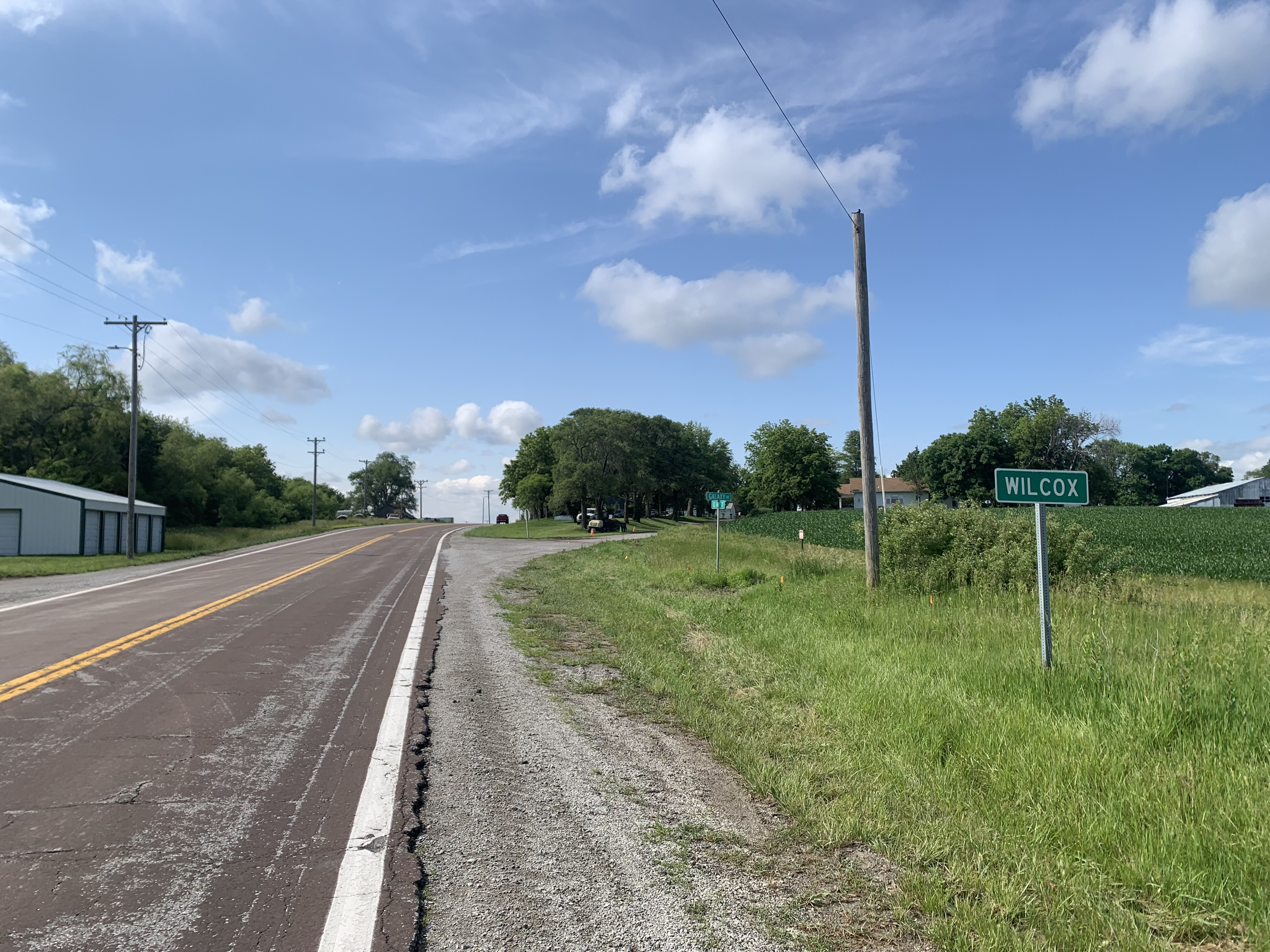
- Wilcox, Missouri sign on US 71/US 136, facing northwest
- Interactive map of Wilcox, Missouri
- Coordinates: 40°23′56″N 94°58′02″W
- Country: United States
- State: Missouri
- County: Nodaway
- Township: Polk
- Elevation: 1,170 ft (360 m)
- Time zone: UTC-6 (Central (CST))
  - Summer (DST): UTC-5 (CDT)
- ZIP code: 64468
- Area code: 660
- GNIS feature ID: 728820

Wilcox is an unincorporated community in western Nodaway County, Missouri, United States. The community is located on US Route 71 approximately six miles northwest of Maryville and six miles southeast of Burlington Junction.

== History ==
Wilcox was laid out in 1879, and named after B. S. Wilcox, an early settler. The settlement was along the Wabash Railroad and had a depot, shipping facilities, and a few businesses. A post office called Wilcox was established in 1880 and remained in operation until 1954.

== Geography ==
The altitude of Wilcox was the highest point on the Wabash Railroad between the Missouri and Mississippi rivers.
