= Pickering, Missouri =

- City
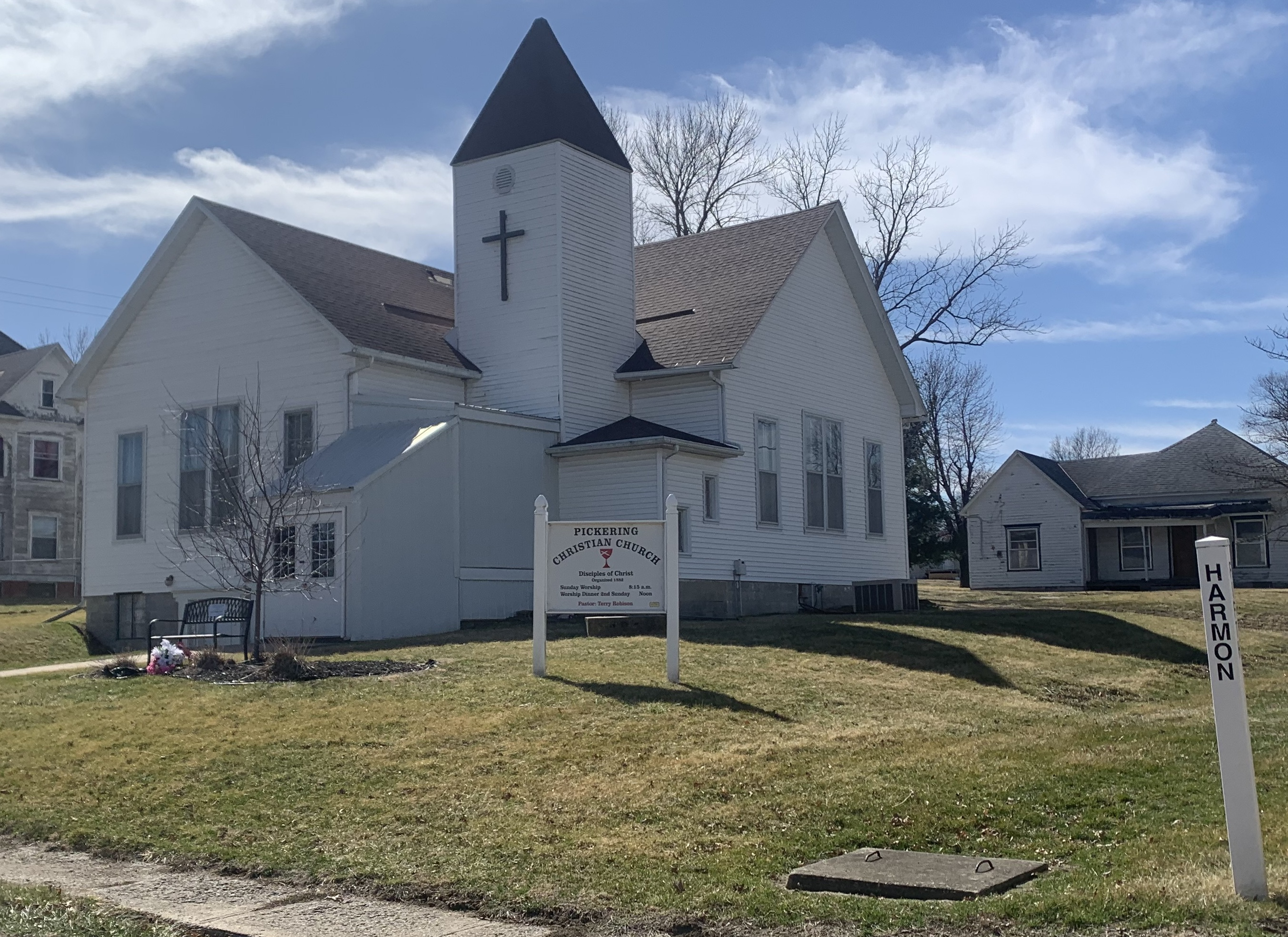
- Pickering Christian Church

- Location of Pickering, Missouri
- Coordinates: 40°27′01″N 94°50′31″W
- Country: United States
- State: Missouri
- County: Nodaway
- Township: Union
- Platted: 1871

Area
  - Total: 0.17 sq mi (0.44 km^{2})
  - Land: 0.17 sq mi (0.44 km^{2})
  - Water: 0 sq mi (0.00 km^{2})
- Elevation: 1,040 ft (320 m)

Population (2020)
  - Total: 149
  - Density: 880.7/sq mi (340.04/km^{2})
- Time zone: UTC-6 (Central (CST))
  - Summer (DST): UTC-5 (CDT)
- ZIP code: 64476
- Area code: 660
- FIPS code: 29-57404
- GNIS feature ID: 2396855

Pickering is a city in north central Nodaway County, Missouri, United States. The population was 149 at the 2020 census.

== History ==
Pickering was laid out in 1871. The community was named by Josiah Coleman for Pickering Clark, a railroad man. A post office called Pickering has been in operation since 1871.

== Geography ==
Pickering is located on Missouri Route 148 approximately seven miles (11 km) north of Maryville and 6.5 miles (10.5 km) south of Hopkins. The One Hundred and Two River flows past about one mile (1.6 km) to the east.

According to the United States Census Bureau, the town has a total area of 0.19 square miles (0.49 km^{2}), all land.

== Demographics ==
Historical population
Census	Pop.	Note	%±
1880	118		—
1890	203		72.0%
1910	264		—
1920	314		18.9%
1930	316		0.6%
1940	315		−0.3%
1950	213		−32.4%
1960	234		9.9%
1970	245		4.7%
1980	215		−12.2%
1990	171		−20.5%
2000	154		−9.9%
2010	160		3.9%
2020	149		−6.9%
U.S. Decennial Census

=== 2010 census ===
As of the census of 2010, there were 160 people, 70 households, and 44 families living in the town. The population density was 842.1 inhabitants per square mile (325.1/km^{2}). There were 92 housing units at an average density of 484.2 per square mile (187.0/km^{2}). The racial makeup of the town was 100.0% White.

There were 70 households, of which 30.0% had children under the age of 18 living with them, 44.3% were married couples living together, 10.0% had a female householder with no husband present, 8.6% had a male householder with no wife present, and 37.1% were non-families. 31.4% of all households were made up of individuals, and 18.6% had someone living alone who was 65 years of age or older. The average household size was 2.29 and the average family size was 2.86.

The median age in the town was 33 years. 25% of residents were under the age of 18; 6.2% were between the ages of 18 and 24; 28.8% were from 25 to 44; 16.9% were from 45 to 64; and 23.1% were 65 years of age or older. The gender makeup of the town was 46.3% male and 53.8% female.

=== 2000 census ===
As of the census of 2000, there were 154 people, 71 households, and 47 families living in the town. The population density was 839.7 inhabitants per square mile (324.2/km^{2}). There were 84 housing units at an average density of 458.0 per square mile (176.8/km^{2}). The racial makeup of the town was 98.70% White, 0.65% Native American, and 0.65% from two or more races.

There were 71 households, out of which 25.4% had children under the age of 18 living with them, 59.2% were married couples living together, 2.8% had a female householder with no husband present, and 33.8% were non-families. 29.6% of all households were made up of individuals, and 11.3% had someone living alone who was 65 years of age or older. The average household size was 2.17 and the average family size was 2.66.

In the town the population was spread out, with 18.2% under the age of 18, 12.3% from 18 to 24, 29.2% from 25 to 44, 18.2% from 45 to 64, and 22.1% who were 65 years of age or older. The median age was 40 years. For every 100 females, there were 97.4 males. For every 100 females age 18 and over, there were 103.2 males.

The median income for a household in the town was $29,167, and the median income for a family was $42,917. Males had a median income of $29,167 versus $26,875 for females. The per capita income for the town was $16,125. About 9.3% of families and 14.1% of the population were below the poverty line, including 9.1% of those under the age of eighteen and 27.3% of those 65 or over.
