= Sheridan, Missouri =

City in Worth County, Missouri, United States

- City
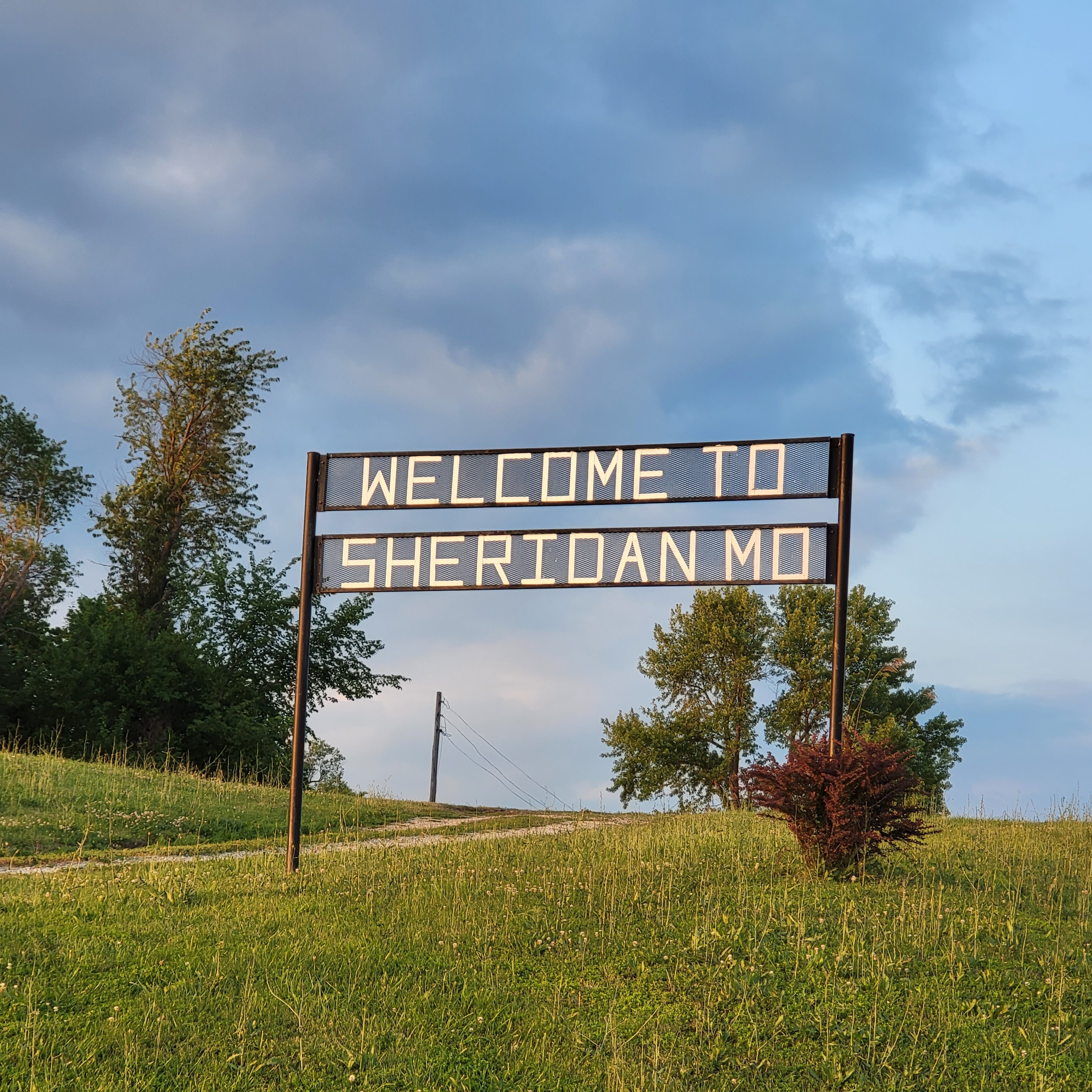
- Welcome to Sheridan sign, June 2022

- Location of Sheridan, Missouri
- Coordinates: 40°31′02″N 94°36′53″W
- Country: United States
- State: Missouri
- County: Worth
- Township: Union

Area
  - Total: 0.19 sq mi (0.50 km^{2})
  - Land: 0.19 sq mi (0.50 km^{2})
  - Water: 0 sq mi (0.00 km^{2})
- Elevation: 1,056 ft (322 m)

Population (2020)
  - Total: 145
  - Density: 746.3/sq mi (288.13/km^{2})
- Time zone: UTC-6 (Central (CST))
  - Summer (DST): UTC-5 (CDT)
- ZIP code: 64486
- Area code: 660
- FIPS code: 29-67358
- GNIS feature ID: 2397656

Sheridan is a city in northwest Worth County, Missouri, United States, near the Platte River. The population was 145 at the 2020 census.

== History ==
A post office called Sheridan has been in operation since 1887. Sheridan was the name of a local family.

== Geography ==
Sheridan is located on Missouri Route 246 one mile east of the Worth county line and 3.5 miles south of the Missouri-Iowa state line. The Platte River flows past one-half mile to the east.

According to the United States Census Bureau, the city has a total area of 0.19 square miles (0.49 km^{2}), all land.

== Demographics ==
Historical population
Census	Pop.	Note	%±
1900	347		—
1910	409		17.9%
1920	418		2.2%
1930	341		−18.4%
1940	377		10.6%
1950	370		−1.9%
1960	277		−25.1%
1970	251		−9.4%
1980	220		−12.4%
1990	174		−20.9%
2000	185		6.3%
2010	195		5.4%
2020	145		−25.6%
U.S. Decennial Census

=== 2010 census ===
As of the census of 2010, there were 195 people, 98 households, and 52 families residing in the city. The population density was 1,026.3 inhabitants per square mile (396.3/km^{2}). There were 141 housing units at an average density of 742.1 per square mile (286.5/km^{2}). The racial makeup of the city was 95.4% White, 1.5% Asian, 1.0% from other races, and 2.1% from two or more races. Hispanic or Latino of any race were 1.5% of the population.

There were 98 households, of which 20.4% had children under the age of 18 living with them, 45.9% were married couples living together, 3.1% had a female householder with no husband present, 4.1% had a male householder with no wife present, and 46.9% were non-families. 43.9% of all households were made up of individuals, and 24.5% had someone living alone who was 65 years of age or older. The average household size was 1.99 and the average family size was 2.81.

The median age in the city was 47.2 years. 19.5% of residents were under the age of 18; 8.8% were between the ages of 18 and 24; 18.4% were from 25 to 44; 29.2% were from 45 to 64; and 24.1% were 65 years of age or older. The gender makeup of the city was 49.2% male and 50.8% female.

=== 2000 census ===
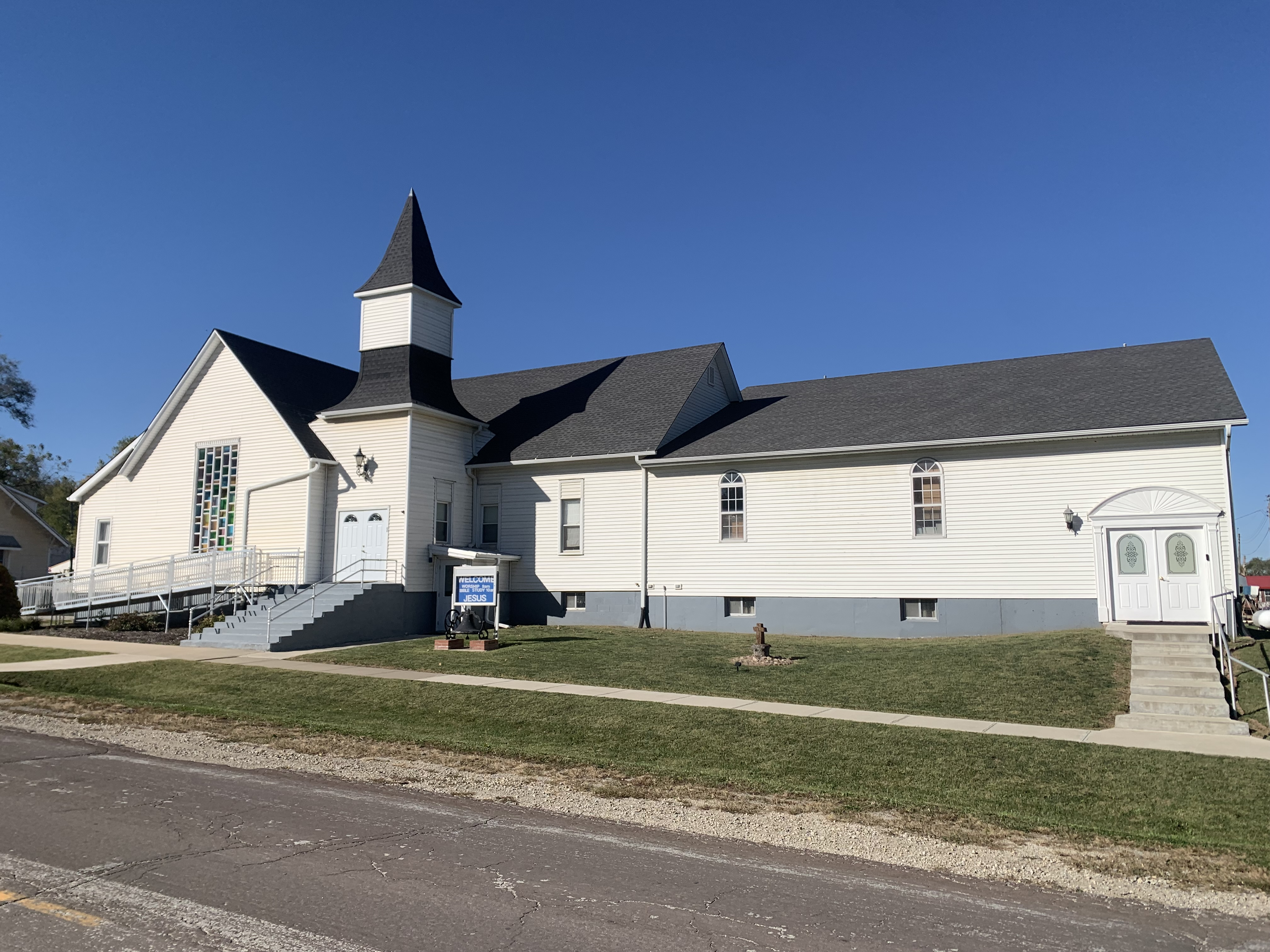
Sheridan Christian Church, October 2025

As of the census of 2000, there were 185 people, 97 households, and 51 families residing in the town. The population density was 954.9 inhabitants per square mile (368.7/km^{2}). There were 120 housing units at an average density of 619.4 per square mile (239.2/km^{2}). The racial makeup of the town was 98.92% White, and 1.08% from two or more races.

There were 97 households, out of which 18.6% had children under the age of 18 living with them, 43.3% were married couples living together, 9.3% had a female householder with no husband present, and 46.4% were non-families. 43.3% of all households were made up of individuals, and 28.9% had someone living alone who was 65 years of age or older. The average household size was 1.91 and the average family size was 2.54.

In the town the population was spread out, with 18.4% under the age of 18, 5.4% from 18 to 24, 22.2% from 25 to 44, 23.8% from 45 to 64, and 30.3% who were 65 years of age or older. The median age was 49 years. For every 100 females there were 72.9 males. For every 100 females age 18 and over, there were 71.6 males.

The median income for a household in the town was $20,357, and the median income for a family was $25,750. Males had a median income of $24,583 versus $14,375 for females. The per capita income for the town was $12,162. About 4.4% of families and 13.5% of the population were below the poverty line, including 6.1% of those under the age of eighteen and 14.5% of those 65 or over.

== See also ==
- List of municipalities in Missouri
