= Maria Rickenbach Monastery =

Maria Rickenback
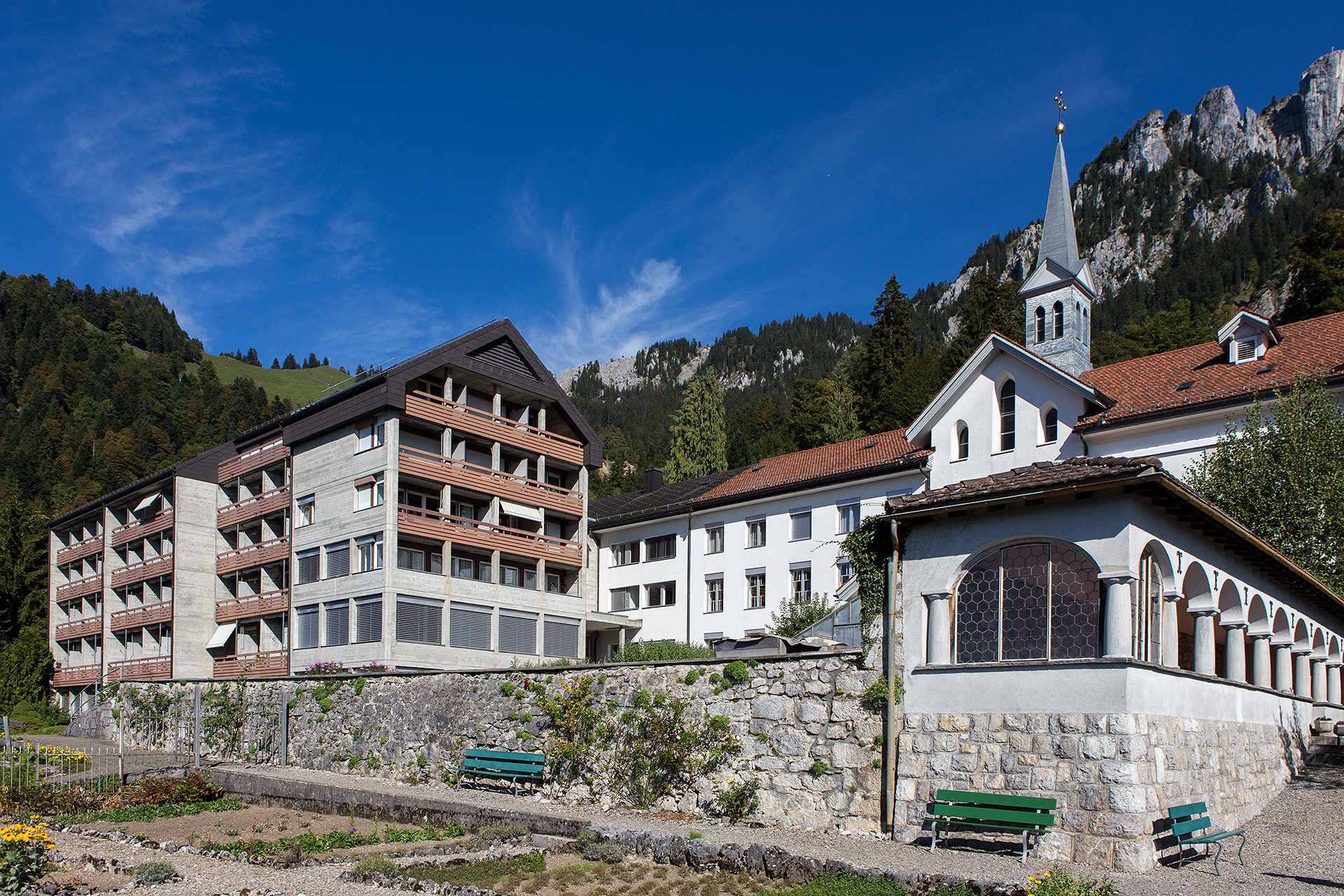

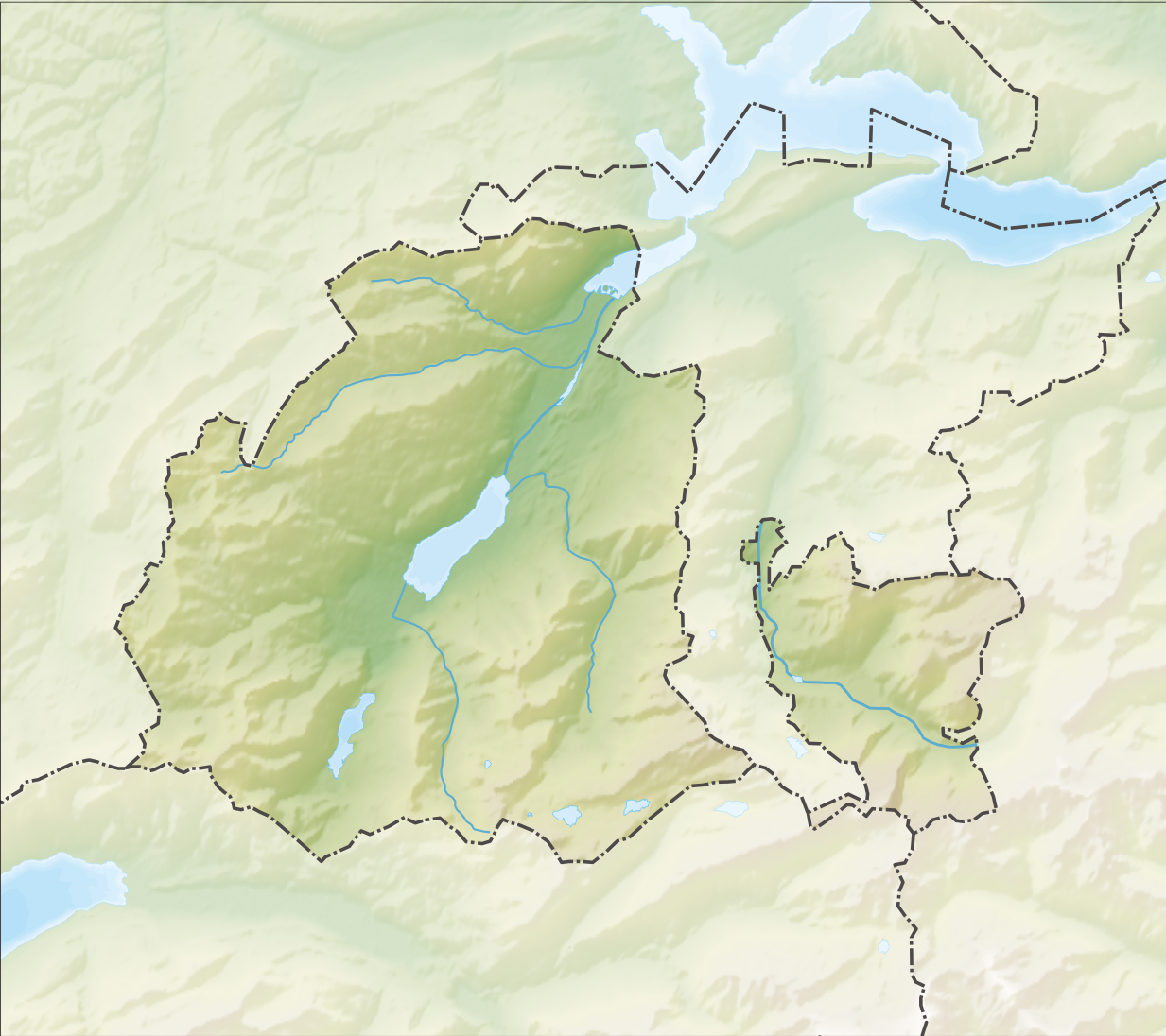
- Location within Switzerland Location within Canton of Obwalden
- Interactive map of Maria Rickenback

Monastery information
- Order: Benedictines
- Established: 1857
- Mother house: Engelberg Abbey

People
- Prior: Prioress Sr. Maria Jacinta Rohner
- Bishop: Bishop of Chur

Architecture
- Status: In operation, 15 nuns in residence
- Completion date: 1864

Site
- Location: Niederrickenbach, Oberdorf, Obwalden, Switzerland
- Coordinates: 46.926726°N 8.427297°E
- Public access: Store and church
- Website: kloster-maria-rickenback.ch

Maria Rickenbach Monastery (German: Benediktinnerinnenkloster Maria Rickenbach) is a Benedictine monastery of Religious Sisters. It is situated in the village of Niederrickenbach in the municipality of Oberdorf in the Swiss canton of Nidwalden. It is accessible to the public only by cable car from Niederrickenbach Station on the Luzern–Stans–Engelberg railway line, although there is a private road leading up to the village from Dallenwil.

== History ==
Niederrickenbach has known a pilgrimage to Our Lady in the Maple since the 16th century, when during the time of the Reformation when images of Catholic saints were destroyed and a statue of the Virgin Mary was saved by a young shepherd. He hid the statue in a hollow maple tree on the alp. Later, unable to remove the statue, a wayside shrine was erected with the figurine in it. A chapel for the pilgrims is attested since 1565. In 1688 it was replaced by a larger one and in 1869 the present chapel was consecrated. Noteworthy is its collection of Votive offerings.

In 1857, a small group of women who wanted to follow a monastic way of life founded the monastery. There they established the practice of Perpetual Adoration as a part of their life. The monastery is often associated with Engelberg Abbey, under the guidance of which they were established and later became formally incorporated into the Benedictine Order.

Initially, the sisters lived in an old farmhouse, The monastery was built in 1862. In 1864, a school for girls was opened. After the school closed in 1981, the building became a guesthouse. In 1895, a new monastery church was built.

== Present day ==
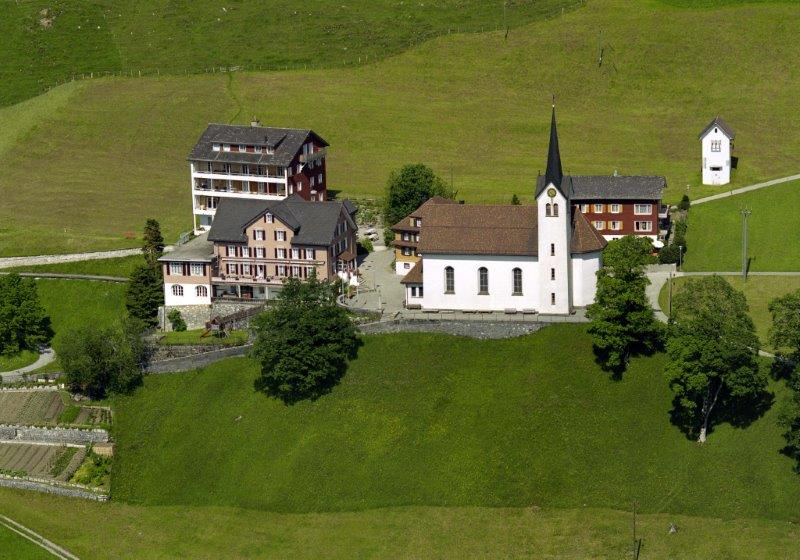
Kloster Maria-Rickenbach

As of 2023, there are fifteen sisters in the community. They follow the Rule of Saint Benedict. The sisters pray the Divine Office, celebrate Eucharist, have continual adoration of the Blessed Sacrament, and take time for other personal prayer and reading. The sisters have an herb garden and produce tea, and gold liqueur for sale in the monastery shop.

Sacred Heart Monastery in Yankton, South Dakota traces its roots to Maria Rickenbach, whose sisters first came to the United States in 1874. Benedictine missionaries had requested sisters to come and teach German immigrants. Sisters from Maria Rickenbach also founded the Benedictine Sisters of Perpetual Adoration in Nodaway County, Missouri, who now have their motherhouse in Clyde, Missouri.

The "Benedictine Way Engelberg" is a fairly demanding hiking trail linking Maria Rickenbach with Engelberg Abbey.
