= Nodaway County, Missouri =

County in Missouri, United States

- County
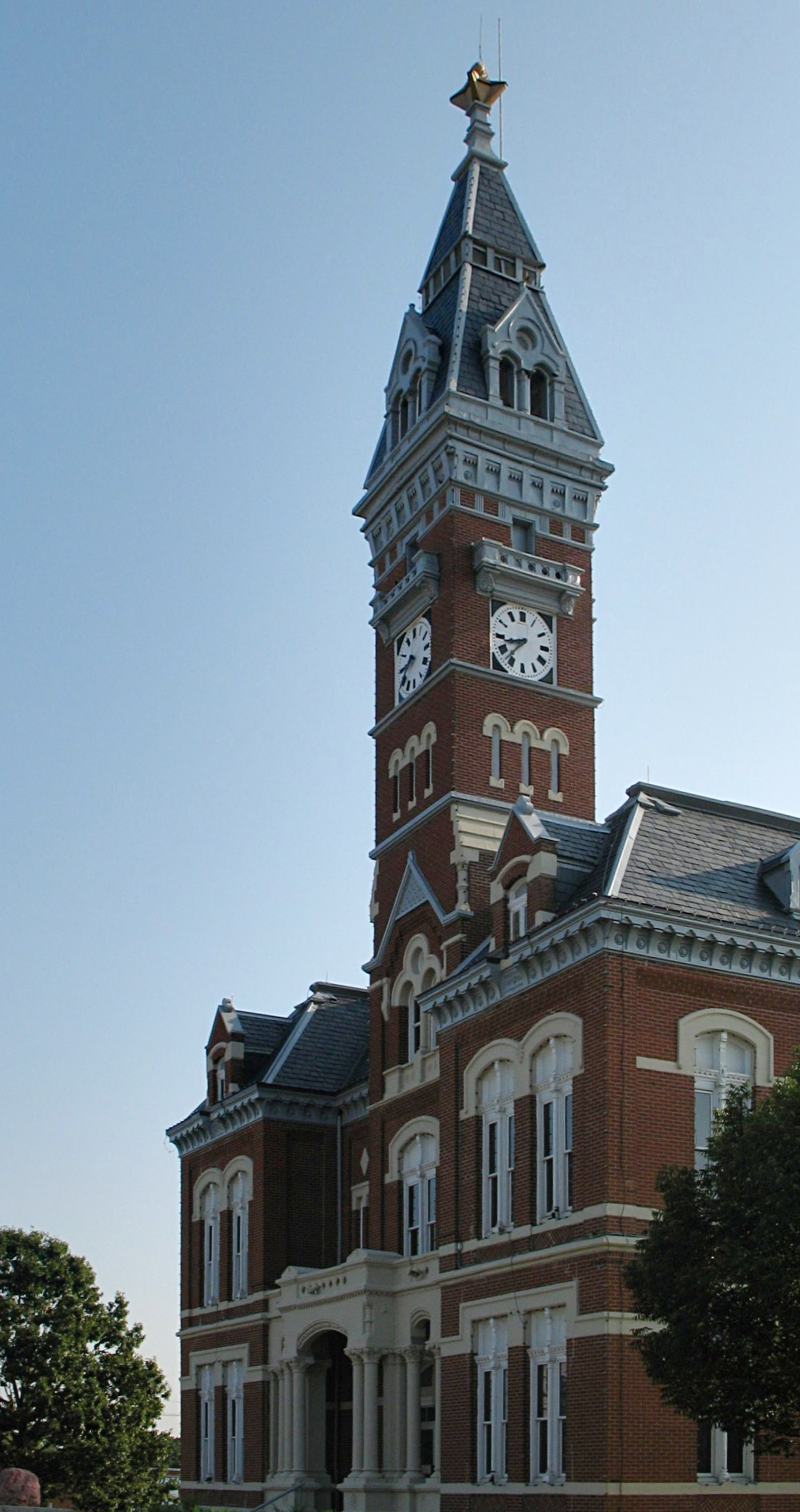
- Nodaway County Courthouse

- Location within the U.S. state of Missouri
- Coordinates: 40°22′N 94°53′W
- Country: United States
- State: Missouri
- Founded: February 14, 1845
- Named for: Nodaway River
- Seat: Maryville
- Largest city: Maryville

Area
  - Total: 878 sq mi (2,270 km^{2})
  - Land: 877 sq mi (2,270 km^{2})
  - Water: 0.9 sq mi (2.3 km^{2}) 0.1%

Population (2020)
  - Total: 21,241
  - Estimate (2025): 20,174 ▼
  - Density: 24.2/sq mi (9.35/km^{2})
- Time zone: UTC−6 (Central)
  - Summer (DST): UTC−5 (CDT)
- Congressional district: 6th
- Website: www.nodawaycountymo.com

Nodaway County is a county located in the northwest part of Missouri. As of the 2020 census, the population was 21,241. Its county seat is Maryville. The county was organized February 14, 1845, and is named for the Nodaway River. It is the largest county by area added to Missouri in the 1836 Platte Purchase and the fifth-largest county by area in Missouri.

Nodaway County comprises the Maryville, MO Micropolitan Statistical Area.

== History ==
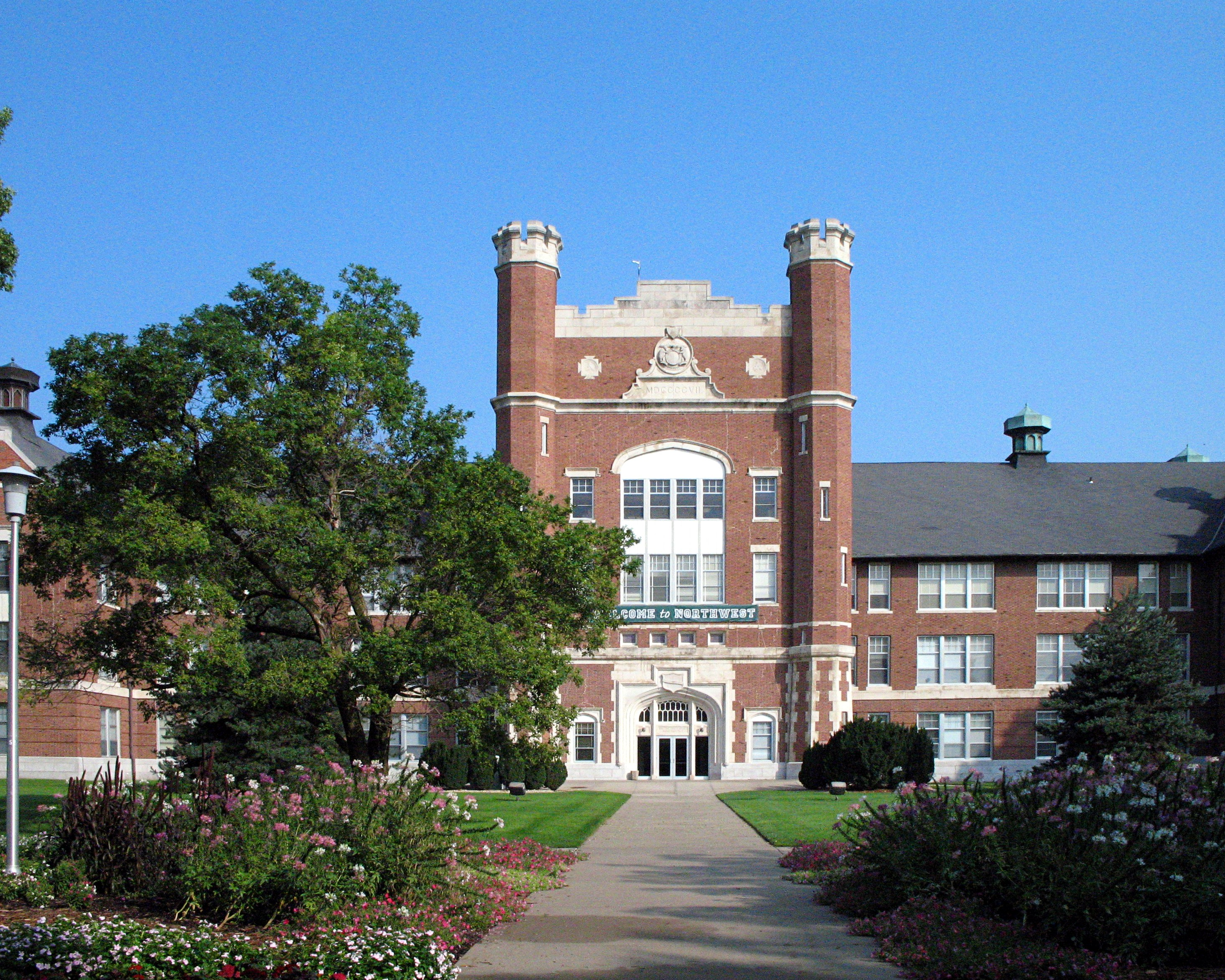
Administration Building at Northwest Missouri State University

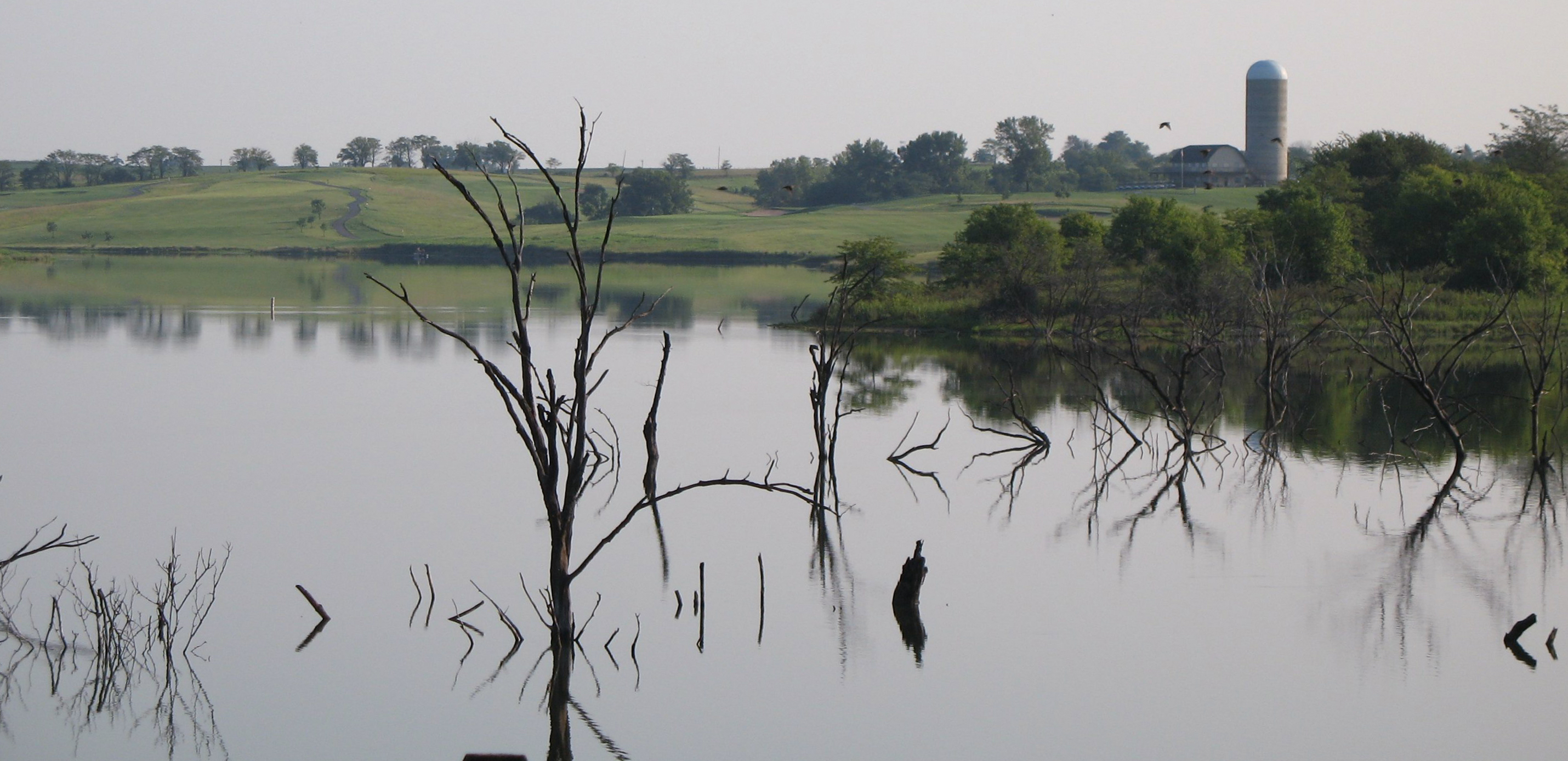
Mozingo Lake Golf Course

The county has a rich agricultural history. It is the home of trainers Ben Jones and Jimmy Jones, whose horses won six Kentucky Derby races and two Triple Crowns.

The county is home to Northwest Missouri State University. The university's grounds were a re-creation of the landscape of the 1904 St. Louis World's Fair. In 1993, Northwest was designated by the Missouri State Legislature as the official Missouri Arboretum. ESPN has carried the university's participation in five national championship football games, three of which they won.

U.S. Supreme Court Justice Clarence Thomas studied to become a priest at Conception Seminary College, before giving it up for law. The Benedictine Sisters of Perpetual Adoration convent in neighboring Clyde has 550 relics of saints, the largest collection in the nation.

Located in Tornado Alley, many tornadoes have struck the county, including an F4 tornado on March 29, 1979, which obliterated the town of Braddyville, Iowa across the county line. Tornadoes have damaged two of the county's largest buildings, the Administration Building on the campus of Northwest Missouri State University and Conception Abbey. The 1881 Hopkins tornado is one of the first recorded F5 tornadoes.

Early life in the county was chronicled by writer Homer Croy, a Nodaway County native, in many books, articles, films and Broadway shows in the 1920s and 1930s.

=== Etymology ===
The origin of the name "Nodaway" has been attributed to a Pottawatomie name for "placid," a Dakota Sioux name for "crossed without canoe," and various tribes names for "snake."

== Crime ==
Nodaway County was on the frontier in its earliest days and has a long history of violence.

The first execution in Nodaway County occurred in the county seat of Maryville on July 22, 1881. Two brothers, Albert P. and Charles E. Talbott, were hanged after being convicted of murdering their own father, Dr. Perry H. Talbott. Dr. Talbott, a local physician, newspaper editor, and state legislator, died on September 18, 1880, at his home northwest of Arkoe, a town he co-founded. He was found shot in his home and died of his injuries that evening, blaming his political enemies with his dying breath. Nevertheless, his sons were charged with the crime. Despite their insistence of innocence, the jury found them guilty and the judge sentenced them to death. Their tombstone in the family cemetery is a vertical column with two hands clasped in friendship. The inscription on the headstone reads: "We Died Inocent." [sic]

On December 9, 1884, Omaha Charley, whose real name was Joseph Paro, aka Charles F. Stephens, was the victim of a lynch mob. Six days earlier, he had shot Hubert Kremer in Hilgert's Saloon, in Maryville. Omaha Charley had been arrested, but others decided to take matters into their own hands. About 50 masked men broke into the jail and demanded Omaha Charley. The county sheriff, James Anderson, and his brother, Deputy Jack Anderson, fought the mob, firing shots and being fired upon in return. Ultimately, the mob overpowered the sheriff and his deputy, and dragged Omaha Charley from his cell. They carried Stephens to the bridge at Fourth and Water Streets, where they tied the rope to the bridge railing and threw him over the side. Sheriff Anderson found his prisoner there an hour later. This was not Omaha Charley's first crime, however. Five years earlier, he was convicted of 2nd degree murder in the death of John Mahan. He was sentenced to twelve years in prison. In January 1884, he was pardoned by Governor Thomas Crittenden and released, having served only four and a half years of his sentence.

One of the most notorious murders in Nodaway County was committed by Hezekiah "Hez" Rasco, a farmer's son, who was hanged on March 26, 1912, for the murder of Oda Hubbell. Rasco and Hubbell took part in an all-night poker game in a boxcar at the Barnard Depot. Hubbell returned to his family on the morning of November 20, 1910. The next day, Hubbell and his family were all found dead. Hubbell had been killed with a shotgun and his body dragged into the house. Mrs. Hubbell was beaten to death with the shotgun butt. After killing the children, the murderer set fire to the Hubbell home, which almost incinerated the children's corpses. Little more than half of the torso of Hubbell was found after a passing neighbor had extinguished the blaze. Hez Rasco was arrested and charged with the murder of Hubbell, his wife, and their children Welton, 4, and Jessie, 6. Rasco was tried and convicted only for Oda Hubbell's murder. Rasco maintained his innocence to his death. The murders were covered in the book Hezekiah Rasco: Child of Woe — Man of Sorrow.

Raymond Gunn was arrested for the murder and attempted rape of a young white schoolteacher. He confessed his guilt. On January 12, 1931, a mob in Maryville took Gunn from the jail and marched him to the scene of the crime. They tied him to the school roof and set fire to the building, burning Gunn to death.

On the night of October 10, 1972, Benedict “Benny” Kemper, 15 years old, cut the telephone line to the Marion Merrigan family’s house that was situated west of Conception, sneaked into the basement and waited for the family to go to sleep. Once the family was asleep, Kemper went upstairs and went from bedroom to bedroom murdering four members: Marion, the father; Kathleen, the mother; William, his classmate and their son; and Helen Ann, their youngest daughter, using a .22 bolt-action rifle. The lone surviving family member, Sue Merrigan Dorrel, was a student at Northwest Missouri State University in Maryville at the time. She is an aunt of former Northwest Missouri State University football coach Adam Dorrel. In 1973, Kemper was sentenced to four consecutive 45-year sentences for murder and an additional six years for an attempted jail escape.

On the night of August 4, 1973, Teresa "Tessie" Hilt, a student at Northwest Missouri State, was strangled and stabbed to death in her off-campus apartment in Maryville, and found the next day in her blood-soaked bed by friends. This crime has never been solved and is still considered an open/cold case by the Maryville Department of Public Safety.

On July 10, 1981, several unknown people killed Ken McElroy, in the middle of Skidmore, in what is one of the county's best-kept secrets. An abusive man suspected of many crimes and convicted of attempted murder, McElroy was shot in his truck in Skidmore's main street, in full view of a crowd. The different caliber bullets showed there had been several people involved. However, when questioned by the county sheriff, everyone insisted they had ducked under the pool table in the local bar and saw nothing. Sheriff Danny Estes remarked, "That must have been the biggest damn pool table in the world." A local and federal law enforcement task force was set up to investigate the crime, but they could not find anyone willing to step forward to discuss the crime. The book and movie In Broad Daylight are based on this event.

In 1990, BATF informant Christine Elkins disappeared. She was beaten to death by cousins Tony and Steven "Tug" Emery, joined by an unnamed associate. Elkins' body was wrapped in a carpet rug, thrown into the trunk of her car, and driven to the Missouri River. The Emerys used a board to hold the steering column in place and another piece to hold down the accelerator, and ran the car off a boat ramp near Nodaway. The car was found in 1997, with Elkins' bones in the trunk. Dental records identified the remains. Tony Emery was sentenced to life imprisonment without possibility of parole, and is currently incarcerated at United States Penitentiary (USP) in Terre Haute, Indiana. He appealed the conviction, which was affirmed in 1999. Tug Emery is incarcerated on charges related to the murder at Federal Correctional Institution in Sandstone, Minnesota and has a projected release date of June 21, 2016.

In the fall of 1994, a local farmer, William Taylor, murdered his wife Debra, by using the family's cat to lure her underneath a combine and causing the combine to roll over her. Taylor told authorities that he had killed the cat with a hammer and threw it under the combine, to lure his wife under the machine. Once she was under the combine attempting to retrieve the cat, he used twine to pull a lever on the combine, to cause it to roll over his wife when she tried to retrieve it. After he ran over her, he stated that he had moved the combine back from his wife's body, hid the twine and called 9-1-1, stating that there had been an accident at his farm south of Maryville. Taylor was convicted of murder and received a 25-year sentence.

In the spring of 1995, Dennis Lee Jones, of Maryville, assaulted and murdered Karen Hawkins, a student at Northwest Missouri State, and a friend of his since high school at Maryville. Jones sexually assaulted her, killed her by strangulation and stomping/kicking her, then dumped her body in the 102 River east of Maryville, near the Maryville City Dog Pound, where it was recovered days later downstream by the Missouri State Water Patrol (now part of the Missouri State Highway Patrol). Before Jones could go to trial, he hanged himself in the Nodaway County Jail.

On October 16, 2000, Greg N. Dragoo beat and dragged his girlfriend, Wendy Gillenwater, down several country roads outside of Skidmore, causing her to die. Gillenwater's body was found outside her Skidmore home. Dragoo was charged with murder and given a life sentence by a Nodaway County judge. Dragoo is currently incarcerated in the Jefferson City Correctional Center.

On April 11, 2001, Branson Perry was last seen in his home in the 300 block of West Oak Street in Skidmore, at around 3:00 p.m. He went outside to put some jumper cables in a shed. He never returned, and has never been heard from again. The Missouri State Highway Patrol and the Nodaway County Sheriff's Office still have an open/active case on this.

On June 10, 2002, 71-year-old Lloyd Robert Jeffress, of Kearney, wielding two semi-automatic rifles, opened fire in the hallways of the Conception Abbey, murdering two monks and wounding two others, before committing suicide in the chapel. The victims were identified as the Rev. Philip Schuster, 85, and Brother Damian Larson, 64. Schuster was a greeter at the monastery's front door; Larson worked as a weatherman/groundskeeper. The Rev. Kenneth Reichert, 68, an assistant to the abbot, was shot in the stomach and was in serious condition. The Rev. Norbert Schappler, 73, who was shot twice, was listed in stable condition. Schappler oversees the dining room and works as director at the printing house.

On December 16, 2004, Bobbie Jo Stinnett was murdered in her home in Skidmore, and had her unborn baby cut from her womb. Lisa Montgomery was located (along with the baby named Victoria Jo) due to computer forensic evidence, in Melvern, Kansas, where she was arrested by the FBI, a Maryville Public Safety Detective, and a detective from the Cameron Police Dept. Montgomery was convicted of Stinnett's murder and sentenced to death in 2007 by a Federal Court in the Western District of Missouri. Victoria Jo was re-united with her father Zeb. Montgomery was executed on January 13, 2021.

On January 11, 2006, a natural gas leak caused a house in Maryville to explode around 9pm that evening. Two of the three residents, 93 year old Lois Hall and her 69 year old son Carroll Hall, were killed in the explosion. The third resident, son and brother 49 year old Donald Hall, was seriously injured and found by rescue crews crawling out of the debris. He was flown to the University of Kansas hospital in Kansas City, Kansas.

On January 27, 2007, a catastrophic fire severely damaged the Carson apartment complex on the corner of 1st St and Buchanan St in downtown Maryville. The fire, which was started when food was left cooking unattended on a stove, claimed the lives of Brandon C. Kaut aged 22, and Derick A. Schafer aged 28. Another man, 21 year old Ibrahim Qaoud, was seriously injured as a result of the fire. He recovered at a Kansas City hospital.

On November 16, 2007, Erik B. Romig and Nicholas A. Rosencrans, both of Maryville, got into an altercation with Donald Ray Gardner Jr, also of Maryville, over $40 at a house on the east side of town. Gardner was taken from the house, beaten, then dragged to a field 1–2 blocks away, where he was left to die. Roming and Rosencrans were found guilty and both sentenced to seven years in prison for manslaughter.

On December 3, 2007, Jorge Saavedra Pere, of Saint Joseph, fatally shot his roommate, Jamie Zamudio-Hernandez, in the kitchen of the Mandarin Restaurant in Maryville, where they both worked, over a money dispute. Saavedra fled the scene in a stolen car and was found several days later by authorities near Mankato, Minnesota, on foot after the vehicle he stole ran out of gas. Saavedra was found guilty of voluntary manslaughter in a Nodaway County court and sentenced to 12 years in a Missouri prison.

On October 29, 2011, three people were killed and four people were injured in a motor vehicle accident on Missouri Highway 246, half a mile east of Hopkins, when the driver over-corrected after losing control of his pick-up, causing it to flip over several times, then catch fire in a field. The victims were 21-year-old Joshua Bix and 22-year-old Benjamin McIntyre, both of Hopkins, Missouri, and 18-year-old Chrystal Olerich of Lake View, Iowa. All three were thrown from the pickup, and none were wearing seatbelts. The driver of the pickup, 22-year-old Scott R. Woods, of Hopkins, and three other victims, were tossed from the truck and seriously injured, but survived. Woods was sentenced on January 9, 2013, to 10 years in a Missouri prison for two felony counts of involuntary manslaughter and three charges of felony assault.

On September 13, 2012, Kevin Dell Mooney, 31, and Tony Overlin, 23, both of Bethany, ambushed Northwest Missouri State University student Tomarken Smith, 21, of Jennings, outside a local bar as Smith exited the establishment. Mooney and Overlin attacked and beat him, knocking him to the sidewalk. Smith fell, struck his head on the pavement, and was knocked unconscious, causing him to stop breathing. Maryville Public Safety Officers were on scene within seconds of the altercation and immediately began CPR, but were unable to revive him. Smith was pronounced dead at 2:21 a.m. Mooney and Overlin were picked up moments after the altercation by other Maryville Public Safety Officers and taken into custody, and booked into the Nodaway County Jail. They were both charged with second-degree murder and first-degree assault On September 3, 2013, Mooney pleaded guilty to involuntary manslaughter in Atchison County Circuit Court for his role in the death. On September 4, 2013, in the Circuit Court of Buchanan County, Overlin was sentenced to serve six years in prison by Judge Patrick Robb, after Overlin was found guilty of the Class C felony of involuntary manslaughter. On September 30, 2013, Mooney was sentenced to six years in prison. "Both Law Enforcement and Tomarken's family were involved from the very beginning and agreed the final outcome of this case was just and appropriate," said Robert Rice, Prosecuting Attorney of Nodaway County, Missouri. Tomarken's family and several law enforcement officials attended the court hearing.

In January 2012, 17-year-old boy from Maryville, Missouri was arrested for the rape and sexual assault of Daisy Coleman, then 14. A 15-year-old boy was accused of doing the same to Coleman's 13-year-old friend, and a third boy admitted to recording the assault on a cellphone. A significant controversy arose in 2013 when the county prosecutor dropped felony and misdemeanor charges against the first boy, who was related to Rex Barnett, an influential former state representative, and the Nodaway County prosecutor Robert Rice dropped the felony sexual exploitation charge against the third boy.

On June 27, 2013, Steve Parsons, owner of Parsons Tires in Maryville and Stanberry, committed suicide in a Nodaway County Courthouse courtroom, using a cyanide capsule that he had purchased online several days before. Parsons secretly slid the capsule into his mouth, after hearing he would be sent to prison for seven years for being guilty of the statutory sodomy of a 14-year-old girl, who was babysitter to his children. Parsons had a seizure in court and was transported by EMS to Heartland Regional Hospital ER in Saint Joseph. While en route, Parsons went into cardiac arrest, and was pronounced dead by the local coroner upon arrival.

On September 6, 2013, Matthew Rouch, 57, of Maryville, an instructor of Mass Media at Northwest Missouri State University, was arrested after staff from the Mass Media Department notified University Police of a Facebook post, where Mr. Rouch threatened, “By October, I’ll be wanting to get up to the top of the bell tower with a high-powered rifle, with a good scope and probably a Gatling gun as well." University Police and the Nodaway County Sheriff's Department determined the comment was made in jest, but discovered a sophisticated marijuana growing operation in the process of searching Mr. Rouch’s house, after Rouch made a statement that there "was a bomb in a brief case at his house." Rouch was charged with one count of felony production of a controlled substance, and one count of felony possession of a controlled substance. The university placed Rouch on administrative leave, pending the outcome of an internal investigation. Other professors will assume Rouch’s teaching duties in the interim. Rouch appeared in Nodaway County Circuit Court for his initial arraignment October 8, 2013. He will return to court November 12, 2013. However, the warrant was ultimately declared illegal when it was found that Clarence Green, the campus Chief of Police, had withheld critical information and that there was no probable cause. Although that decision was appealed, a three judge appeals court unanimously ruled in Rouch's favor, and the charges were dismissed.

== Geography ==
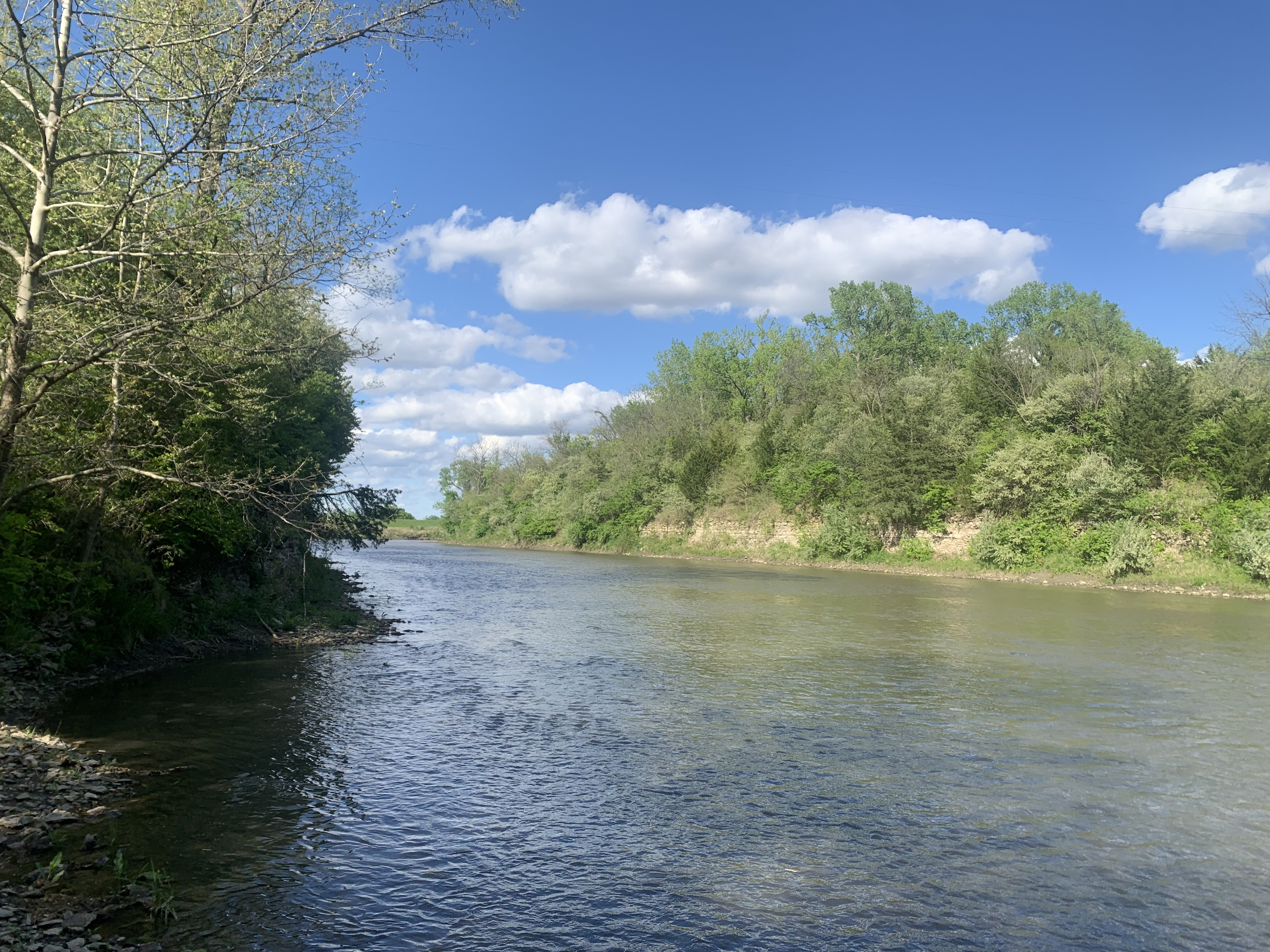
One Hundred and Two River at Bridgewater Access southwest of Arkoe.

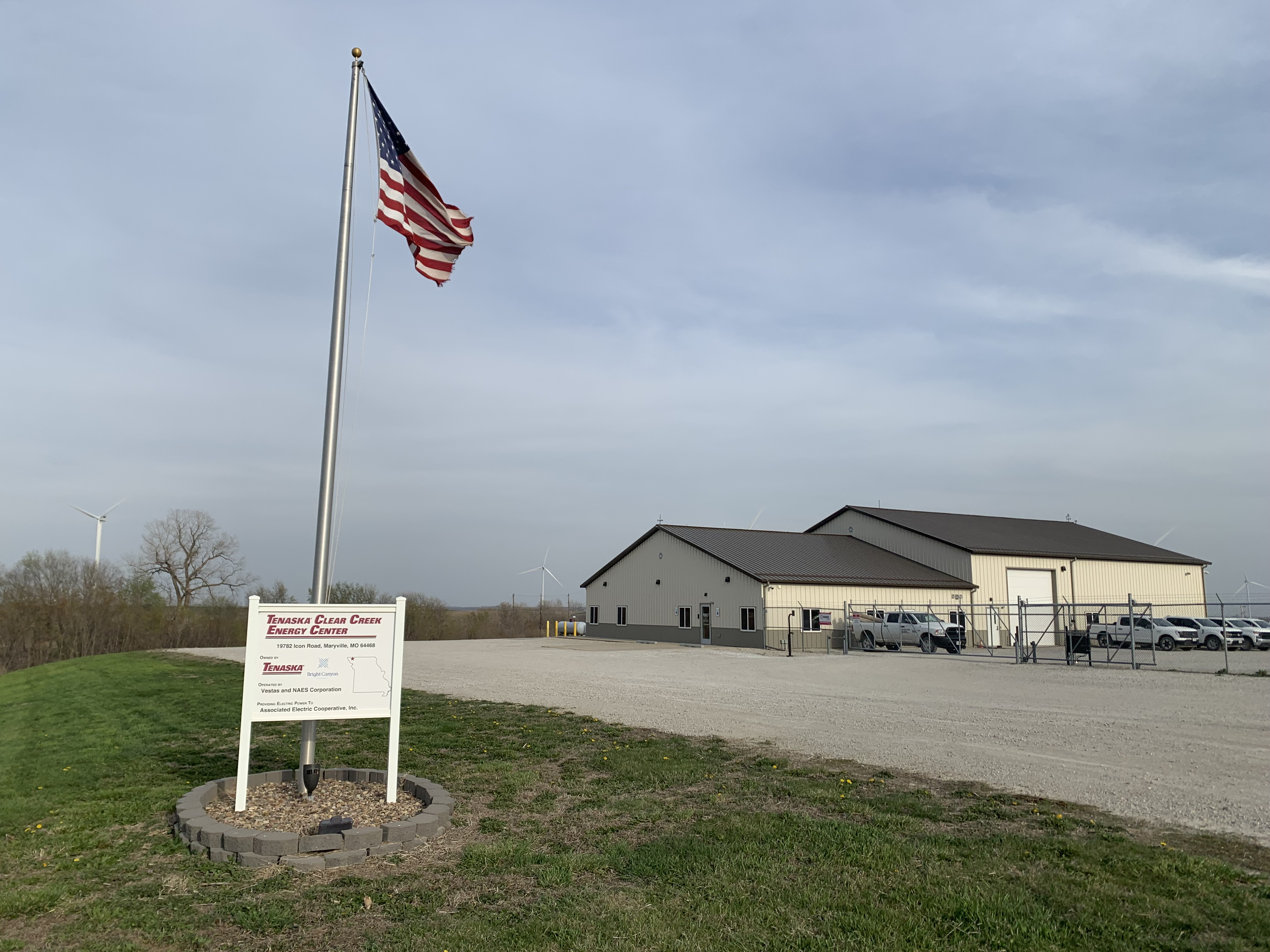
Headquarters of Clear Creek Energy Center in Union Township.

According to the U.S. Census Bureau, the county has a total area of 878 square miles (2,270 km^{2}), of which 877 square miles (2,270 km^{2}) is land and 0.9 square miles (2.3 km^{2}) (0.1%) is water. It is the fifth-largest county in Missouri by area. Iowa forms the northern border of Nodaway County.

Nodaway County consists of undulating hills with three notable rivers. The eponymous Nodaway River partitions the western half of the county and forms part of its southwestern border with Holt County. The One Hundred and Two River divides the county in half and the eastern portion of Maryville covers its western plain. The Platte River traverses the easternmost portion of the county. Mozingo Lake is a large reservoir located 5 miles east of Maryville.

Nodaway County is home to two wind farms. Tenaska Clear Creek Energy Center is a 242-megawatt wind farm containing 111 wind turbines located northwest of Maryville and directly west of Pickering. The 236.5-megawatt White Cloud Wind Farm is located southwest of Maryville and north of Graham.

=== Adjacent counties ===
- Page County, Iowa (northwest)
- Taylor County, Iowa (north)
- Worth County (northeast)
- Gentry County (southeast)
- Andrew County (south)
- Holt County (southwest)
- Atchison County (west)

== Demographics ==
Historical population
Census	Pop.	Note	%±
1850	2,318		—
1860	5,232		125.7%
1870	14,751		181.9%
1880	29,544		100.3%
1890	30,914		4.6%
1900	32,938		6.5%
1910	28,833		−12.5%
1920	27,744		−3.8%
1930	26,371		−4.9%
1940	25,556		−3.1%
1950	24,033		−6.0%
1960	22,215		−7.6%
1970	22,467		1.1%
1980	21,196		−5.7%
1990	21,709		2.4%
2000	21,912		0.9%
2010	23,370		6.7%
2020	21,241		−9.1%
2025 (est.)	20,174	▼	−5.0%
U.S. Decennial Census; 1790–1960 1900–1990; 1990–2000 2010

=== 2020 census ===
As of the 2020 census, the county had a population of 21,241, a median age of 33.4 years, and 19.9% of residents were under the age of 18 while 17.1% of residents were 65 years of age or older. For every 100 females there were 99.8 males, and for every 100 females age 18 and over there were 98.5 males age 18 and over.

The racial makeup of the county was 91.6% White, 1.7% Black or African American, 0.2% American Indian and Alaska Native, 1.9% Asian, 0.0% Native Hawaiian and Pacific Islander, 0.6% from some other race, and 3.9% from two or more races. Hispanic or Latino residents of any race comprised 2.0% of the population.

Nodaway County, Missouri – Racial and ethnic composition Note: the US Census treats Hispanic/Latino as an ethnic category. This table excludes Latinos from the racial categories and assigns them to a separate category. Hispanics/Latinos may be of any race.
Race / Ethnicity (NH = Non-Hispanic)	Pop 1980	Pop 1990	Pop 2000	Pop 2010	Pop 2020	% 1980	% 1990	% 2000	% 2010	% 2020
White alone (NH)	21,637	21,203	21,067	21,881	19,290	98.37%	97.67%	96.14%	93.63%	90.81%
Black or African American alone (NH)	88	164	294	563	363	0.40%	0.76%	1.34%	2.41%	1.71%
Native American or Alaska Native alone (NH)	32	38	50	41	31	0.15%	0.18%	0.23%	0.18%	0.15%
Asian alone (NH)	90	164	189	377	390	0.41%	0.76%	0.86%	1.61%	1.84%
Native Hawaiian or Pacific Islander alone (NH)	x	x	5	3	2	x	x	0.02%	0.01%	0.01%
Other race alone (NH)	37	5	7	11	46	0.17%	0.02%	0.03%	0.05%	0.22%
Mixed race or Multiracial (NH)	x	x	145	192	692	x	x	0.66%	0.82%	3.26%
Hispanic or Latino (any race)	112	135	155	302	427	0.51%	0.62%	0.71%	1.29%	2.01%
Total	21,996	21,709	21,912	23,370	21,241	100.00%	100.00%	100.00%	100.00%	100.00%

52.8% of residents lived in urban areas, while 47.2% lived in rural areas.

There were 8,376 households in the county, of which 25.5% had children under the age of 18 living with them and 26.7% had a female householder with no spouse or partner present. About 32.1% of all households were made up of individuals and 12.2% had someone living alone who was 65 years of age or older.

There were 9,449 housing units, of which 11.4% were vacant. Among occupied housing units, 61.0% were owner-occupied and 39.0% were renter-occupied. The homeowner vacancy rate was 1.1% and the rental vacancy rate was 9.3%.

=== 2000 census ===
As of the 2000 census, there were 21,912 people, 8,138 households, and 4,817 families residing in the county. The population density was 25 people per square mile (9.7 people/km^{2}). There were 8,909 housing units at an average density of 10 units per square mile (3.9/km^{2}). The racial makeup of the county was 96.58% White, 1.35% Black or African American, 0.23% Native American, 0.87% Asian, 0.02% Pacific Islander, 0.21% from other races, and 0.74% from two or more races. Approximately 0.71% of the population were Hispanic or Latino of any race.

There were 8,138 households, out of which 27.30% had children under the age of 18 living with them, 50.00% were married couples living together, 6.20% had a female householder with no husband present, and 40.80% were non-families. 30.00% of all households were made up of individuals, and 11.60% had someone living alone who was 65 years of age or older. The average household size was 2.33 and the average family size was 2.94.

In the county, the population was spread out, with 19.40% under the age of 18, 25.10% from 18 to 24, 23.10% from 25 to 44, 18.60% from 45 to 64, and 13.80% who were 65 years of age or older. The median age was 30 years. For every 100 females there were 99.70 males. For every 100 females age 18 and over, there were 97.00 males.

The median income for a household in the county was $31,781, and the median income for a family was $42,203. Males had a median income of $28,388 versus $21,267 for females. The per capita income for the county was $15,384. About 8.30% of families and 16.50% of the population were below the poverty line, including 11.20% of those under age 18 and 13.30% of those age 65 or over.

== Transportation ==
=== Major highways ===
- U.S. Route 71
- U.S. Route 136
- Route 46
- Route 113
- Route 148
- Route 246

=== Transit ===
- Jefferson Lines

=== Airports ===
Nodaway County is served by two airports. Northwest Missouri Regional Airport and Rankin Airport, both just outside of Maryville. Both airports are for general aviation with no commercial service.

== Education ==
School districts covering this county, including ones with their schools and/or headquarters in other counties, include:

- Jefferson C-123 School District
- Maryville R-II Schools
- Northeast Nodaway County R-V School District
- North Nodaway County R-VI School District
- Nodaway-Holt R-VII School District
- South Nodaway County R-IV School District
- Stanberry R-II School District
- West Nodaway County R-I School District
- Worth County R-III School District

=== Public schools ===
- Jefferson C-123 School District – Conception Junction
  - Jefferson Elementary School (PK-06)
  - Jefferson High School (07-12)
- Maryville R-II School District – Maryville
  - Maryville Early Childhood Center (PK)
  - Eugene Field Elementary School (K-04)
  - Maryville Middle School (05-08)
  - Maryville High School (09-12)
- Nodaway-Holt R-VII School District – Graham
  - Nodaway-Holt Elementary School (K-06)
  - Nodaway-Holt Junior/Senior High School (07-12)
- North Nodaway County R-VI School District – Hopkins
  - North Nodaway County Elementary School (PK-05)
  - North Nodaway County Junior/Senior High School (06-12)
- Northeast Nodaway County R-V School District – Ravenwood
  - Parnell Elementary School (PK-06)
  - Northeast Nodaway County High School (07-12)
- South Nodaway County R-IV School District – Barnard
  - South Nodaway County Elementary School (PK-06)
  - South Nodaway County High School (07-12)
- West Nodaway County R-I School District – Burlington Junction
  - West Nodaway County Elementary School (PK-06)
  - West Nodaway County High School (07-12)

=== Private schools ===
- St. Gregory Barbarigo School – Maryville (K-09) – Catholic

=== Post-secondary ===
- Northwest Missouri State University – Maryville – A public, four-year university.

=== Public libraries ===
- Maryville Public Library

== Points of interest ==
- Bilby Ranch Lake Conversation Area
- Benedictine Sisters of Perpetual Adoration
- Conception Abbey
- Maryville Treatment Center
- Missouri State Arboretum
- Mozingo Lake
- Nodaway County Historical Society Museum

== Media ==
The four licensed broadcast stations originating in the county broadcast from Maryville:

- KNIM – 1580 – AM
- KVVL – 97.1 – FM
- KXCV – 90.5 – FM
- KZLX-FM – 106.7 – FM

== Communities ==
=== Cities ===
- Barnard
- Burlington Junction
- Clearmont
- Conception Junction
- Elmo
- Graham
- Hopkins
- Maryville (county seat)
- Parnell
- Pickering
- Ravenwood
- Skidmore

=== Villages ===
- Arkoe
- Clyde
- Guilford

=== Census-designated places ===
- Conception
- Quitman

=== Unincorporated Community ===
- Wilcox

=== Extinct Communities ===
- Allison
- Bedison
- Bell Grove
- Dawsonville
- Fairview
- Gaynor
- Orrsburg
- Prairie Park
- Possum Walk
- Pumpkin Center
- Roseberry
- Sweet Home
- Xenia
- Whitecloud

=== Townships ===
- Atchison
- Grant
- Green
- Hopkins
- Hughes
- Independence
- Jackson
- Jefferson
- Lincoln
- Monroe
- Nodaway
- Polk
- Union
- Washington
- White Cloud

=== Population ranking ===
The population ranking of the following table is based on the 2020 census of Nodaway County.

† county seat

Rank	Name	Municipal Type	Population
1	Maryville †	3rd Class City	10,633
2	Burlington Junction	4th Class City	521
3	Hopkins	4th Class City	472
4	Ravenwood	4th Class City	439
5	Skidmore	4th Class City	245
6	Barnard	4th Class City	201
7	Conception Junction	3rd Class City	175
8	Clearmont	4th Class City	158
9	Pickering	4th Class City	149
10	Graham	4th Class City	147
11	Parnell	4th Class City	135
12	Elmo	4th Class City	114
13	Conception	CDP	111
14	Guilford	Village	60
15	Arkoe	Village	56
16	Clyde	Village	55
17	Quitman	CDP	42

== Notable residents ==
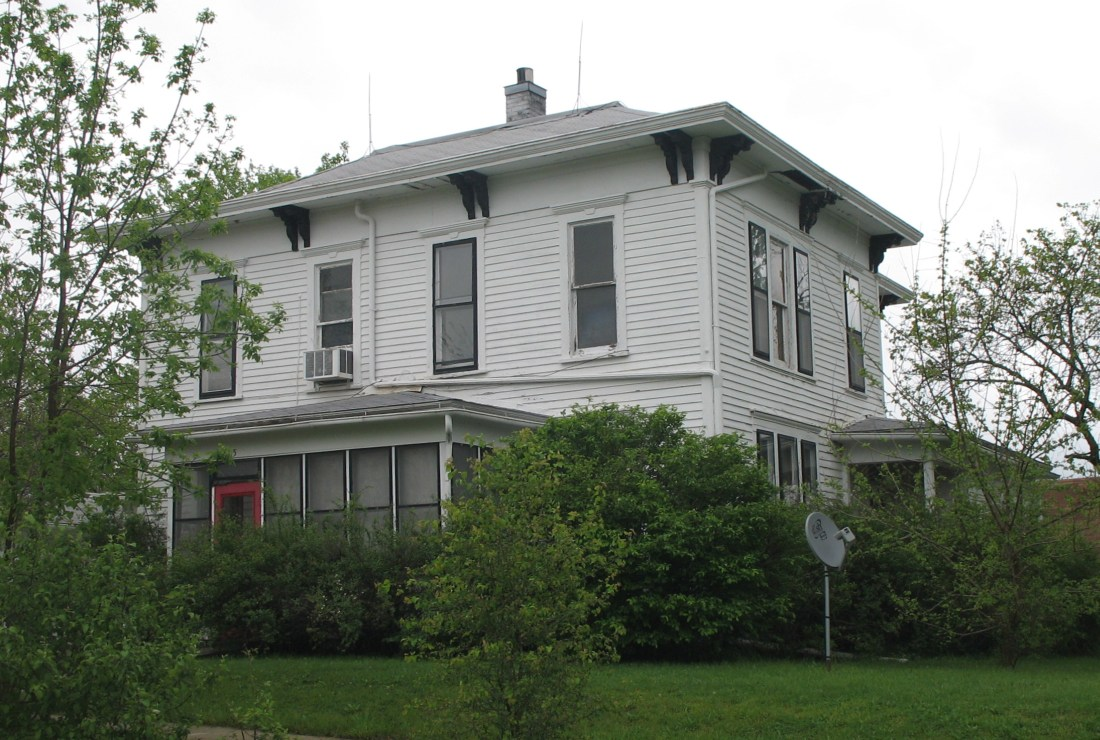
Maryville Governor's Mansion where both Albert Morehouse and Forrest Donnell lived.

- Sarah Caldwell (1924–2006) – Boston was an American opera conductor, impresario, and stage director.
- Dale Carnegie (1888–1955) – author of How to Win Friends and Influence People
- Charles J. Colden (1870–1938) – U.S. Representative
- Homer Croy (1883–1965) – author and screenwriter who wrote about life in Maryville
- Albert David (1902–1945) – Medal of Honor winner for capture of U-505 during World War II
- Forrest C. Donnell (1884–1980) – native of Quitman; Republican Governor from 1941 to 1945 and U.S. Senator from 1945 to 1951
- Herbert Hoover (1874–1964) – President of the United States; was never a true county resident, but he owned a farm south of Graham
- Ben A. Jones (1882–1961) and his son Horace A. "Jimmy" Jones (1906–2001) had a farm near Parnell and retired there. During their tenure at Calumet Farm, they trained six Kentucky Derby and two Triple Crown winners. Extensive memorabilia from the racing days are in the Nodaway County Historical Society Museum.
- Henry L. Jost (1873–1950) – Mayor of Kansas City, who arrived in Hopkins aboard an orphan train
- Edward H. Moore (1871–1950) – U.S. Senator from Oklahoma
- Albert P. Morehouse (1835–1891) – Maryville resident who succeeded to Governor from 1887 to 1889
- Harley Race (1943–2019) – professional wrestler
- Marcus Morton Rhoades (1903–1991) – cytogeneticist
- Grant Wallace (1867–1954) – writer of the occult
- Jerry Wallace (1928–2008) – pop-country singer and actor

== Politics ==
=== Local ===
The Republican Party is predominate at the local level in Nodaway County. Republicans hold all but two of the elected positions in the county.

Nodaway County, Missouri

Elected countywide officials
Assessor	Rex Wallace	Democratic
Circuit Clerk	Elaine Wilson	Republican
County Clerk	Melinda Patton	Republican
Collector	Marilyn Jenkins	Democratic
Commissioner (presiding)	Bill Walker	Republican
Commissioner (district 1)	Chris Burns	Republican
Commissioner (district 2)	Scott A. Walk	Republican
Coroner	Vince Shelby	Republican
Prosecuting Attorney	Tina Deiter	Republican
Public Administrator	Dee O’Riley	Republican
Recorder	Lisa Nickerson	Republican
Sheriff	Randy Strong	Republican
Surveyor	Adam Teale	Republican
Treasurer	Marilyn Jenkins	Democratic

=== State ===
Past Gubernatorial Elections Results
Year	Republican	Democratic	Third Parties
2024	71.49% 6,869	26.78% 2,573	1.74% 167
2020	70.08% 6,900	28.02% 2,759	1.09% 187
2016	61.51% 5,790	35.80% 3,370	2.69% 253
2012	46.24% 4,118	50.77% 4,522	2.99% 266
2008	42.50% 4,254	54.13% 5,418	3.37% 337
2004	54.08% 5,424	44.43% 4,456	1.50% 150
2000	48.04% 4,294	49.50% 4,425	2.46% 220
1996	30.03% 2,525	67.50% 5,676	2.47% 208

All of Nodaway County is a part of Missouri’s 1st District in the Missouri House of Representatives and is represented by Allen Andrews (R-Grant City).

Missouri House of Representatives — District 1 — Nodaway County (2016)
Party	Candidate	Votes	%	±%
Republican	Allen Andrews	8,488	100.00%	+23.45

Missouri House of Representatives — District 1 — Nodaway County (2014)
Party	Candidate	Votes	%	±%
Republican	Allen Andrews	4,292	76.55%	−23.45
Democratic	Robert L. Ritterbusch	1,315	23.45%	+23.45

Missouri House of Representatives — District 1 — Nodaway County (2012)
Party	Candidate	Votes	%	±%
Republican	Mike Thomson	8,258	100.00%	

All of Nodaway County is a part of Missouri’s 12th District in the Missouri Senate and is currently represented by Dan Hegeman (R-Cosby).

Missouri Senate — District 12 — Nodaway County (2014)
Party	Candidate	Votes	%	±%
Republican	Dan Hegeman	4,743	100.00	

=== Federal ===
U.S. Senate — Missouri — Nodaway County (2016)
Party	Candidate	Votes	%	±%
Republican	Roy Blunt	5,516	58.65%	+18.83
Democratic	Jason Kander	3,466	36.85%	−15.48
Libertarian	Jonathan Dine	208	2.21%	−5.64
Green	Johnathan McFarland	104	1.11%	+1.11
Constitution	Fred Ryman	111	1.18%	+1.18

U.S. Senate — Missouri — Nodaway County (2012)
Party	Candidate	Votes	%	±%
Republican	Todd Akin	3,543	39.82	
Democratic	Claire McCaskill	4,656	52.33	
Libertarian	Jonathan Dine	698	7.85	

All of Nodaway County is included in Missouri’s 6th Congressional District and is currently represented by Sam Graves (R-Tarkio) in the U.S. House of Representatives.

U.S. House of Representatives — Missouri's 6th Congressional District — Nodaway County (2016)
Party	Candidate	Votes	%	±%
Republican	Sam Graves	6,805	72.99%	+4.07
Democratic	David M. Blackwell	2,246	24.09%	−3.60
Libertarian	Russ Lee Monchil	188	2.02%	−1.37
Green	Mike Diel	84	0.90%	+0.90

U.S. House of Representatives — Missouri’s 6th Congressional District — Nodaway County (2014)
Party	Candidate	Votes	%	±%
Republican	Sam Graves	3,878	68.92%	−1.25
Democratic	Bill Hedge	1,558	27.69%	+0.26
Libertarian	Russ Lee Monchil	191	3.39%	+0.99

U.S. House of Representatives — Missouri's 6th Congressional District — Nodaway County (2012)
Party	Candidate	Votes	%	±%
Republican	Sam Graves	6,224	70.17%	
Democratic	Kyle Yarber	2,433	27.43%	
Libertarian	Russ Lee Monchil	213	2.40%	

United States presidential election results for Nodaway County, Missouri
Year	Republican		Democratic		Third party(ies)	
Year	No.	%	No.	%	No.	%
1888	3,016	46.06%	2,989	45.65%	543	8.29%
1892	2,878	41.98%	2,913	42.49%	1,065	15.53%
1896	3,437	42.56%	4,577	56.68%	61	0.76%
1900	3,858	47.62%	4,055	50.05%	189	2.33%
1904	3,875	52.34%	3,356	45.33%	173	2.34%
1908	3,592	49.12%	3,595	49.16%	126	1.72%
1912	2,139	30.33%	3,490	49.49%	1,423	20.18%
1916	3,540	47.15%	3,874	51.60%	94	1.25%
1920	6,971	55.80%	5,404	43.26%	118	0.94%
1924	6,242	49.85%	5,803	46.35%	476	3.80%
1928	7,160	57.40%	5,297	42.46%	17	0.14%
1932	3,584	33.80%	6,959	65.64%	59	0.56%
1936	5,817	43.41%	7,499	55.97%	83	0.62%
1940	6,759	50.21%	6,696	49.74%	6	0.04%
1944	5,766	51.57%	5,407	48.36%	7	0.06%
1948	4,886	43.78%	6,253	56.03%	22	0.20%
1952	7,614	61.20%	4,805	38.62%	22	0.18%
1956	6,381	54.30%	5,371	45.70%	0	0.00%
1960	5,993	52.98%	5,318	47.02%	0	0.00%
1964	3,789	36.16%	6,690	63.84%	0	0.00%
1968	4,736	48.11%	4,494	45.65%	615	6.25%
1972	5,942	64.14%	3,322	35.86%	0	0.00%
1976	4,558	47.81%	4,875	51.13%	101	1.06%
1980	4,544	48.91%	4,257	45.82%	489	5.26%
1984	5,471	60.21%	3,615	39.79%	0	0.00%
1988	4,103	48.92%	4,240	50.55%	44	0.52%
1992	3,147	33.52%	3,723	39.66%	2,518	26.82%
1996	3,362	39.74%	3,966	46.87%	1,133	13.39%
2000	5,161	57.03%	3,553	39.26%	335	3.70%
2004	6,226	61.53%	3,830	37.85%	63	0.62%
2008	5,568	54.49%	4,493	43.97%	158	1.55%
2012	5,593	62.31%	3,172	35.34%	211	2.35%
2016	6,380	67.46%	2,529	26.74%	549	5.80%
2020	6,865	69.39%	2,853	28.84%	175	1.77%
2024	6,909	71.31%	2,674	27.60%	106	1.09%

== See also ==
- National Register of Historic Places listings in Nodaway County, Missouri
