= Benedictine Sisters of Perpetual Adoration =

Benedictine monastery in Clyde, Missouri

Coordinates: 40.26895°N 94.668889°W

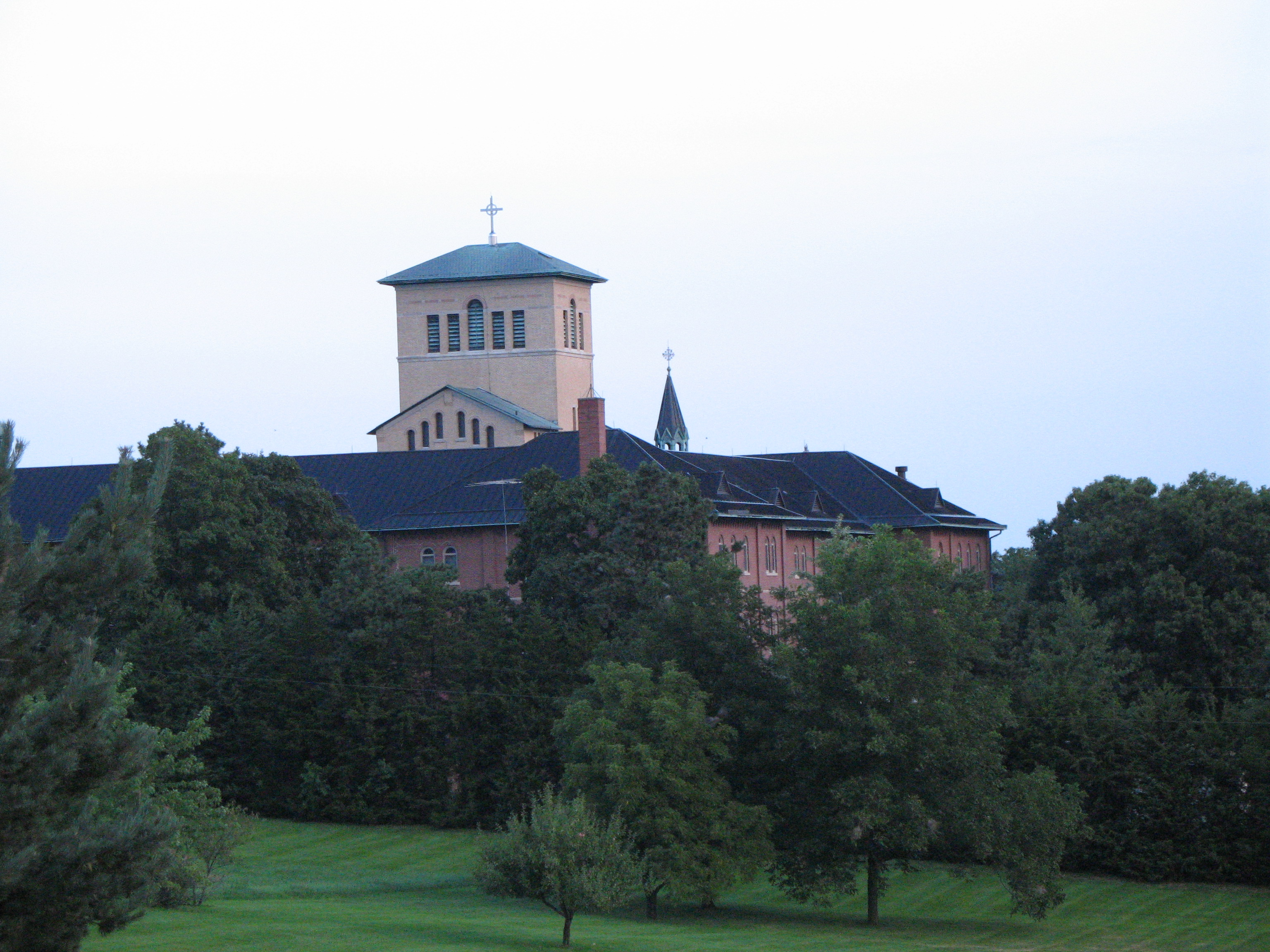
- Benedictine Sisters of Perpetual Adoration monastery in Clyde, Missouri
- Abbreviation: O.S.B
- Formation: c. AD 1874; 152 years ago
- Founder: Mother Mary Anselma Felber
- Type: Catholic religious order
- Headquarters: Clyde United States of America
- Members: 38 (2025)
- Website: benedictinesisters.org

The Benedictine Sisters of Perpetual Adoration are a congregation of sisters that follow the Rule of St. Benedict and practice daily Eucharistic adoration. Their monastery is located in Clyde, Missouri.

== History ==
The original monastery was founded in 1874 by a group of five sisters led by Mary Anselma Felber, who came from the young monastery of Maria-Rickenbach (founded 1857) in Switzerland. Arriving in Clyde, Missouri, they founded the Benedictine Convent of Perpetual Adoration. This remains the motherhouse and largest community of the congregation. The decision to come was sparked by the departure of a group of monks from the nearby Engelberg Abbey, at a time when monastic communities were threatened by political changes taking place throughout Europe. The monks went on to found Conception Abbey in nearby Conception, Missouri, and began to minister to German and Irish immigrants of the region.

Like the monastery in Switzerland, the sisters devoted much skill to the art of ecclesiastical embroidery, and assiduously cultivated the singing of plainchant. The sisters began teaching the immigrant children and before long they opened St. Joseph's Academy, and ran an orphanage.

Since the early 1900s, they established monasteries in Chewelah, Washington; Mundelein, Illinois; Tucson, Arizona; Kansas City, Missouri; St. Louis, Missouri; San Diego, California; and Sand Springs, Oklahoma. Additionally, the San Benito Monastery in Dayton, Wyoming was established in 1989 and closed down in 2014.

== Present day ==
The congregation's monastery is in Clyde, Missouri. The sisters follow a simple, contemplative way of life, formed by the Rule of St. Benedict. As of 2016, there were sixty-one members. They support themselves by producing soap, liturgical vestments and gourmet popcorn. In 2021, they suspended their altar bread operation, with the exception of their signature low-gluten wafers. Their products are sold under the name "Monastery Creations"; the soaps and lotions are produced onsite in a building that was once in 1927 as a slaughterhouse when the monastery had a large dairy and livestock operation. "Monastery Scents" offers several different kinds of soap, lotions, salves, lip balm and candles sold in the monastery's gift shop and online.

=== Low gluten hosts developed by the group ===
The sisters produce low-gluten hosts safe for celiacs, which has been approved by the Catholic Church for use at Mass. The hosts are made and packaged in a dedicated wheat-free / gluten-free environment. Gluten content analysis found no detectable amount of gluten, though the reported gluten content is 0.01% as that was the lowest limit of detection possible with the utilized analysis technique. In an article from the Catholic Review (15 February 2004) gastroenterologist Alessio Fasano was quoted as declaring these hosts "perfectly safe for celiac sufferers."

== See also ==
- Benedictine Sisters of the Reparation of the Holy Face

== Sources ==
- Innes, Stephanie. "Midtown nuns to thank Knights with special Mass", azstarnet, August 6, 2007
- Spirit&Life(ISSN 0038-7592), published bimonthly by the Benedictine Sisters of Perpetual Adoration, 800 N. Country Club Rd., Tucson, AZ 85716
