= Dawsonville, Missouri =

Extinct hamlet in Missouri, U.S.

Coordinates: 40°27′52″N 95°05′58″W

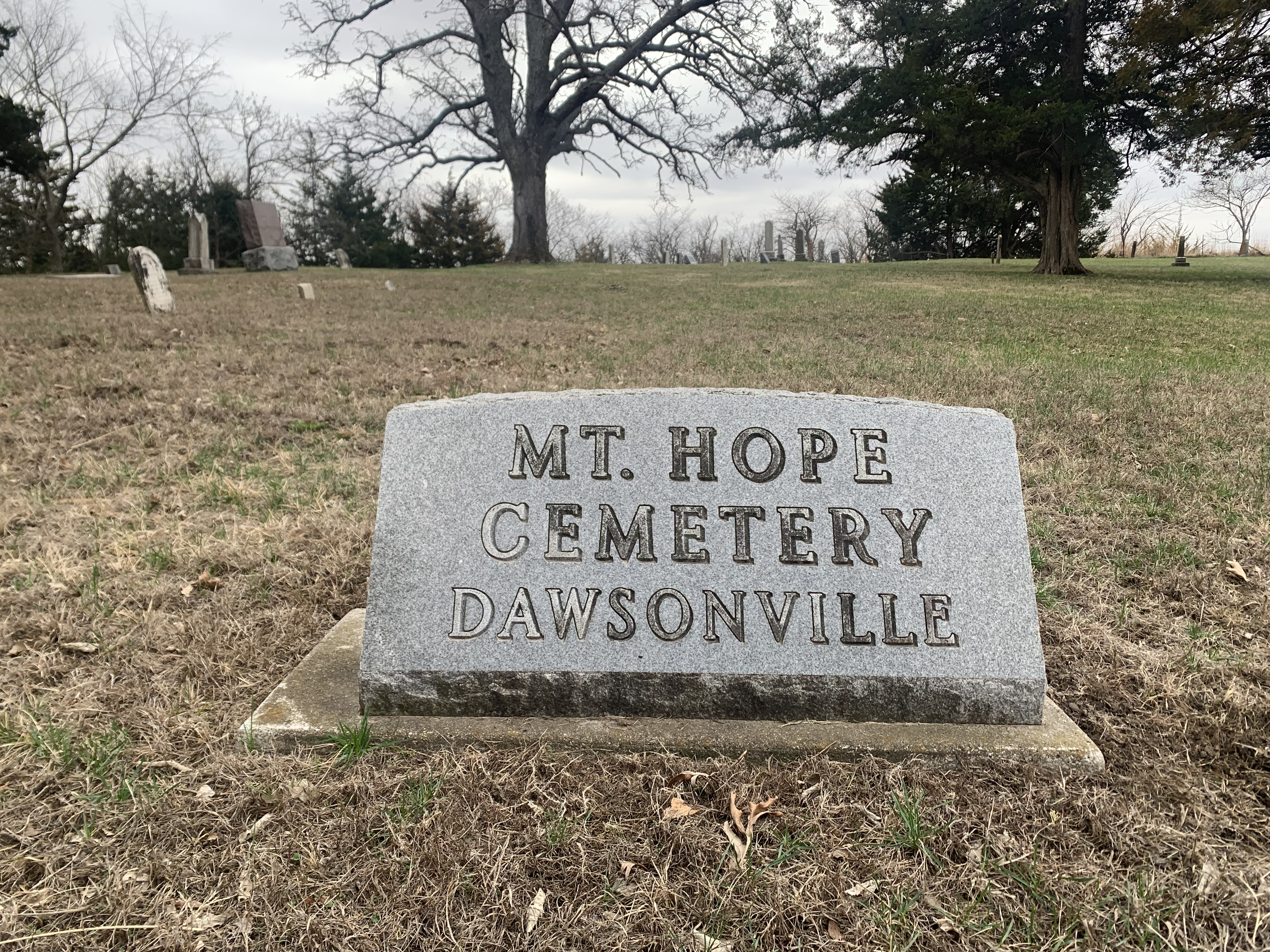
Mount Hope Cemetery at Dawsonville, Missouri

Dawsonville is an extinct community in northwestern Nodaway County, in the U.S. state of Missouri.

== History ==
Dawsonville was platted in 1879, and named after Lafe Dawson, an early settler. Variant names were "City Bluff", "Dawson", and "Halsas Ferry". The first post office was called City Bluff from 1871-1879, and then the name changed to Dawson in 1880, and remained in operation until 1904. The Wabash Railroad passed through here.
