= Clyde, Missouri =

- Village
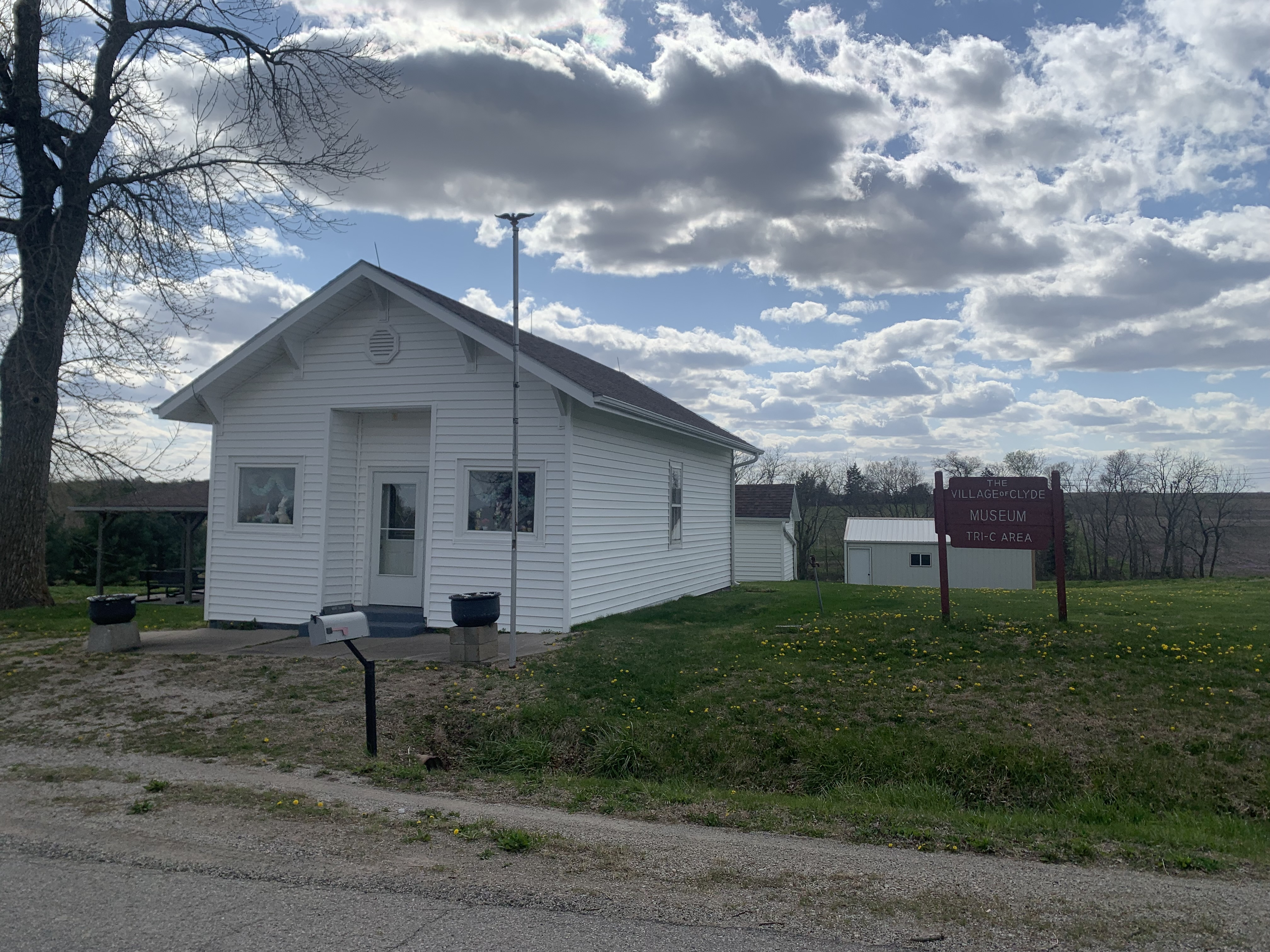
- The Village of Clyde Museum of the Tri-C Area

- Location of Clyde, Missouri
- Coordinates: 40°15′58″N 94°40′11″W
- Country: United States
- State: Missouri
- County: Nodaway
- Township: Jefferson
- Incorporated: 1882

Area
  - Total: 0.17 sq mi (0.44 km^{2})
  - Land: 0.17 sq mi (0.44 km^{2})
  - Water: 0 sq mi (0.00 km^{2})
- Elevation: 997 ft (304 m)

Population (2020)
  - Total: 55
  - Density: 326.5/sq mi (126.07/km^{2})
- Time zone: UTC-6 (Central (CST))
  - Summer (DST): UTC-5 (CDT)
- ZIP code: 64432
- Area code: 660
- FIPS code: 29-15130
- GNIS feature ID: 2398585

Clyde is a village in southeastern Nodaway County, Missouri, United States. The population was 55 at the 2020 census.

It is home to the Benedictine Convent of Perpetual Adoration which houses 550 documented saint relics—one of the largest collections in the United States.

== History ==
A post office called Clyde has been in operation since 1880. The community was named from some Clydesdale horses an early citizen had purchased. An early variant name was "New Conception".

== Geography ==
Clyde, the smallest community in the Tri-C Area, is located one mile east of Conception Junction and two miles northeast of Conception. Clyde is approximately 5.5 miles south of Ravenwood.

According to the United States Census Bureau, the village has a total area of 0.15 square miles (0.39 km^{2}), all land.

== Demographics ==
Historical population
Census	Pop.	Note	%±
1900	250		—
1910	368		47.2%
1920	213		−42.1%
1930	184		−13.6%
1940	148		−19.6%
1950	115		−22.3%
1960	90		−21.7%
1970	158		75.6%
1980	61		−61.4%
1990	71		16.4%
2000	74		4.2%
2010	82		10.8%
2020	55		−32.9%
U.S. Decennial Census

=== 2010 census ===
As of the census of 2010, there were 82 people, 27 households, and 22 families living in the village. The population density was 546.7 inhabitants per square mile (211.1/km^{2}). There were 30 housing units at an average density of 200.0 per square mile (77.2/km^{2}). The racial makeup of the village was 100.0% White.

There were 27 households, of which 44.4% had children under the age of 18 living with them, 59.3% were married couples living together, 14.8% had a female householder with no husband present, 7.4% had a male householder with no wife present, and 18.5% were non-families. 14.8% of all households were made up of individuals. The average household size was 3.04 and the average family size was 3.27.

The median age in the village was 35 years. 34.1% of residents were under the age of 18; 5% were between the ages of 18 and 24; 26.9% were from 25 to 44; 24.4% were from 45 to 64; and 9.8% were 65 years of age or older. The gender makeup of the village was 56.1% male and 43.9% female.

=== 2000 census ===
As of the census of 2000, there were 74 people, 25 households, and 22 families living in the village. The population density was 430.4 inhabitants per square mile (166.2/km^{2}). There were 27 housing units at an average density of 157.0 per square mile (60.6/km^{2}). The racial makeup of the village was 98.65% White, and 1.35% from two or more races.

There were 25 households, out of which 44.0% had children under the age of 18 living with them, 80.0% were married couples living together, 8.0% had a female householder with no husband present, and 12.0% were non-families. 12.0% of all households were made up of individuals, and 4.0% had someone living alone who was 65 years of age or older. The average household size was 2.96 and the average family size was 3.18.

In the village, the population was spread out, with 32.4% under the age of 18, 13.5% from 18 to 24, 27.0% from 25 to 44, 23.0% from 45 to 64, and 4.1% who were 65 years of age or older. The median age was 28 years. For every 100 females, there were 76.2 males. For every 100 females age 18 and over, there were 78.6 males.

The median income for a household in the village was $36,250, and the median income for a family was $36,250. Males had a median income of $26,458 versus $28,750 for females. The per capita income for the village was $15,684. There were 12.5% of families and 13.9% of the population living below the poverty line, including 22.2% of under eighteens and none of those over 64.
