= Conception, Missouri =

Unincorporated community in Missouri, U.S.

Conception
- Census-designated place
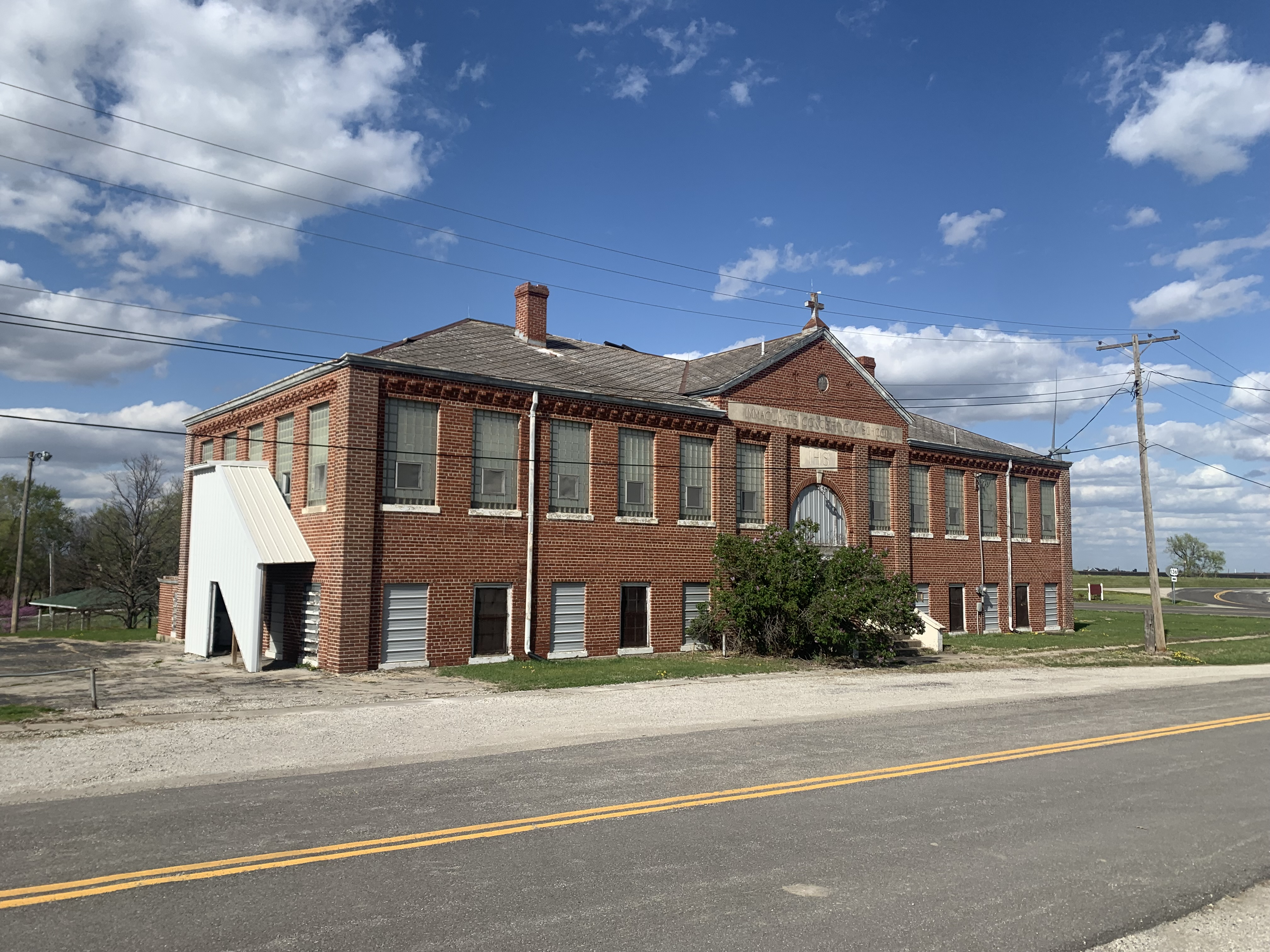
- Immaculate Conception High School, April 2025

- Location within the state of Missouri
- Coordinates: 40°14′28″N 94°40′50″W
- Country: United States
- State: Missouri
- County: Nodaway
- Township: Jefferson

Area
  - Total: 0.76 sq mi (1.97 km^{2})
  - Land: 0.75 sq mi (1.94 km^{2})
  - Water: 0.012 sq mi (0.03 km^{2})
- Elevation: 1,063 ft (324 m)

Population (2020)
  - Total: 111
  - Density: 148.1/sq mi (57.17/km^{2})
- Time zone: UTC-6 (Central (CST))
  - Summer (DST): UTC-5 (CDT)
- ZIP code: 64433
- Area code: 660
- FIPS code: 29-15886
- GNIS feature ID: 2587060

Conception is a census-designated place (CDP) in southeastern Nodaway County, Missouri, United States. The population was 111 at the 2020 Census. Conception is home to Conception Abbey, a Benedictine monastery and seminary. Conception has frequently been noted on lists of unusual place names.

== History ==
Conception was built up chiefly by Irish Catholics. The community was named for the Catholic dogma of Immaculate Conception. A post office called Conception has been in operation since 1864 and its abbey was founded in 1873

== Demographics ==
Historical population
Census	Pop.	Note	%±
2020	111		—
U.S. Decennial Census

=== 2020 census ===
As of the census of 2020, there were 111 people in the census-designated place. The population density was 148.1 inhabitants per square mile (57.2/km^{2}). The racial makeup of the city was 96.4% White, 2.7% Asian, and 0.9% Two or more races. The gender makeup of the city was 68.5% male and 31.5% female, which is a significant outlier and is due to the male-only Catholic seminary.

There were 27 households, of which _% had children under the age of 18 living with them, 66.7% were married couples living together and 33.3% had a male householder with no wife present. The average household size was 4.11.

The median age in the city was 58.4 years. 12.6% of residents were under the age of 18; 4.5% were between the ages of 18 and 24; 17.1% were from 25 to 44; 27% were from 45 to 64; and 38.7% were 65 years of age or older.

== Geography ==
Conception is approximately 11 mi (18 km) southeast of Maryville on US 136 and about 6 miles northeast of Guilford. It is part of the Tri-C Area being 1.5 mi (2.4 km) miles south of Conception Junction and 2 mi (3.2 km) southwest of Clyde. The Platte River passes 1.5 mi (2.4 km) to the west.

=== Climate ===
Climate data for Conception, Missouri (1991–2020)
Month	Jan	Feb	Mar	Apr	May	Jun	Jul	Aug	Sep	Oct	Nov	Dec	Year
Mean daily maximum °F (°C)	33.5 (0.8)	38.9 (3.8)	51.3 (10.7)	62.6 (17.0)	72.3 (22.4)	82.0 (27.8)	85.9 (29.9)	84.7 (29.3)	77.5 (25.3)	65.2 (18.4)	50.5 (10.3)	38.1 (3.4)	61.9 (16.6)
Daily mean °F (°C)	24.4 (−4.2)	29.1 (−1.6)	40.6 (4.8)	51.6 (10.9)	62.2 (16.8)	72.0 (22.2)	76.0 (24.4)	74.3 (23.5)	66.3 (19.1)	54.0 (12.2)	40.6 (4.8)	29.4 (−1.4)	51.7 (11.0)
Mean daily minimum °F (°C)	15.4 (−9.2)	19.3 (−7.1)	29.9 (−1.2)	40.6 (4.8)	52.2 (11.2)	62.0 (16.7)	66.1 (18.9)	63.8 (17.7)	55.1 (12.8)	42.9 (6.1)	30.7 (−0.7)	20.7 (−6.3)	41.6 (5.3)
Average precipitation inches (mm)	0.89 (23)	1.41 (36)	2.42 (61)	3.97 (101)	5.15 (131)	5.09 (129)	5.51 (140)	4.05 (103)	3.74 (95)	2.87 (73)	1.95 (50)	1.49 (38)	38.54 (980)
Average snowfall inches (cm)	5.8 (15)	5.1 (13)	2.1 (5.3)	1.1 (2.8)	0.0 (0.0)	0.0 (0.0)	0.0 (0.0)	0.0 (0.0)	0.0 (0.0)	0.1 (0.25)	1.4 (3.6)	3.8 (9.7)	19.4 (49.65)
Source: NOAA

== Education ==
Conception is in the Jefferson C-123 School District which has an elementary school and a high school located between Conception and Conception Junction in the center of Jefferson Township. Additionally, a private catholic seminary is located in Conception at the Conception Abbey.

== Infrastructure ==
The Conception Wind Project is a small wind farm location around and south of Conception.

== See also ==
- List of census-designated places in Missouri
