= Bell Grove, Missouri =

Extinct hamlet in Missouri, U.S.

Coordinates: 40°18′13″N 94°54′49″W

Bell Grove is an extinct community in central Nodaway County, in the U.S. state of Missouri. It was located in southwestern Polk Township, southwest of Maryville.

The community has the name of William Bell, a pioneer citizen.
