= Jefferson Township, Nodaway County, Missouri =

Township in Nodaway County, Missouri, U.S.

Jefferson Township
- Township
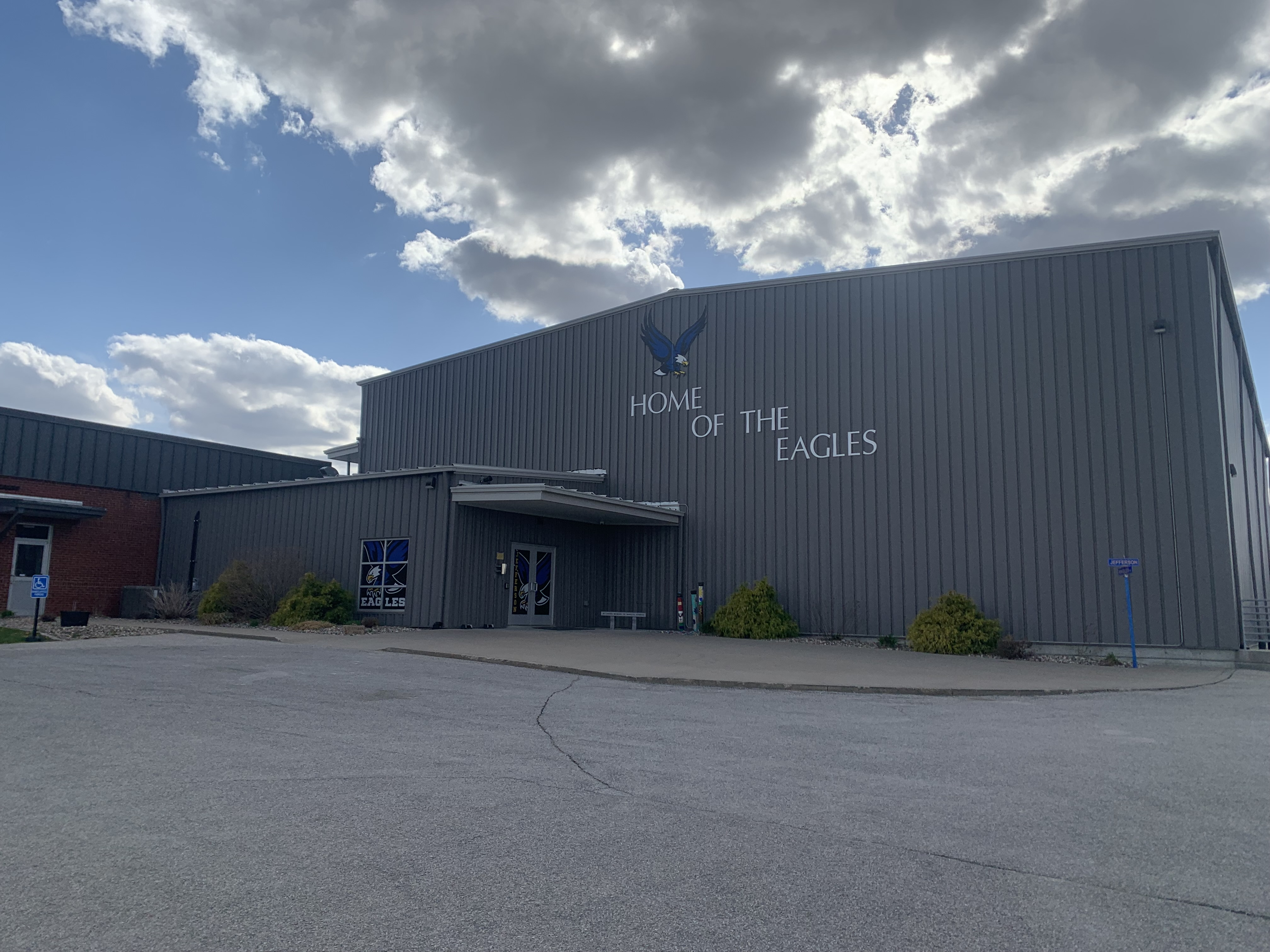
- Jefferson High School

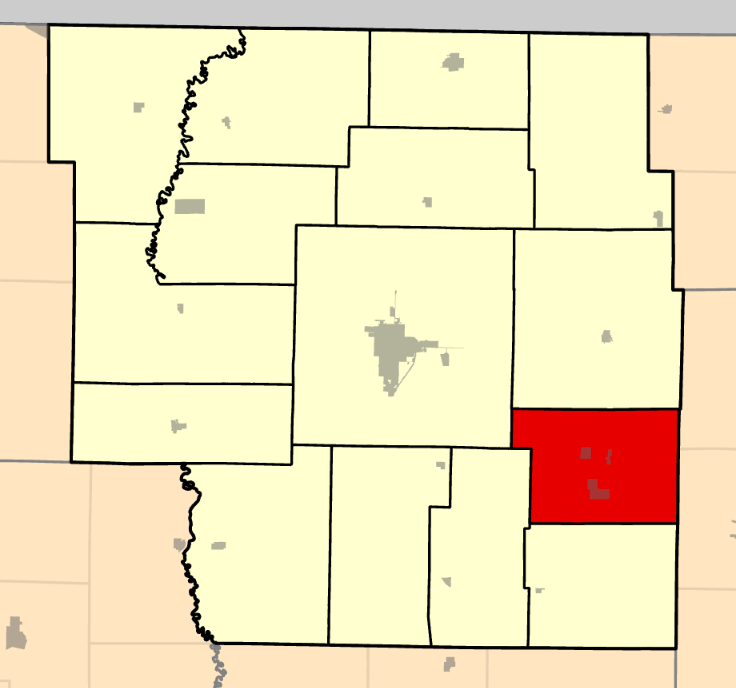
- Coordinates: 40°15′46″N 94°40′40″W
- Country: United States
- State: Missouri
- County: Nodaway
- Erected: 1871

Area
  - Total: 44.36 sq mi (114.9 km^{2})
  - Land: 44.34 sq mi (114.8 km^{2})
  - Water: 0.02 sq mi (0.052 km^{2}) 0.05%
- Elevation: 997 ft (304 m)

Population (2020)
  - Total: 663
  - Density: 15/sq mi (5.8/km^{2})
- FIPS code: 29-14736908
- GNIS feature ID: 767091

Jefferson Township is a township in Nodaway County, Missouri, United States. At the 2020 census, its population was 663. It contains about 48 sections. The township has three communities: Clyde, Conception, and Conception Junction which comprise the Tri-C Area.

== History ==
Jefferson Township was established on March 29, 1871, from the southern part of Jackson Township and the northern part of Washington Township. It was named after President Thomas Jefferson.

== Transportation ==
The following highways travel through the township:

- U.S. Route 136
- Route AA
- Route AF
- Route AH
- Route J
- Route P
- Route T
- Route VV
