= Xenia, Missouri =

Extinct community in Missouri, U.S.

Coordinates: 40°28′26″N 94°46′52″W

Xenia is an extinct community in Nodaway County, Missouri, in the United States. Xenia was located northeast of Maryville, east of the One Hundred and Two River, but the exact location of Xenia is unknown to the GNIS.

The name is a transfer from Xenia, Ohio. Little remained of the original community by the early 20th century, and nothing remains today.

A post office called Xenia was established in 1857, and remained in operation until 1872. With the establishment of Hopkins the post office at Xenia was abolished.
