= Oberdorf, Nidwalden =

Oberdorf
- Municipality
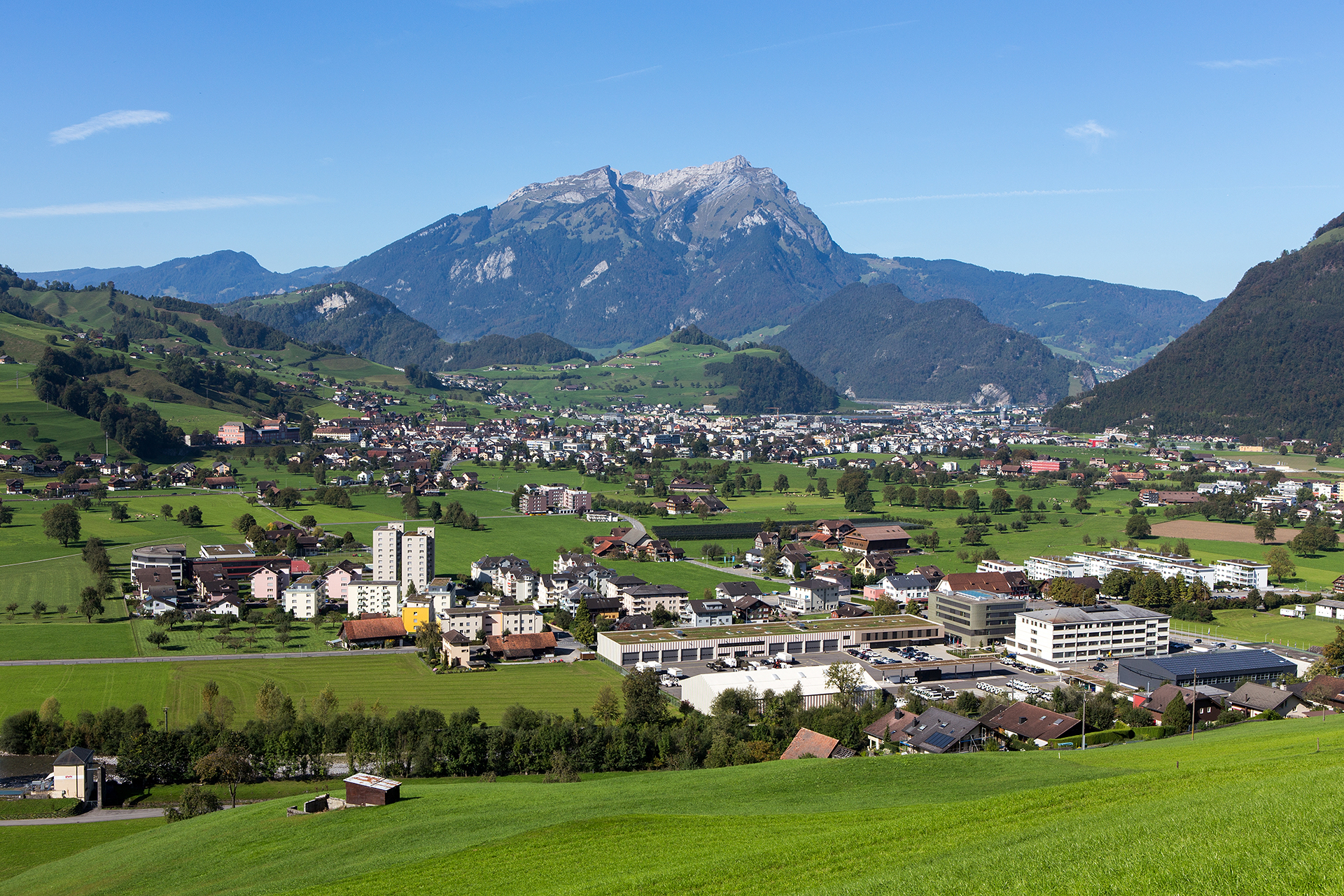

- Flag Coat of arms
- Location of Oberdorf
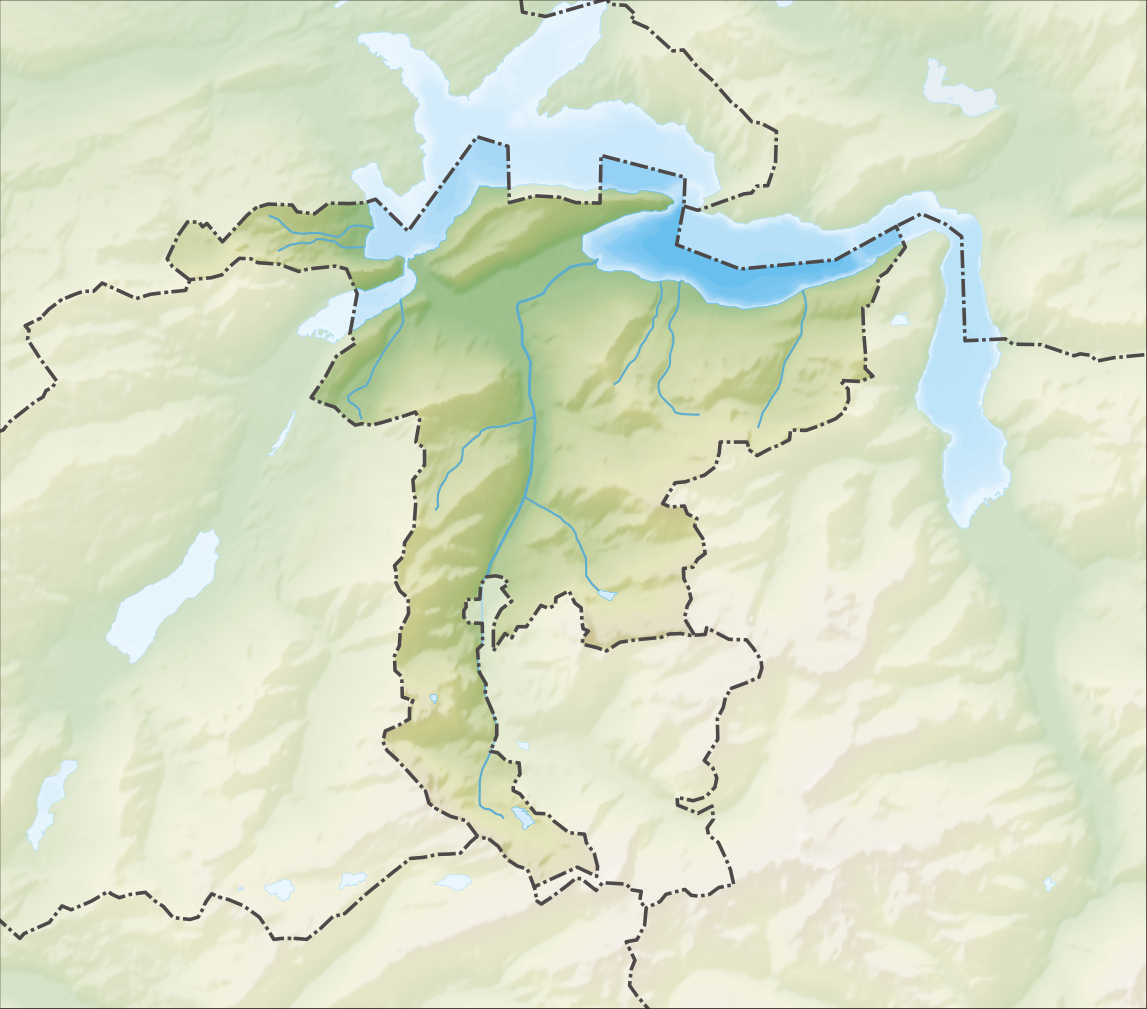
- Location within Switzerland Location within Canton of Nidwalden
- Coordinates: 46°57′N 8°23′E
- Country: Switzerland
- Canton: Nidwalden
- District: n.a.

Area
  - Total: 16.20 km^{2} (6.25 sq mi)
- Elevation: 455 m (1,493 ft)

Population (December 2020)
  - Total: 3,080
  - Density: 190/km^{2} (492/sq mi)
- Time zone: UTC+01:00 (CET)
  - Summer (DST): UTC+02:00 (CEST)
- Postal code: 6370
- SFOS number: 1508
- ISO 3166 code: CH-NW
- Surrounded by: Beckenried, Buochs, Dallenwil, Stans, Wolfenschiessen
- Website: www.oberdorf-nw.ch

Oberdorf is a municipality in the canton of Nidwalden in Switzerland. It consists of the villages and hamlets of Wil, Ennerberg, Waltersberg, Büren nid dem Bach and Niederrickenbach.

The Benedictine convent of Maria-Rickenbach is located within the municipality, next to the hamlet of Niederrickenbach. The convent lies at an altitude of 1,150 m (3,770 ft) and is accessible by cable car.

== History ==
Oberdorf is first mentioned in 1199 as Obirndorf. In 1275 it was mentioned as Oberndorf.

== Geography ==
Aerial view (1956)

Oberdorf has an area, as of 2006, of 16.2 square kilometers (6.3 sq mi). Of this area, 53% is used for agricultural purposes, while 38.3% is forested. Of the rest of the land, 6.7% is settled (buildings or roads) and the remainder (1.9%) is non-productive (rivers, glaciers or mountains).

The municipality is located near and above the municipality of Stans. It consists of the villages and hamlets which are located above Stans (the so-called Upper village or in German Obere Dorf), which include Wil, Ennerberg and Waltersberg. Additionally the hamlets of Büren (nid dem Bach) and Niederrickenbach are included in the municipality.

== Demographics ==
Oberdorf has a population (as of 31 December 2020) of 3,080. As of 2007, 5.6% of the population was made up of foreign nationals. Over the last 10 years the population has grown at a rate of 7.6%. Most of the population (as of 2000) speaks German (95.2%), with Albanian being second most common ( 0.8%) and English being third ( 0.7%). As of 2008 the gender distribution of the population was 50.3% male and 49.7% female.

As of 2000 there are 1,054 households, of which 587 households (or about 55.7%) contain only one or two individuals. 151 or about 14.3% are large households, with at least five members.

In the 2007 federal election the most popular party was the FDP which received 90.8% of the vote. Most of the rest of the votes went to small right-wing parties (8.6%).

In Oberdorf about 70.6% of the population (between age 25–64) have completed either non-mandatory upper secondary education or additional higher education (either university or a Fachhochschule).

Oberdorf has an unemployment rate of 1.09%. As of 2005, there were 214 people employed in the primary economic sector and about 77 businesses involved in this sector. 530 people are employed in the secondary sector and there are 35 businesses in this sector. 252 people are employed in the tertiary sector, with 40 businesses in this sector.

The historical population is given in the following table:

year	population
1850	971
1900	1,117
1950	1,455
1960	1,501
1970	1,783
1980	2,272
1990	2,663
2000	2,992
2005	2,961
2008	3,123

== Sights ==
The main sight of Oberdorf is the pilgrimage chapel Niederrickenbach.
