= Orrsburg, Missouri =

Extinct community in Missouri, U.S.

Coordinates: 40°25′51″N 94°43′17″W

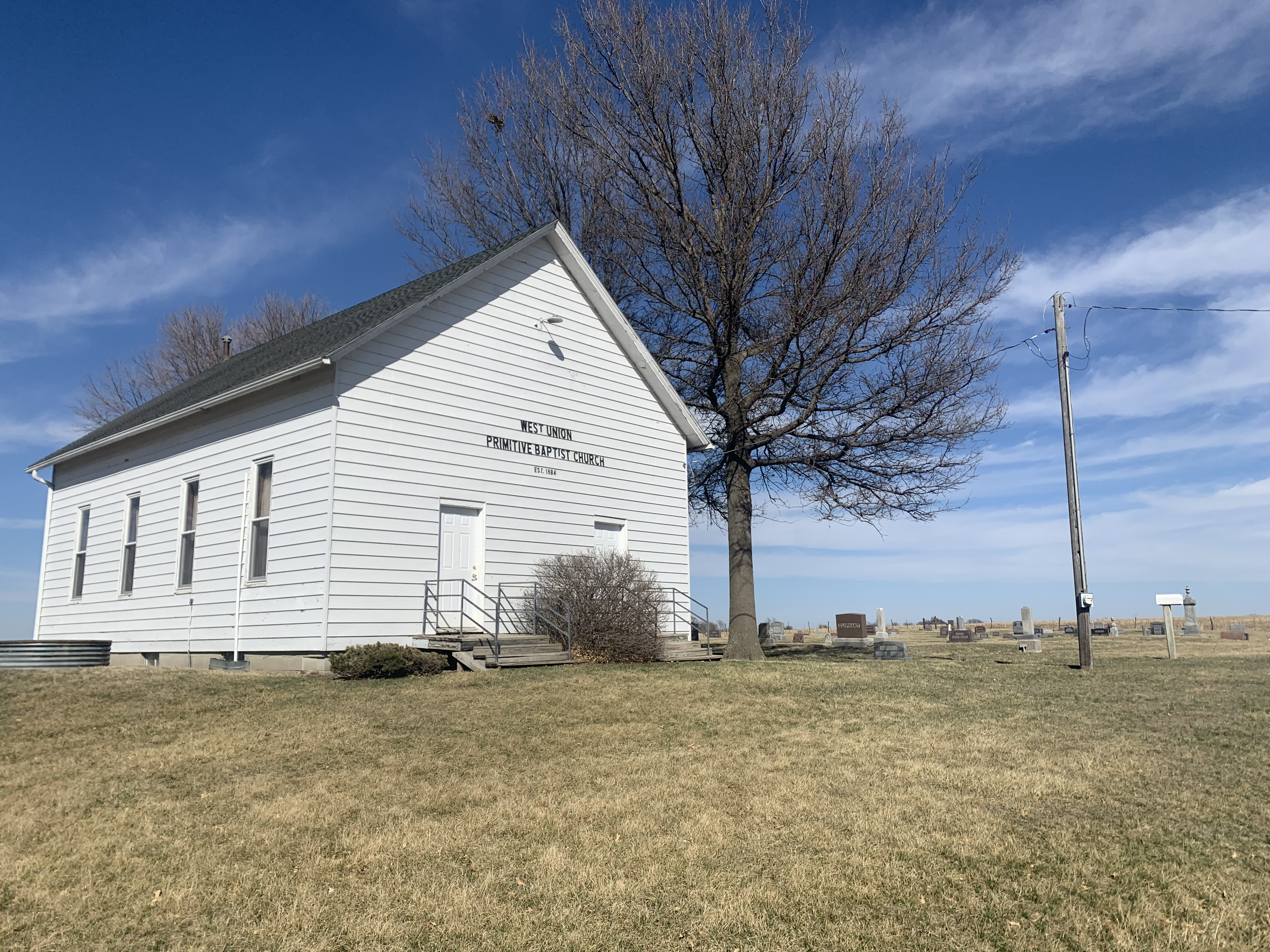
West Union Church and Cemetery at Orrsburg, Missouri

Orrsburg is an extinct community in northeastern Nodaway County, in the U.S. state of Missouri.

== History ==
Orrsburg was laid out in 1881 and named after an early settler. A post office called Orrsburg was established in 1881, and remained in operation until 1902. A store persisted in the community until at least 1965. A variant spelling of "Orrsburgh" was prevalent.
