= Jefferson High School (Missouri) =

Public school in Missouri, United States

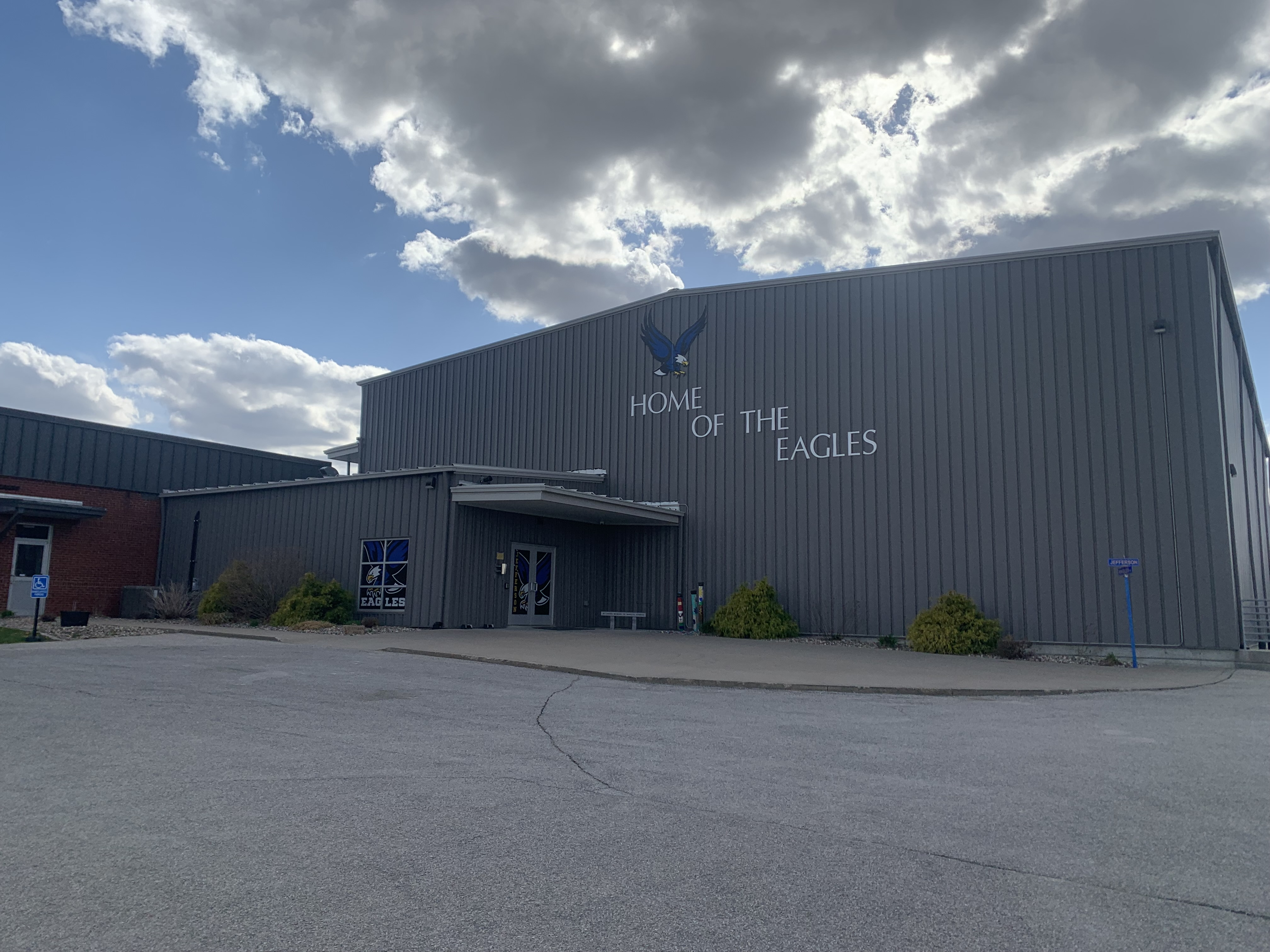

Location
- 37614 US Hwy 136; Conception Junction, Missouri 64434; United States; 40.2583°N 94.6879°W

Information
- Type: Public
- Principal: Tyler Pedersen
- Staff: 8.97 (FTE)
- Grades: 7–12
- Enrollment: 58 (2023-2024)
- Student to teacher ratio: 6.47
- Color
- Athletics conference: Highway 275
- Mascot: Eagle
- Website: www.jeffersonc123.org/vnews/display.v/SEC/Junior%20High/High%20School

Jefferson High School is the public high school in Conception Junction, Missouri.

== See also ==
- Education in Missouri
- List of colleges and universities in Missouri
- List of high schools in Missouri
- Missouri Department of Elementary and Secondary Education
