= Conception Junction, Missouri =

City in Nodaway County, Missouri, United States

- City
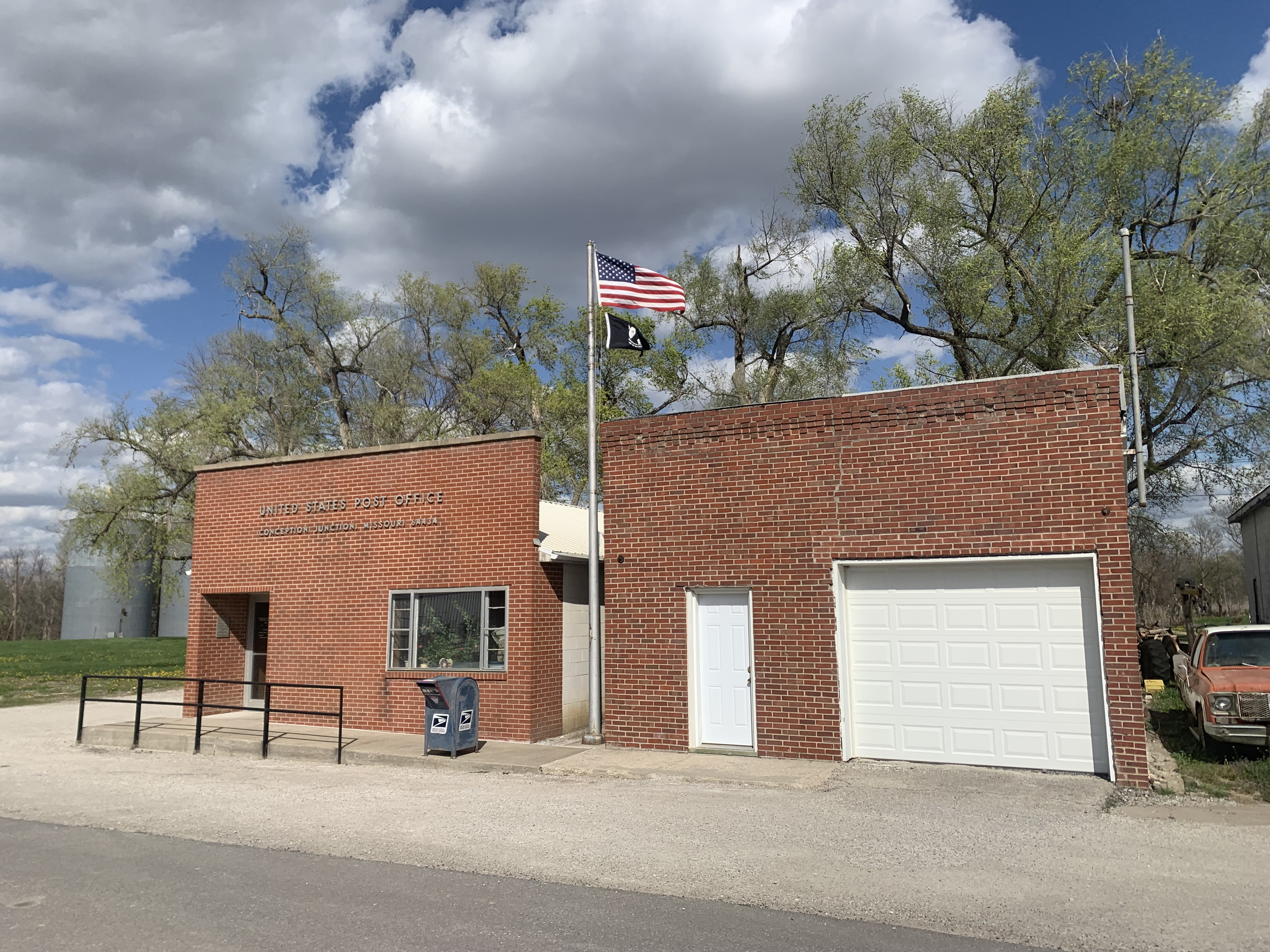
- Conception Junction post office

- Location of Conception Junction, Missouri
- Coordinates: 40°16′06″N 94°41′29″W
- Country: United States
- State: Missouri
- County: Nodaway
- Township: Jefferson
- Platted: 1895

Area
  - Total: 0.32 sq mi (0.82 km^{2})
  - Land: 0.32 sq mi (0.82 km^{2})
  - Water: 0 sq mi (0.00 km^{2})
- Elevation: 1,014 ft (309 m)

Population (2020)
  - Total: 177
  - Density: 559.6/sq mi (216.08/km^{2})
- Time zone: UTC-6 (Central (CST))
  - Summer (DST): UTC-5 (CDT)
- ZIP code: 64434
- Area code: 660
- FIPS code: 29-15922
- GNIS feature ID: 2396659

Conception Junction is a city in southeastern Nodaway County, Missouri, United States. The population was 177 at the 2020 census.

== History ==
New Conception was laid out in 1895 when the railroad was extended to the site. A post office called Conception Junction has been in operation since 1907. Another name for this settlement was Monastery.

Conception Junction was named for a railroad junction between the Wabash and the Chicago Great Western Railroads. Both lines are now gone.

== Geography ==
Conception Junction is the largest community of the Tri-C Area, being 1.5 miles north of Conception, home of Conception Abbey, and one mile west of the village of Clyde. The Platte River lies just west of the city.

According to the United States Census Bureau, the city has a total area of 0.31 square miles (0.80 km^{2}), all land.

== Demographics ==
Historical population
Census	Pop.	Note	%±
1910	132		—
1920	518		292.4%
1930	514		−0.8%
1940	441		−14.2%
1950	285		−35.4%
1960	253		−11.2%
1970	237		−6.3%
1980	252		6.3%
1990	236		−6.3%
2000	202		−14.4%
2010	198		−2.0%
2020	177		−10.6%
U.S. Decennial Census

=== 2010 census ===
As of the census of 2010, there were 198 people, 78 households, and 48 families living in the city. The population density was 638.7 inhabitants per square mile (246.6/km^{2}). There were 97 housing units at an average density of 312.9 per square mile (120.8/km^{2}). The racial makeup of the city was 100.0% White.

There were 78 households, of which 38.5% had children under the age of 18 living with them, 51.3% were married couples living together, 6.4% had a female householder with no husband present, 3.8% had a male householder with no wife present, and 38.5% were non-families. 33.3% of all households were made up of individuals, and 12.8% had someone living alone who was 65 years of age or older. The average household size was 2.54 and the average family size was 3.33.

The median age in the city was 34.3 years. 33.3% of residents were under the age of 18; 4.6% were between the ages of 18 and 24; 27.4% were from 25 to 44; 23.8% were from 45 to 64; and 11.1% were 65 years of age or older. The gender makeup of the city was 52.5% male and 47.5% female.

=== 2000 census ===
As of the census of 2000, there were 202 people, 83 households, and 55 families living in the town. The population density was 644.4 inhabitants per square mile (248.8/km^{2}). There were 94 housing units at an average density of 299.9 per square mile (115.8/km^{2}). The racial makeup of the town was 97.03% White, and 2.97% from two or more races.

There were 83 households, out of which 33.7% had children under the age of 18 living with them, 49.4% were married couples living together, 9.6% had a female householder with no husband present, and 33.7% were non-families. 32.5% of all households were made up of individuals, and 22.9% had someone living alone who was 65 years of age or older. The average household size was 2.42 and the average family size was 3.05.

In the town the population was spread out, with 27.7% under the age of 18, 8.4% from 18 to 24, 24.3% from 25 to 44, 21.3% from 45 to 64, and 18.3% who were 65 years of age or older. The median age was 38 years. For every 100 females there were 104.0 males. For every 100 females age 18 and over, there were 105.6 males.

The median income for a household in the town was $29,219, and the median income for a family was $32,083. Males had a median income of $26,250 versus $21,875 for females. The per capita income for the town was $12,563. About 8.8% of families and 15.3% of the population were below the poverty line, including 22.2% of those under the age of eighteen and 21.4% of those 65 or over.

== See also ==
- List of cities in Missouri
