= Ravenwood, Missouri =

- City
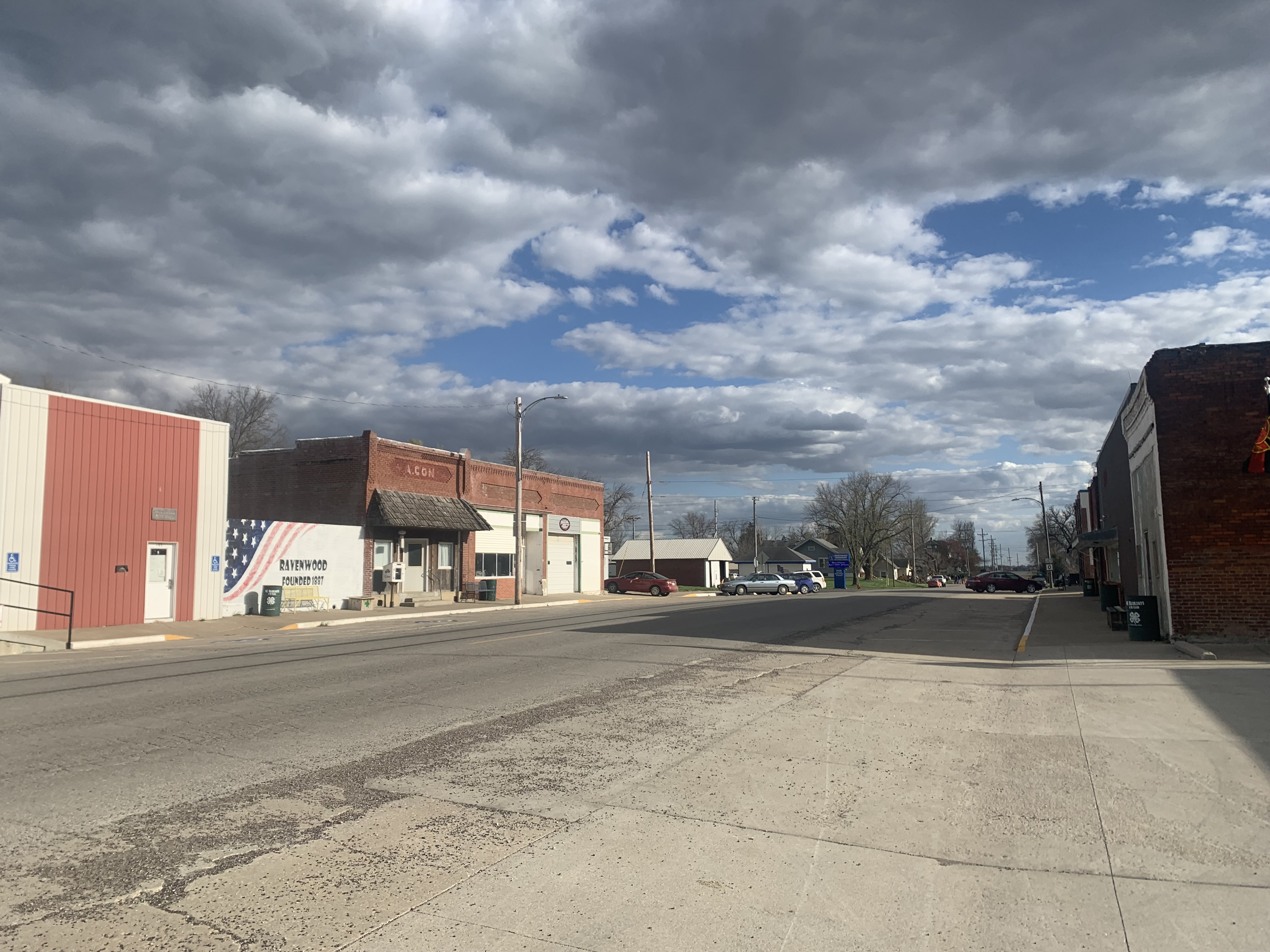
- Main Street view of Ravenwood
- Motto: Village in the Valley
- Location of Ravenwood, Missouri
- Coordinates: 40°21′09″N 94°40′20″W
- Country: United States
- State: Missouri
- County: Nodaway
- Township: Jackson
- Platted: 1887

Area
  - Total: 0.30 sq mi (0.78 km^{2})
  - Land: 0.30 sq mi (0.78 km^{2})
  - Water: 0 sq mi (0.00 km^{2})
- Elevation: 1,034 ft (315 m)

Population (2020)
  - Total: 439
  - Density: 1,455.9/sq mi (562.13/km^{2})
- Time zone: UTC-6 (Central (CST))
  - Summer (DST): UTC-5 (CDT)
- ZIP code: 64479
- Area code: 660
- FIPS code: 29-60716
- GNIS feature ID: 2396869

Ravenwood is a city in eastern Nodaway County, Missouri, United States, near the Platte River. The population was 439 at the 2020 census.

== History ==
Ravenwood was laid out in 1887 when the railroad was extended to that point. The community has the name of the original owner of the land where the village now stands. A post office called Ravenwood has been in operation since 1888.

== Geography ==
Ravenwood is located on Missouri Route 46 just north of the junction with US Route 136. Maryville is approximately ten miles to the west on Route 136 and Parnell is six miles to the northeast on Route 46. The Platte River flows past the west side of the community.

According to the United States Census Bureau, the city has a total area of 0.27 square miles (0.70 km^{2}), all land.

== Demographics ==
Historical population
Census	Pop.	Note	%±
1900	285		—
1910	341		19.6%
1920	344		0.9%
1930	336		−2.3%
1940	336		0.0%
1950	319		−5.1%
1960	282		−11.6%
1970	336		19.1%
1980	436		29.8%
1990	409		−6.2%
2000	448		9.5%
2010	440		−1.8%
2020	439		−0.2%
U.S. Decennial Census

=== 2010 census ===
As of the census of 2010, there were 440 people, 185 households, and 119 families living in the city. The population density was 1,629.6 inhabitants per square mile (629.2/km^{2}). There were 208 housing units at an average density of 770.4 per square mile (297.5/km^{2}). The racial makeup of the city was 99.5% White, 0.2% African American, and 0.2% from two or more races. Hispanic or Latino of any race were 0.2% of the population.

There were 185 households, of which 30.8% had children under the age of 18 living with them, 50.8% were married couples living together, 10.8% had a female householder with no husband present, 2.7% had a male householder with no wife present, and 35.7% were non-families. 30.3% of all households were made up of individuals, and 14% had someone living alone who was 65 years of age or older. The average household size was 2.38 and the average family size was 2.97.

The median age in the city was 36.7 years. 26.1% of residents were under the age of 18; 7.1% were between the ages of 18 and 24; 24.6% were from 25 to 44; 27.8% were from 45 to 64; and 14.5% were 65 years of age or older. The gender makeup of the city was 47.5% male and 52.5% female.

=== 2000 census ===
As of the census of 2000, there were 448 people, 196 households, and 118 families living in the town. The population density was 1,660.1 inhabitants per square mile (641.0/km^{2}). There were 209 housing units at an average density of 774.5 per square mile (299.0/km^{2}). The racial makeup of the town was 98.66% White, 0.22% Native American, 0.22% Asian, and 0.89% from two or more races.

There were 196 households, out of which 29.6% had children under the age of 18 living with them, 50.0% were married couples living together, 6.6% had a female householder with no husband present, and 39.3% were non-families. 33.2% of all households were made up of individuals, and 17.9% had someone living alone who was 65 years of age or older. The average household size was 2.29 and the average family size was 2.93.

In the town the population was spread out, with 23.9% under the age of 18, 12.3% from 18 to 24, 25.4% from 25 to 44, 20.3% from 45 to 64, and 18.1% who were 65 years of age or older. The median age was 36 years. For every 100 females there were 93.1 males. For every 100 females age 18 and over, there were 89.4 males.

The median income for a household in the town was $31,250, and the median income for a family was $39,750. Males had a median income of $27,120 versus $18,750 for females. The per capita income for the town was $16,136. About 5.6% of families and 8.9% of the population were below the poverty line, including 8.0% of those under age 18 and 14.7% of those age 65 or over.
