= National Register of Historic Places listings in Nodaway County, Missouri =

Location of Nodaway County in Missouri

This is a list of the National Register of Historic Places listings in Nodaway County, Missouri.

This is intended to be a complete list of the properties and districts on the National Register of Historic Places in Nodaway County, Missouri, United States. Latitude and longitude coordinates are provided for many National Register properties and districts; these locations may be seen together in a map.

There are 9 properties and districts listed on the National Register in the county. Another property was once listed but has been removed.

This National Park Service list is complete through NPS recent listings posted March 14, 2025.

== Current listings ==
	Name on the Register	Image	Date listed	Location	City or town	Description
1	Administrative Building	Administrative Building	July 26, 2010 (#10000504)	800 University Dr. 40°21′12″N 94°52′58″W	Maryville	
2	Caleb Burns House	Caleb Burns House	November 17, 1980 (#80002385)	422 W. 2nd St. 40°20′49″N 94°52′37″W	Maryville	
3	John and Fannie Fields House	John and Fannie Fields House	June 7, 2019 (#100004018)	227 McKenzie St. 40°10′27″N 94°49′20″W	Barnard	
4	Frank House		September 8, 1983 (#83001032)	307 E. 7th St. 40°21′08″N 94°52′13″W	Maryville	
5	Thomas Gaunt House	Thomas Gaunt House	April 19, 1979 (#79001385)	703 College Ave. 40°21′00″N 94°52′55″W	Maryville	Residence of the President of Northwest Missouri State University
6	Maryville Post Office	Maryville Post Office	September 26, 2022 (#100008204)	509 North Main St. 40°21′00″N 94°52′22″W	Maryville	Now houses the local library
7	Nodaway County Courthouse	Nodaway County Courthouse	October 11, 1979 (#79001386)	3rd and Main Sts. 40°20′55″N 94°52′23″W	Maryville	
8	Possum Walk Hotel	Possum Walk Hotel	March 29, 1983 (#83001033)	North of Burlington Junction; 40°29′46″N 95°05′10″W	Burlington Junction	
9	Simpson's College		January 30, 1978 (#78001670)	515 E. Jackson St. 40°12′01″N 95°02′01″W	Graham	

== Former listing ==
	Name on the Register	Image	Date listed	Date removed	Location	City or town	Description
1	Big Pump	Big Pump	September 18, 1980 (#80002384)	December 19, 1994	903 S. Main St.	Maryville	Delisted due to relocation to King City.

== See also ==
- List of National Historic Landmarks in Missouri
- National Register of Historic Places listings in Missouri
