= Frank House =

Frank House, Franks House, or Franke House may refer to:

== People ==
- Frank House (baseball) (1930–2005), American Major League player
- Frank House (footballer) (1884–1963), Australian rules footballer

== Places ==
=== Netherlands ===
- Anne Frank House, museum dedicated to Anne Frank

=== United States ===
- Alan I W Frank House, Pittsburgh, Pennsylvania, historic Gropius-Breuer masterwork
- Anderson–Frank House, historic home in Tampa, Florida, listed on the NRHP in Florida
- George W. Frank House, historic mansion in Kearney, Nebraska
- John Frank House, in Sapulpa, Oklahoma
- M. Lloyd Frank Estate, in Portland, Oregon
- Frank House (Maryville, Missouri), listed on the NRHP in Missouri
- Charles Frank House and Store, Valley City, OH, listed on the NRHP in Ohio
- Joseph M. Frank House, Little Rock, AR, listed on the NRHP in Arkansas
- Charles Franks House, Lanark, IL, listed on the NRHP in Illinois
- C. F. Franke House, Mason City, IA, listed on the NRHP in Iowa
- Henry Frank House, Middletown, KY, listed on the NRHP in Kentucky
- Henry Franks House, Allegan, MI, listed on the NRHP in Michigan
- Case Study House #25, Long Beach, California

=== UK ===
- Franks House, East London, part of the British Museum, used for the storage and study of their Early Prehistory collections
