= Missouri State Arboretum =

Tree sanctuary in Missouri

Coordinates: 40.353306°N 94.88340°W

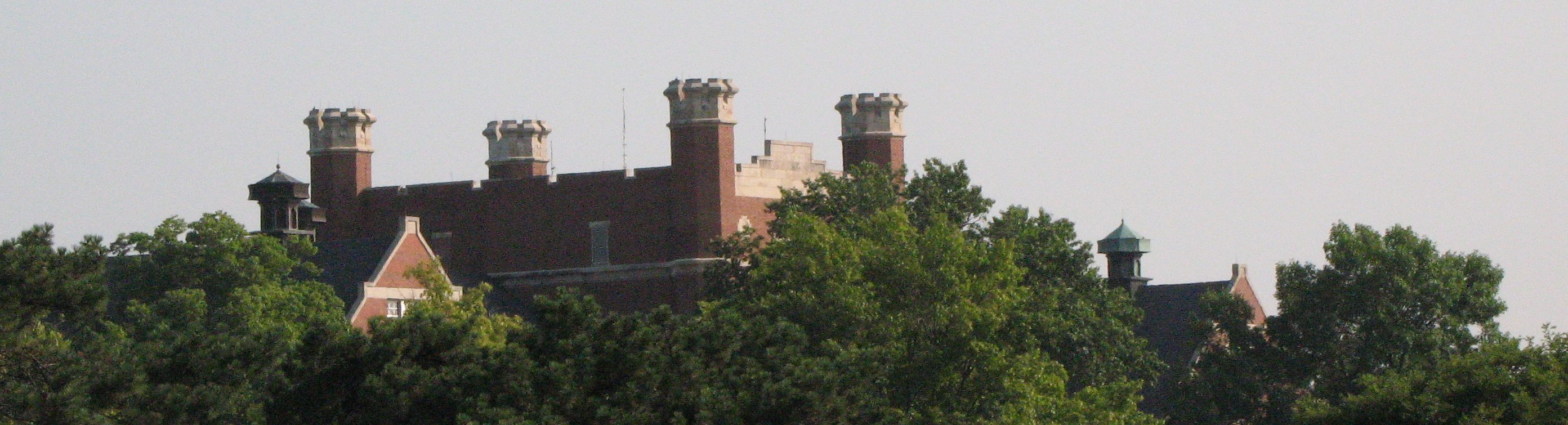
- The Administration Building rises above the Missouri State Arboretum
- Interactive map of Missouri State Arboretum
- Website: Official website

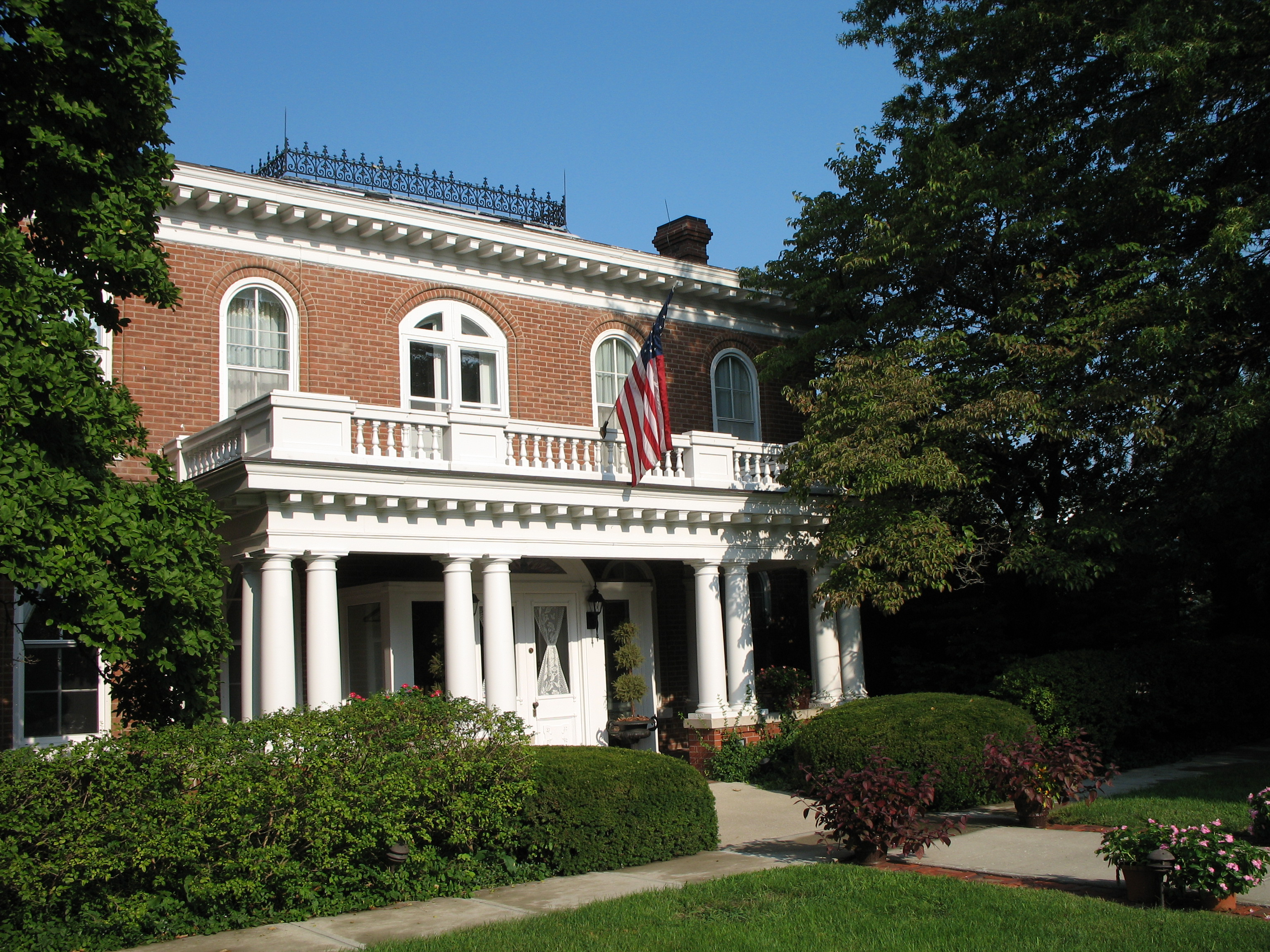
The President's home is on the National Register of Historic Places.

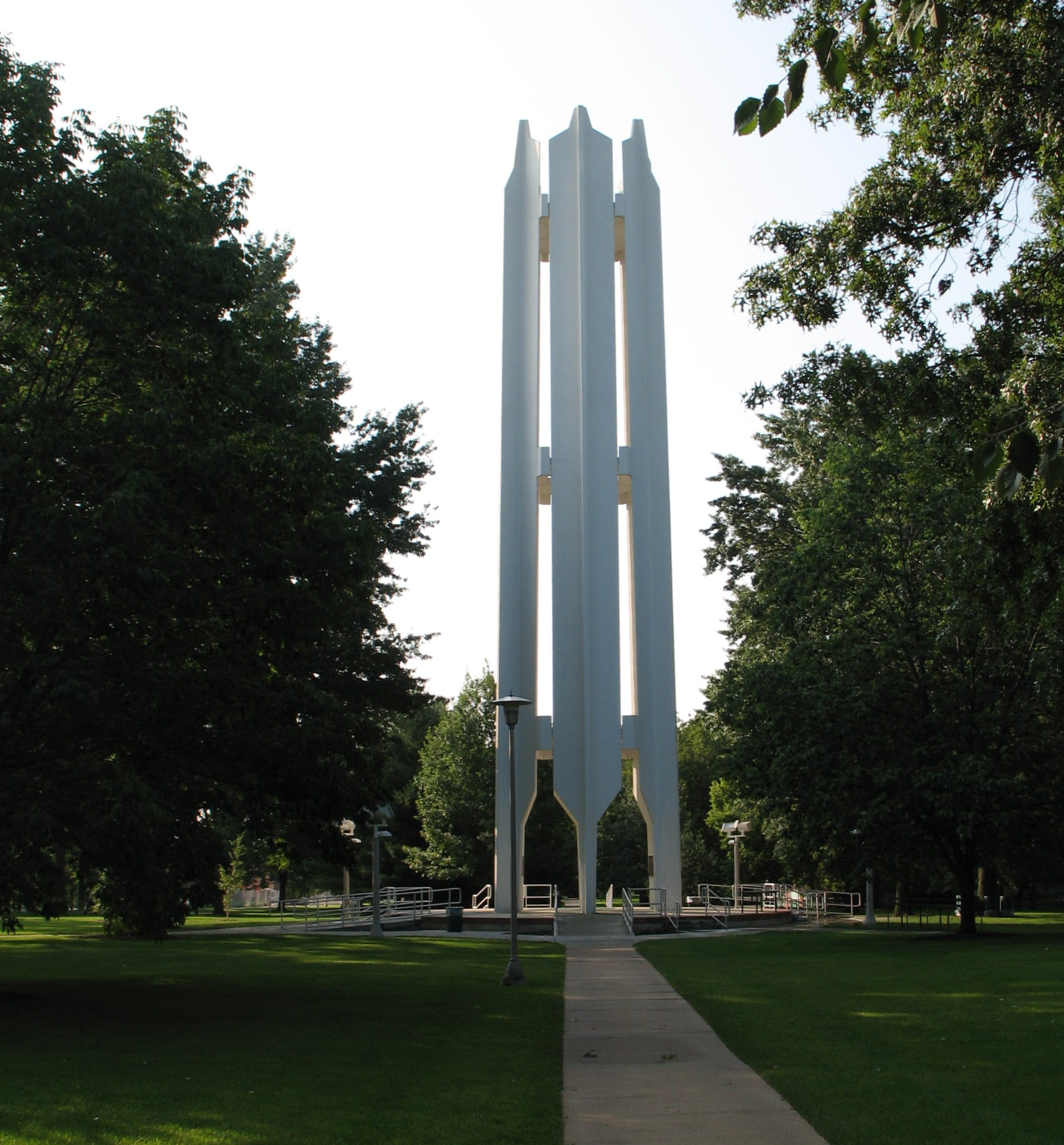
The Tower

The Missouri State Arboretum is on the campus of Northwest Missouri State University in Maryville, Missouri and contains more than 111 species of trees.

Northwest has long billed itself as the "most beautiful state university campus" in the state of Missouri thanks to its landscaped tree-lined campus. The campus design was inspired by the Forest Park design for the 1904 St. Louis World's Fair which evolved into the campus for Washington University.

In 1993, the state legislature designated Northwest the official Missouri State Arboretum.

Thomas Gaunt first started planting trees on the campus when he moved to Maryville in 1857. Gaunt's house has served as the home of all presidents of the university and is on the National Register of Historic Places. It is in a direct line with the university's landmark Administration Building. The route (called the "Long Walk") was lined with hundreds of trees—most famously birches (prompting a phrase that the campus was "behind the birches").

Many of the trees date to grounds keeper J. R. Brink, who was known to have planted 300 trees a year starting in 1915. During this period Brink planted a dense forest on practically all land that did not have buildings. The Brink forest has been whittled away with new buildings and memorials.

In the 1960s most of the campus elms were felled by Dutch elm disease. In the 1970s the bronze birch borer began killing the birches with the last of the original birches dying in 1997. Johanne Wynne Fairchild in 1979 began a process of cataloging the trees and setting up the trails.

Northwest has enhanced the tree experience by designating three trails through the campus trees:

- The Gaunt Trail - It begins at Hudson Hall and passes more than 39 species
- The Tower Trail - It starts at Roberta Hall and passes more than 32 species
- The Chatauqua Trail - The area by the Ron Houston Center for the Performing Arts just west of Bearcat Stadium. It contains 31 species. It derives its name for the original Maryville Park on the location.

According to the Missouri Arboretum Virtual Map there are 792 recorded trees.

== See also ==
- List of botanical gardens and arboretums in Missouri
