= George Vaughn =

George Vaughn may refer to:

- George Vaughn, a songwriting alias of George Vaughn Horton (1911–1988), American songwriter
- George S.E. Vaughn (1823–1899), Confederate spy in the American Civil War
- George Augustus Vaughn Jr. (1897–1989), American fighter ace in World War I
- George L. Vaughn (c. 1880–1949), American jurist
- George W. Vaughn (1809–1877), mayor of Portland, Oregon, 1855–1856
- George Vaughn (Oklahoma politician), member of the Oklahoma House of Representatives

== See also ==
- George Vaughan (disambiguation)
