= George Vaughan =

George Vaughan may refer to:

- George Vaughan (New Hampshire official) (1676–1725), colonial lieutenant governor of New Hampshire
- George Edgar Vaughan (1907–1994), British diplomat

== See also ==
- George Vaughan Hart (British Army officer) (1752–1832), British Army officer and politician
- George Vaughan Hart (lawyer) (1841–1912), Anglo-Irish academic
- George Vaughn (disambiguation)
