= Graham, Missouri =

- City
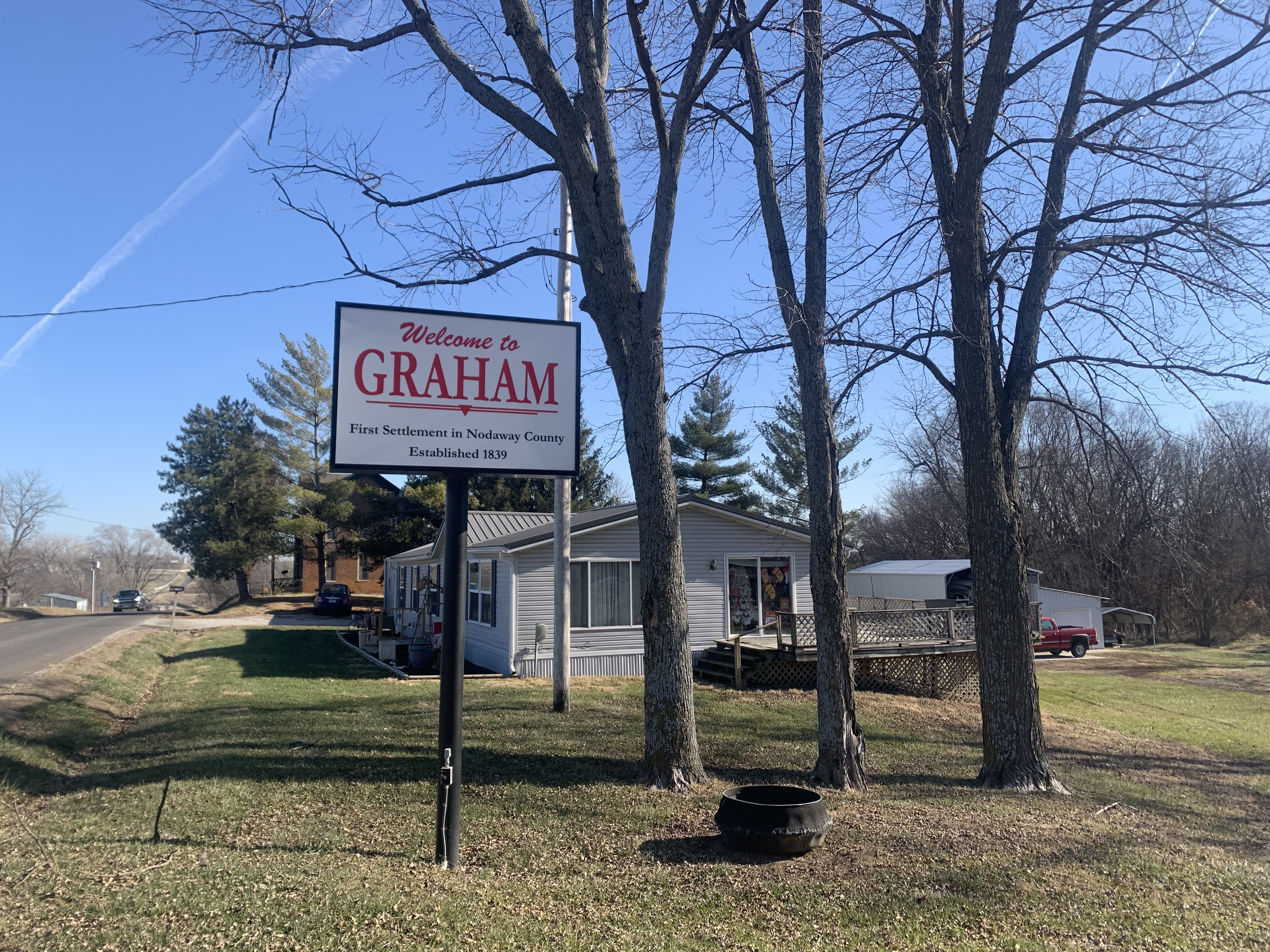
- Town of Graham sign

- Location of Graham, Missouri
- Coordinates: 40°12′05″N 95°02′25″W
- Country: United States
- State: Missouri
- County: Nodaway
- Township: Hughes
- Founded: 1839
- Platted: 1856

Area
  - Total: 0.27 sq mi (0.69 km^{2})
  - Land: 0.27 sq mi (0.69 km^{2})
  - Water: 0 sq mi (0.00 km^{2})
- Elevation: 958 ft (292 m)

Population (2020)
  - Total: 147
  - Density: 552.8/sq mi (213.42/km^{2})
- Time zone: UTC-6 (Central (CST))
  - Summer (DST): UTC-5 (CDT)
- ZIP code: 64455
- Area code: 660
- FIPS code: 29-28072
- GNIS feature ID: 2396968

Graham is a city in southwestern Nodaway County, Missouri, United States. The population was 147 at the 2020 census.

== History ==
Graham, one of the earliest settlements in the Platte Purchase was founded in 1839. It was originally called Jacksonville, but was platted as Graham in 1856. The present name is after Col. Amos Graham, a local clerk. In 1860, under the first postmaster, the post office briefly went by the name of Brownsville until the mid-1860s. A post office called Graham has been in operation since 1852, however was out of service from 2014 to 2020 due to the building being an extremely hazardous location.

Simpson's College was listed on the National Register of Historic Places in 1978.

== Geography ==
Graham is located 13 miles southwest of Maryville, nine miles west of US 71, and two miles east of Maitland in Holt County, which is just across the Nodaway River. According to the United States Census Bureau, the city has a total area of 0.26 square miles (0.67 km^{2}), all land.

== Demographics ==
Historical population
Census	Pop.	Note	%±
1880	452		—
1890	353		−21.9%
1900	384		8.8%
1910	365		−4.9%
1920	317		−13.2%
1930	347		9.5%
1940	336		−3.2%
1950	311		−7.4%
1960	215		−30.9%
1970	213		−0.9%
1980	253		18.8%
1990	204		−19.4%
2000	191		−6.4%
2010	171		−10.5%
2020	147		−14.0%
U.S. Decennial Census

=== 2010 census ===
As of the census of 2010, there were 171 people, 78 households, and 47 families living in the city. The population density was 657.7 inhabitants per square mile (253.9/km^{2}). There were 89 housing units at an average density of 342.3 per square mile (132.2/km^{2}). The racial makeup of the city was 98.8% White and 1.2% African American.

There were 78 households, of which 30.8% had children under the age of 18 living with them, 48.7% were married couples living together, 7.7% had a female householder with no husband present, 3.8% had a male householder with no wife present, and 39.7% were non-families. 38.5% of all households were made up of individuals, and 20.5% had someone living alone who was 65 years of age or older. The average household size was 2.19 and the average family size was 2.91.

The median age in the city was 44.8 years. 22.2% of residents were under the age of 18; 4.7% were between the ages of 18 and 24; 23.4% were from 25 to 44; 29.8% were from 45 to 64; and 19.9% were 65 years of age or older. The gender makeup of the city was 48.5% male and 51.5% female.

=== 2000 census ===
As of the census of 2000, there were 191 people, 85 households, and 52 families living in the town. The population density was 733.6 inhabitants per square mile (283.2/km^{2}). There were 99 housing units at an average density of 380.2 per square mile (146.8/km^{2}). The racial makeup of the town was 98.43% White, 0.52% African American, and 1.05% from two or more races.

There were 85 households, out of which 24.7% had children under the age of 18 living with them, 52.9% were married couples living together, 5.9% had a female householder with no husband present, and 38.8% were non-families. 32.9% of all households were made up of individuals, and 16.5% had someone living alone who was 65 years of age or older. The average household size was 2.25 and the average family size was 2.85.

In the town the population was spread out, with 23.0% under the age of 18, 5.2% from 18 to 24, 24.1% from 25 to 44, 26.7% from 45 to 64, and 20.9% who were 65 years of age or older. The median age was 44 years. For every 100 females there were 85.4 males. For every 100 females age 18 and over, there were 83.8 males.

The median income for a household in the town was $24,306, and the median income for a family was $40,250. Males had a median income of $28,750 versus $23,750 for females. The per capita income for the town was $13,816. About 17.6% of families and 21.6% of the population were below the poverty line, including 26.1% of those under the age of eighteen and 32.1% of those 65 or over.

== Notable people ==
- Marcus Morton Rhoades (1903–1991), geneticist, born in Graham

== Education ==
Nodaway-Holt R-VII School District is the local school district for the area, with an elementary school in Maitland and a junior-senior high and district headquarters in Graham.
