= Mozingo Lake Golf Course =

Golf course in Missouri

Mozingo
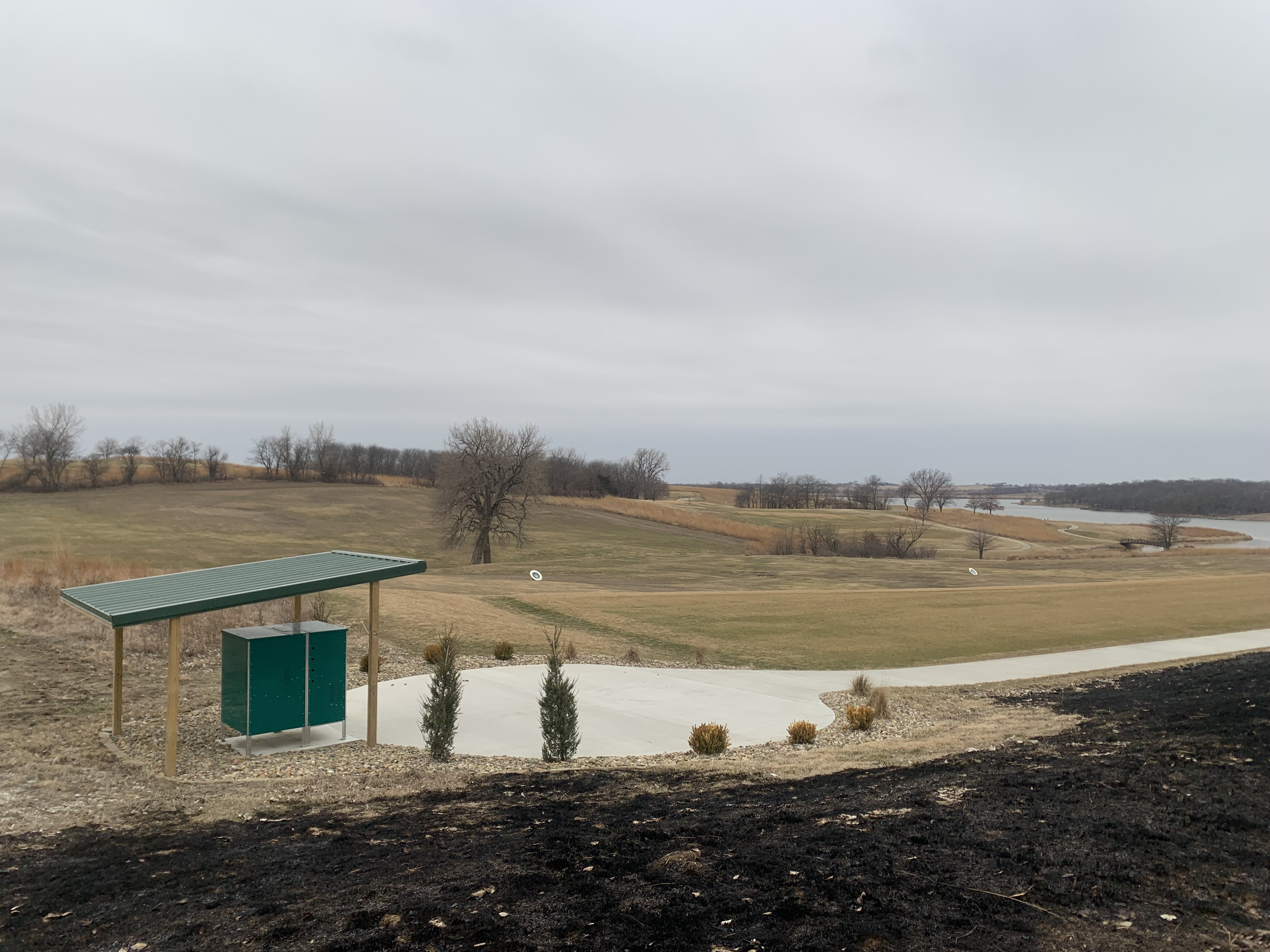
- Interactive map of Mozingo
- 40°21′31″N 94°45′52″W

Club information
- Location: Polk Township, Nodaway County, near Maryville, Missouri, USA
- Established: 1995
- Type: Public
- Owner: Maryville, Missouri
- Operator: Maryville, Missouri
- Total holes: 18
- Designed by: Donald Sechrest
- Par: 72
- Course rating: 74.8
- Slope rating: 137

The Mozingo Lake Golf Course is a 7,137 yard long, 18-hole municipal golf course on the banks of Mozingo Lake in Nodaway County, Missouri.

The course was designed by Donald Sechrest and opened in 1995 with PGA Golf Professional Rick Schultz. It is a par 72 course and has a rating of 73.5 and a slope rating of 134 on Rye grass. It is owned by the city of Maryville, Missouri. According to the city website, Golf Digest and USA Today call it the "best course to play in the state of Missouri for under $50."

The signature hole is #8, a 170-yard, par 3, requiring a tee shot over a pond to the green.

In 2016 a Junior 9 golf course designed by Tom Watson opened.
