= Donald Sechrest =

American golf course architect (1933–2006)

Personal information
- Full name: Donald Ray Sechrest
- Nationality: United States
- Born: February 16, 1933 St. Joseph, Missouri, U.S.
- Died: January 20, 2006 (aged 72)
- Children: Kent Sechrest, Kelly Wilson

Career
- Sport: Golf
- College: Oklahoma State University
- Status: Professional
- Former tour: PGA Tour

Best results in major championships
- Masters Tournament: DNP
- PGA Championship: CUT: 1961
- U.S. Open: CUT: 1961
- The Open Championship: DNP

Donald Ray Sechrest (February 16, 1933 – January 20, 2006) was an American designer of more than 90 golf courses mostly in the Midwest.

== Early life and amateur career ==
Sechrest was born in St. Joseph, Missouri where he attended Christian Brothers High School. He graduated in 1956 from Oklahoma State University where he played on the varsity golf team.

== Professional career ==
In the late 1950s, shortly after graduation, he started playing on the PGA Tour. Over the course of his career, he designed many courses. His first course was Stillwater Golf and Country Club in Stillwater, Oklahoma.

Other courses included:

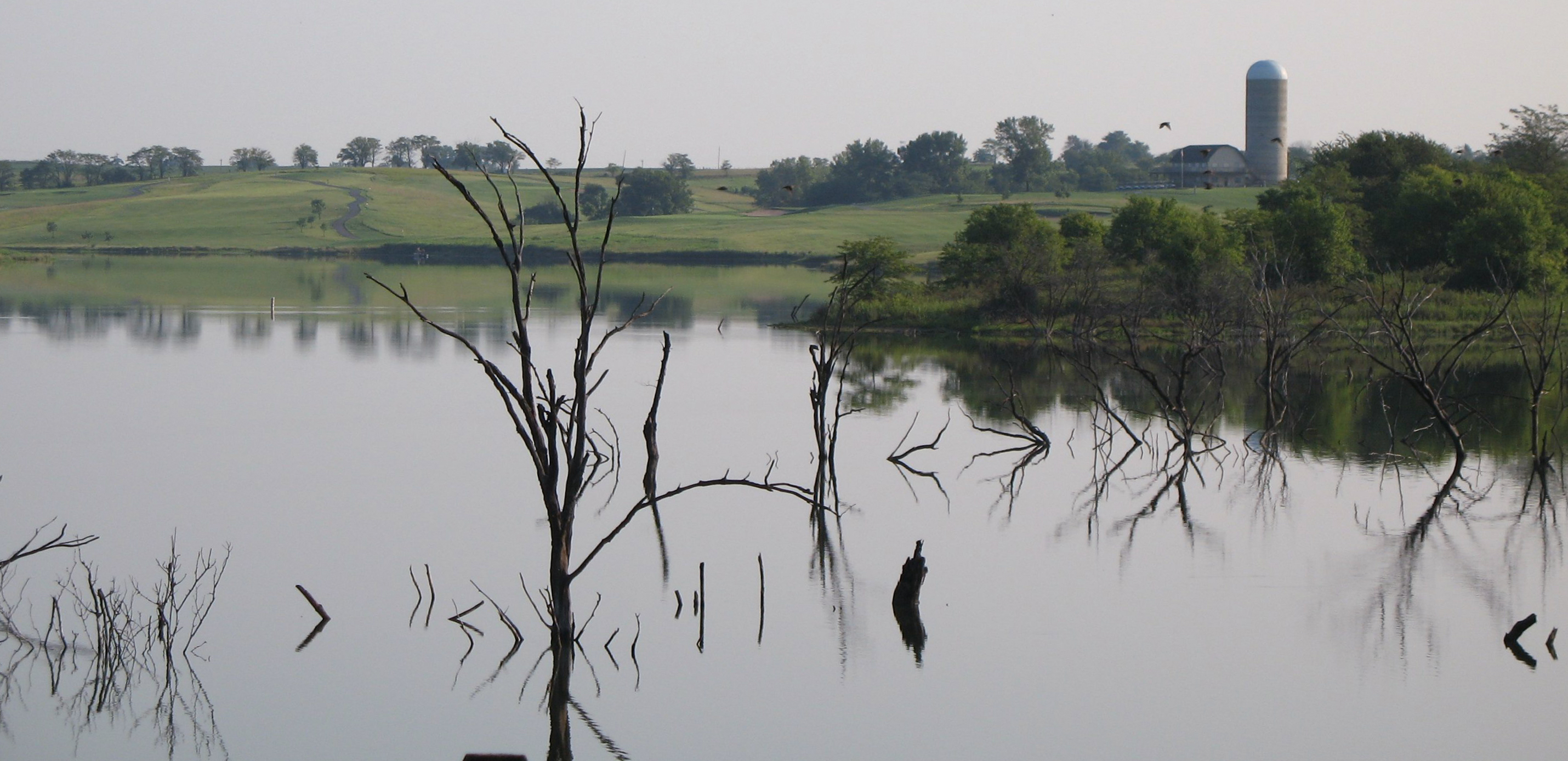
Mozingo Lake Golf Course

- Adams Pointe Golf Club - Blue Springs, Missouri
- Ames Golf & Country Club - Ames, Iowa
- Blue at Shangri-La Resort Afton, Oklahoma
- Boiling Springs Golf Course Woodward, Oklahoma
- Brownsville Golf & Recreation Center - Brownsville, Texas
- Elk City Golf & Country Club - Elk City, Oklahoma
- Fire Lake Golf Course - Shawnee, Oklahoma
- Gold at Shangri-La Resort - Afton, Oklahoma
- The Greens Country Club - Oklahoma City, Oklahoma
- Heritage Hills Golf Course - Claremore, Oklahoma
- Heritage Park Golf Course - Olathe, Kansas
- Landsmeer Golf Club - Orange City, Iowa
- Loch Lloyd Country Club - Loch Lloyd, Missouri
- Loma Linda Country Club - Joplin, Missouri
- Mozingo Lake Golf Course - Maryville, Missouri
- Pinnacle Country Club - Rogers, Arkansas
- Silo Ridge Golf & Country Club - Bolivar, Missouri
- The Golf Club at Southwind - Garden City, Kansas
- Stillwater Country Club - Stillwater, Oklahoma
- Stone Creek at Page Belcher Golf Course - Tulsa, Oklahoma
- Stroud Golf Course - Stroud, Oklahoma
- Terradyne Hotel & Country Club - Andover, Kansas
- Twin Hills Country Club - Joplin, Missouri
- Ixtapan Club de Golf in Ixtapan de la Sal, Mexico
- Windmill Course at Indian Springs Country Club Broken Arrow, OK
- Back Nine Meadowbrook Country Club Tulsa, OK
- Carthage Municipal Golf Course Carthage, MO

== Death ==
In 2006, Sechrest died. He was interred at Ixtapan de la Sal.
