= Nodaway County Historical Society Museum =

Memorabilia museum in Missouri

Coordinates: 40°20′47″N 94°52′40″W

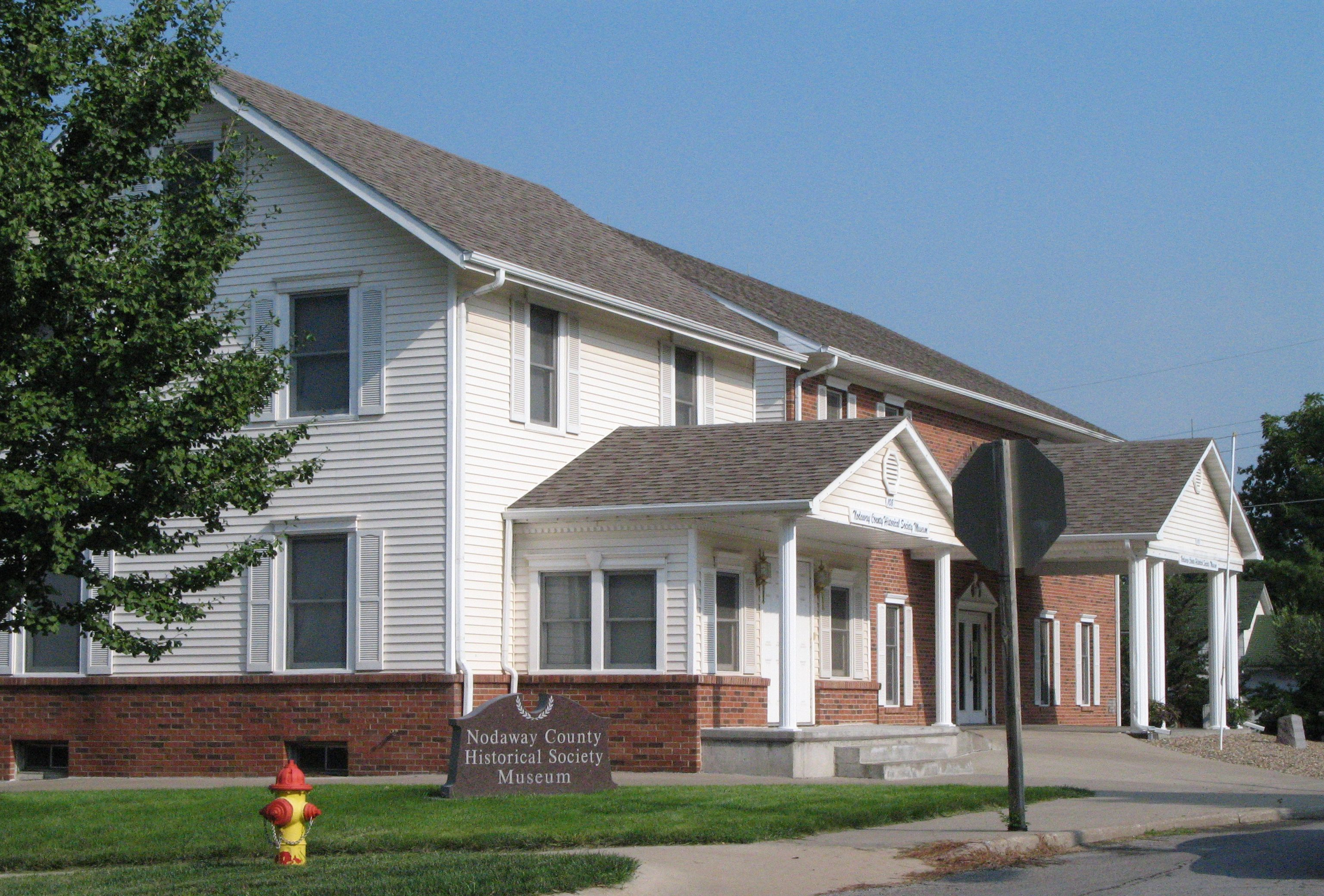
Nodaway County Historical Society Museum

The Nodaway County Historical Society Museum is a museum in Maryville, Missouri telling the history of Nodaway County, Missouri, United States.

The museum contains memorabilia from county residents Dale Carnegie, Homer Croy, Smiley Burnette, Lynne Overman, Sarah Caldwell, Alma Nash, Horace A. "Jimmy" Jones and Albert P. Morehouse.

It has a large collection of horse racing memorabilia from Calumet Farm and Triple Crown of Thoroughbred Racing Citation because of trainer Jimmy Jones.

The museum acquired the Caleb Burns House in 1977.

== Stairway of the Stars ==
Each year the museum inducts somebody with historic connections to the county. Many of those inducted have memorabilia in the museum. These include (ordered by date of induction oldest to newest):

- Lynne Overman, movie actor
- Smiley Burnette, movie actor
- Alma Nash, a performer with the 1923 Ziegfeld Follies who returned to Maryville to teach music
- Sarah Caldwell, first female director of Metropolitan Opera
- Byron Archibald Dunn, author of various books about the Civil War
- Hamline E. Robinson, editor of Maryville Republican who accumulated a 5,000 library of books about the occult. He was a brother of artist Theodore Robinson.
- Elizabeth E. Stewart Howell, inventor whose 1891 patent is important in the history of the Lazy Susan
- Lafayette “Lafe” Dawson, attorney in the late 1800s for whom the former town of Dawson is named.
- Charles Dilling Bellows, Shorthorn cattle breeder who was also president of the Missouri State Fair and American Royal
- Joseph W. Cornelison, Deputy Administrator of the Panama Canal Commission, who was the highest ranking United States representative when the Panama Canal was transferred to Panama in 1999
- Lester Swaney, manager for Faustiana Farms for 30 years who trained or owned several champion horses
- Horace A. "Jimmy" Jones, horse trainer for Calumet Farms who trained two horses that won the Kentucky Derby
- Edwin Harris Colbert, Curator of Vertebrate Paleontology at the American Museum of Natural History for 40 years
- John D. Hicks, historian who held positions at the University of Nebraska, University of Wisconsin, and University of California, Berkeley
- Hollis Newcomb White, holder of many patents regarding hydraulics
- Frank Felton, international expert on hereford breed.
- Bill Tobin, pro football manager and general manager of the Chicago Bears and Indianapolis Colts
- Vince Tobin, coach of the Arizona Cardinals
- Robert Partridge, head of the National Rural Electric Cooperative Association and a major general of the Civil Affairs Branch of the U.S. Army Reserves.
- Emma Holt Prather, first woman breeder of a Kentucky Derby winner (Elwood at Faustiana Farm)
- John S. Bilby, owner of Bilby Ranch which sprawled from Missouri across the Southwest and was claimed to be the biggest in the United States
- Jesse D. Taylor, a World War II fighter pilot who owned LMP Steel
- Don Hollingsworth, develops and sells peonies throughout the world from his business Hollingsworth Peonies.
- Edward V. Condon, served with Harry Truman in 129th Field Artillery Regiment in France during World War I. He operated Condon's Corner Drug on the square in Maryville.
- Garvin Williams, who had a bluegrass lawn seed business and founded other businesses in Maryville including KNIM radio, Nodaway Lanes and B&W Sporting Goods.
- Leo Baumli, mule farmer whose mules included one the Gunsmoke mules named Ruth that belonged to Festus Haggen.
- Uel W. Lamkin, Northwest Missouri president
