= George S.E. Vaughn =

George S. E. Vaughn (sometimes spelled George Vaughan or George E. Vaughn) (c. 1823 – August 26, 1899) was a convicted Confederate spy during the American Civil War who claimed to have been pardoned by Abraham Lincoln an hour before Lincoln's assassination, in the President's last official act.

Vaughn's claim was widely circulated at the time of his death in 1899, including in The New York Times. However, in 2011, David Blanchette, director of the Abraham Lincoln Presidential Library and Museum in Springfield, Illinois, said there is no formal document in the archives verifying the claim. Interest in the claim was spurred in January 2011, when the National Archives announced that Thomas P. Lowry, a "longtime Lincoln researcher," confessed on January 12, 2011, to changing the date of a pardon in the National Archives of a different soldier from April 14, 1864, to April 14, 1865, in order to enhance his credentials as a historian.

== Life ==
According to his obituary, Vaughn was born in Virginia and moved to Canton, Missouri. He was recruited into the Confederate Missouri State Guard by Martin E. Green, brother of U.S. Senator James S. Green. Green, while camping at Tupelo, Mississippi, dispatched Vaughn to deliver letters to his wife in Canton. Vaughn was captured six miles south of Canton at La Grange, Missouri. The letters were found, and Vaughn was accused of being a spy and was sentenced to be shot.

Missouri Senator John B. Henderson intervened with Lincoln to get a new trial, but the verdict was the same. Henderson got Lincoln to approve yet a third trial and again the verdict was the same. On the afternoon of April 14, 1865, Henderson appealed once more to the president, telling him, "Mr. Lincoln, this pardon should be granted in the interest of peace and conciliation." Lincoln is said to have replied, "Senator, I agree with you. Go to Stanton and tell him this man must be released."

Henderson went to the office of Secretary of War Edwin Stanton. Stanton refused, saying the execution was to be carried out in two days. Henderson returned to the White House, where he met the president dressed to go to Ford's Theatre. Lincoln wrote a message on official stationery—an order for an unconditional release and pardon—allegedly telling Henderson, "I think that will have precedence over Stanton."

After the war, Vaughn moved to Maryville, Missouri, where he died in 1899.
