= Amos Graham =

American politician

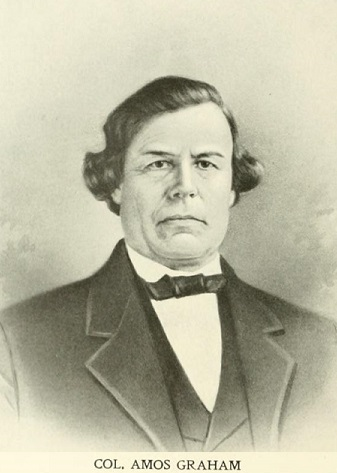

1st Nodaway County, Missouri, clerk

Personal details
- Born: 14 March 1816
- Died: 14 September 1865 (aged 49)

Amos Graham (March 14, 1816 – September 14, 1865) was the first Nodaway County, Missouri, clerk. Graham is immortalized in the town of Graham, Missouri, as it is named after him. The town of Maryville, Missouri, is named after his wife, Mary.

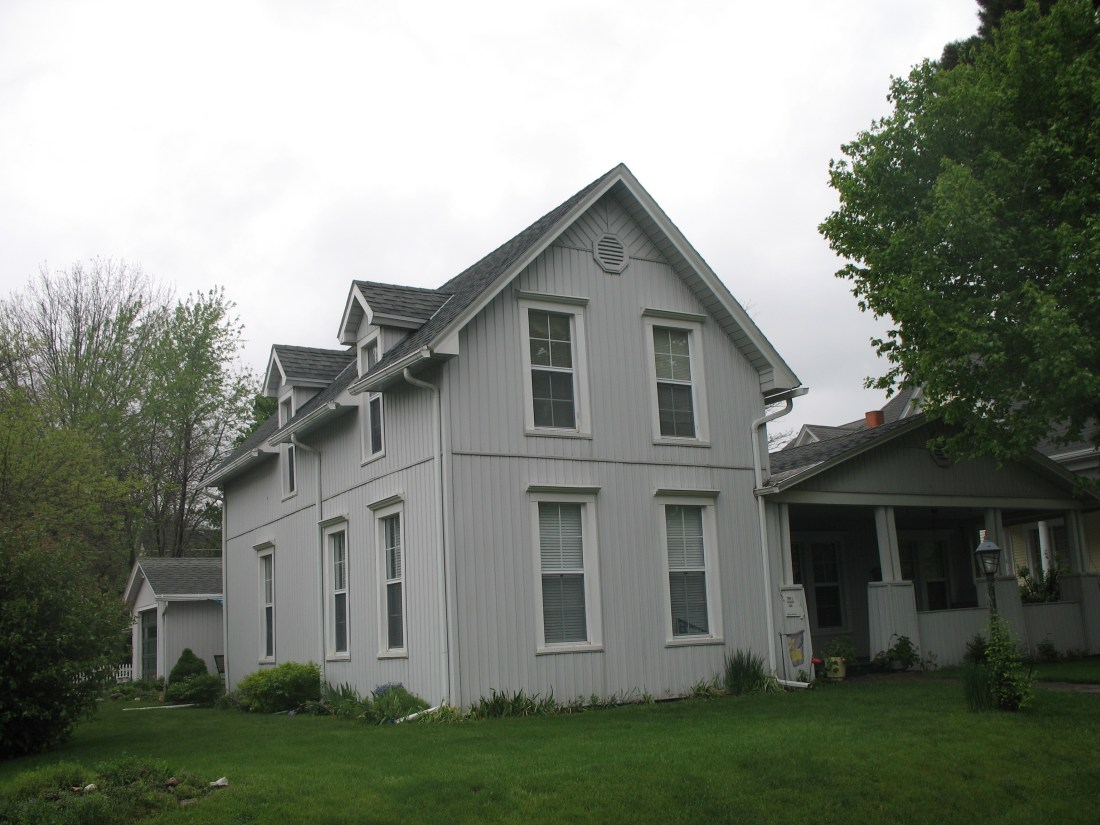
Home of Mary Graham at 422 South Buchanan in Maryville. Mary moved here after her husband Amos died. She died in 1903.

Graham was born and raised in Washington County, Kentucky. He studied English and became a schoolteacher, moving to Hancock County, Illinois, in 1836 to teach. He returned to Washington County, Kentucky, and in 1839 or 1840 ran an unsuccessful campaign for state representative in the Kentucky General Assembly. He married Mary Jane House on January 9, 1842, and moved to Savannah, Missouri, during the early settlement days of the Platte Purchase territory, where he continued his teaching career. Graham became one of the original settlers of Nodaway County. He was appointed county clerk when Nodaway County organized on February 14, 1845, and served until 1858 and was said to be the first postmaster in the newly created town of Maryville. Amos Graham held several political offices in Nodaway County: Commissioner, Circuit Clerk, County Clerk, Postmaster, and County Recorder. During the Mexican-American War, he held the rank of colonel in the Missouri Militia, but his unit was never deployed to Mexico nor saw military action.

He represented Nodaway County in the Missouri General Assembly in1860-1861 at the outbreak of the American Civil War. Although a plurality of county voters supported Stephen A. Douglas in the 1860 United States Presidential Election, Graham was elected state representative on the Breckinridge States' Rights Democratic ticket when he convinced supporters of Abraham Lincoln to vote in his favor. Missouri held a Constitutional Convention in 1861 following the attack on Fort Sumter, South Carolina, to consider seceding from the Union. Graham was a southern sympathizer and voted for Missouri's secession from the Union. However, the motion was defeated and Missouri officially remained in the Union. Graham left the Missouri House of Representatives after his single term and did not run for office again.

He died on September 14, 1865, of typhoid fever.
