= Hughes Township, Nodaway County, Missouri =

Township in Nodaway County, Missouri, U.S.

Hughes Township
- Township
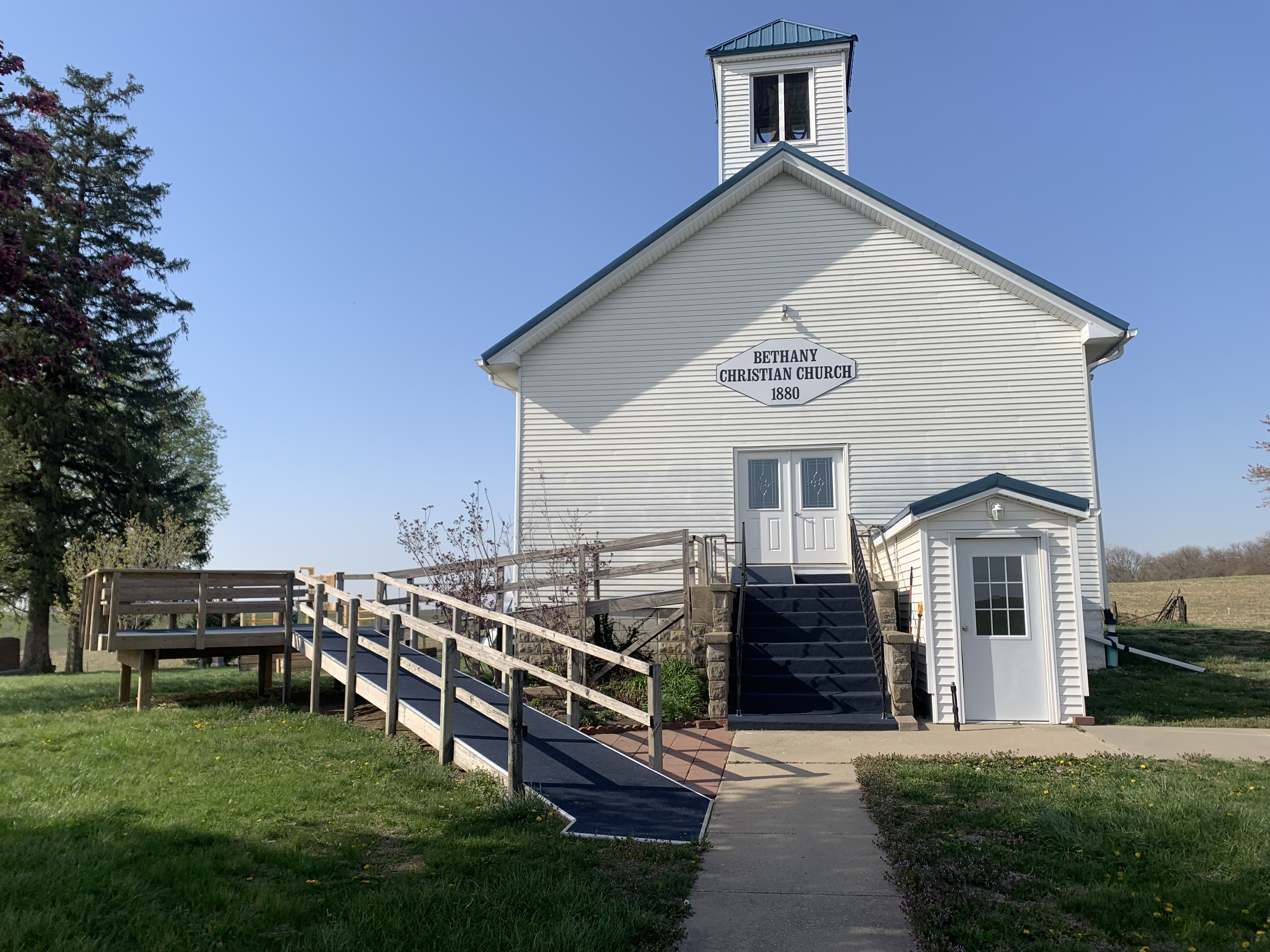
- Bethany Christian Church in Hughes Township

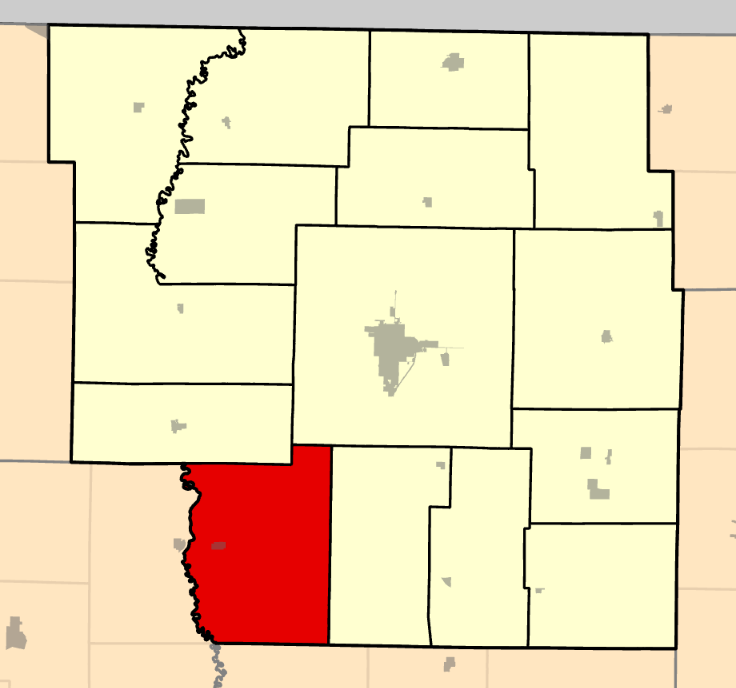
- Coordinates: 40°11′42″N 94°59′58″W
- Country: United States
- State: Missouri
- County: Nodaway
- Erected: 1845

Area
  - Total: 64.28 sq mi (166.5 km^{2})
  - Land: 64.22 sq mi (166.3 km^{2})
  - Water: 0.06 sq mi (0.16 km^{2}) 0.09%
- Elevation: 978 ft (298 m)

Population (2020)
  - Total: 411
  - Density: 6.4/sq mi (2.5/km^{2})
- FIPS code: 29-14733634
- GNIS feature ID: 767088

Hughes Township is a township in Nodaway County, Missouri, United States. At the 2020 census, its population was 411. It comprises about 62 sections of land. Graham is its lone town which lies about two miles east of the Nodaway River.

== History ==
Hughes Township was established in 1845, and named after General Andrew S. Hughes, a pioneer citizen. The township's area was reduced in 1866 when Monroe Township was formed.

== Settlements ==
A settlement called Stringtown was located in the far-east of this township between Graham and Barnard. Another settlement called Hughes once existed near White Cloud Creek.

== Transportation ==
The following highways travel through the township:

- Route A
- Route H
- Route TT
- Route Y
- Route ZZ
