= Thomas P. Lowry =

American author and physician (1932–2023)

- Born: Thomas Power Lowry; November 24, 1932; Northern California, U.S.
- Died: March 22, 2023 (aged 90); Petaluma, California, U.S.
- Education: Stanford University (MD)
- Occupations: Author, psychiatrist
- Notable work: The Story the Soldiers Wouldn't Tell
- Spouses: Norma McCoy (divorced); Frances Smith (divorced); Thea Snyder (divorced); Beverly Montooth (d. 2018)

Thomas Power Lowry (November 24, 1932 – March 22, 2023) was an American author and physician. A psychiatrist by training, he turned in the 1990s to writing historical non-fiction about the American Civil War. His reputation was damaged in 2011 when he made – and subsequently recanted – a written confession that he had tampered with a document signed by President Abraham Lincoln held in the U.S. National Archives.

== Early life and medical career ==
Lowry was born in Northern California, the elder son of Richard and Margaret Lowry. His father was a naval officer. He received an M.D. from Stanford University in 1957, later practicing as a psychiatrist and marriage counsellor. In the 1970s he and then-wife Thea Snyder Lowry (1932–2002; sister of poet Gary Snyder) served on the staff of the Masters and Johnson Clinic in St. Louis as part of the research team investigating sexual dynamics and relationships. During this period Lowry published what he would later describe as "several very dull medical books." Nonetheless, his 1976 work on the human clitoris was positively reviewed in the Journal of Sex Research. He was later a clinical associate professor at the University of California, San Francisco.

== Later writing career ==
After retiring from a four-decade career in medicine, Lowry – assisted by a new wife, Beverly – shifted in the 1990s to writing non-fiction historical works. He authored or co-authored more than 20 books in this field, the majority dealing with the American Civil War period. Much of the Lowrys' research was carried out at the U.S. National Archives in Washington, D.C., where, over the course of a decade, the Lowrys compiled a large index of thousands of previously uncatalogued Civil War documents. Lowry's first and best-known book on this subject, The Story the Soldiers Wouldn't Tell (1994), received a favorable review in The New York Times as "the first study of sexual behavior associated with the Civil War," and was praised in Esquire as "amusing and fascinating." Two subsequent works on Civil War courts-martial, Tarnished Eagles (1998) and Tarnished Scalpels (2000; co-authored with Jack D. Welsh), were well-reviewed in Civil War Times and Kirkus Reviews, respectively. Lowry occasionally published on other historic events, such as the Battle of Taranto and the sinking of the Titanic. His 2004 book on the Lewis and Clark Expedition earned an award from the Lewis and Clark Trail Heritage Foundation.

== Lincoln document forgery controversy ==
In January 2011, agents of the National Archives and Records Administration (NARA) obtained a signed confession from Lowry that in 1998 he had smuggled a fountain pen into a NARA research room in Washington D.C., and used it to alter the date on a presidential pardon issued by Abraham Lincoln to a Union soldier who had been sentenced to death by court martial. A NARA press release announced that Lowry admitted to changing the handwritten year of the 1864 pardon so that Lincoln's signature appeared to be dated "April 14, 1865" – the same day Lincoln was assassinated at Ford's Theatre. Lowry had cited the altered document in his 1999 book Don't Shoot That Boy! Abraham Lincoln and Military Justice. It was alleged that Lowry's motive was to gain publicity by claiming that he, as an independent researcher, had found what would have been the final official document signed by President Lincoln before his death.

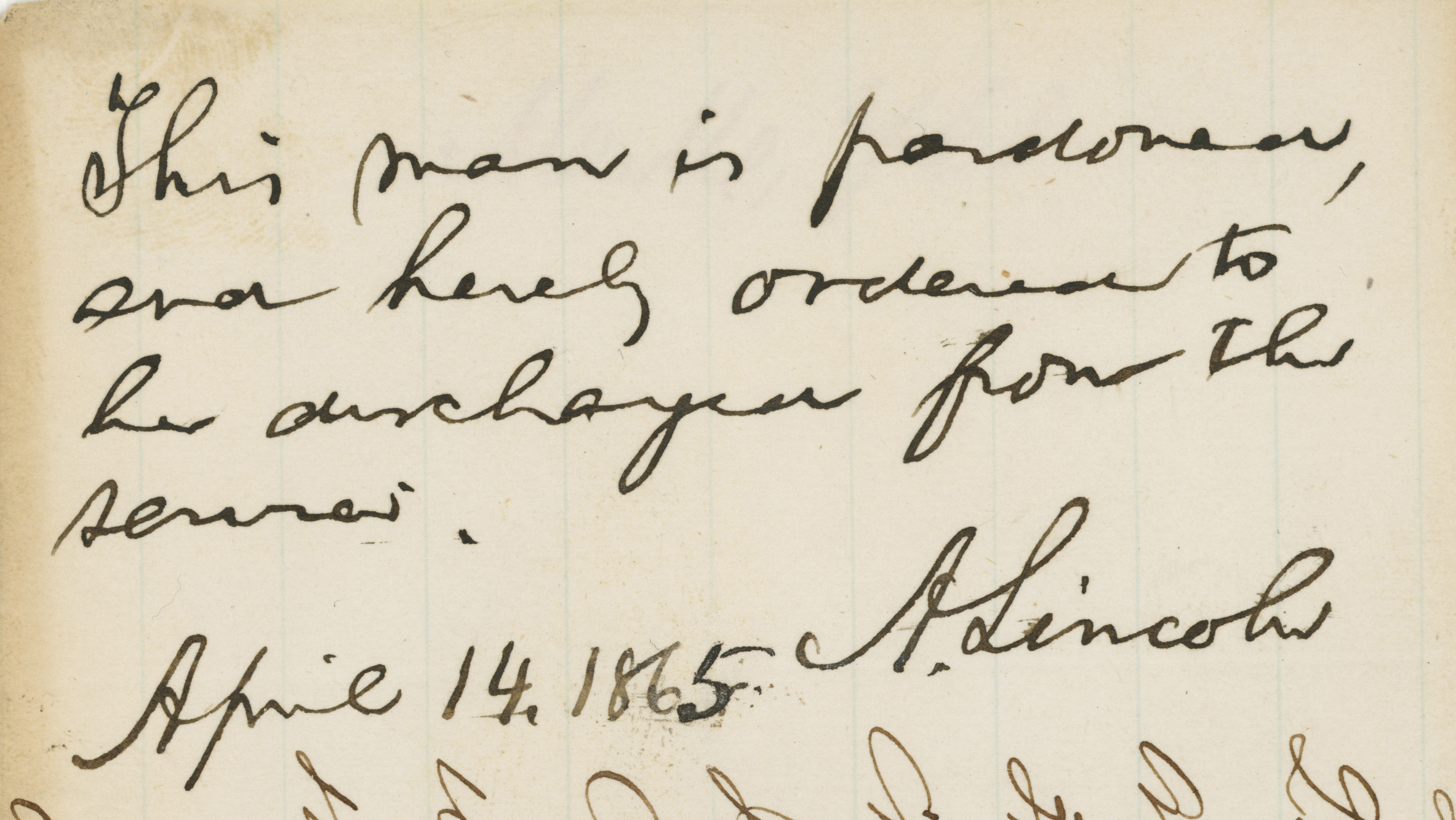
Detail of the Lincoln pardon with handwritten year altered from 1864 to "1865".

Lowry subsequently recanted his confession, in which he detailed how he used a fountain pen containing fade-proof, pigment-based ink to alter the date of the pardon. He maintained that he signed the confession under duress after accepting a request to be interviewed by two NARA investigators at his home in Woodville, Virginia, and that any document-tampering was carried out by an unknown party prior to Lowry citing the pardon.

As the pertinent five-year statute of limitations on tampering with government property had expired, Lowry could not be criminally prosecuted. Nevertheless, his public reputation was severely damaged, and he received a lifetime ban from NARA's facilities. In 2021, forensic analysis of the pardon established that the ink of the number "5" in the date is different from the ink used in the rest of the document, indicating that the date was indeed forged.

Lowry continued to produce history books until his death, and maintained his innocence through his personal website.

== Personal life ==
Lowry was married four times and had three children; his first three marriages ended in divorce, and his fourth wife, Beverly, predeceased him in 2018. He died in Petaluma, California, on March 22, 2023.

== Bibliography ==
=== Medical works ===
- Hyperventilation and Hysteria (1967)
- Camping Therapy: its uses in psychiatry and rehabilitation (1973), as editor. ISBN 978-0-398-02898-5
- The Clitoris (1976), edited with Thea Snyder Lowry. ISBN 978-0-87527-112-5
- The Classic Clitoris: Historic contributions to scientific sexuality (1978), as editor. ISBN 978-0-88229-387-5

=== Historical works ===
- The Story the Soldiers Wouldn't Tell: Sex in the Civil War (1994). ISBN 978-0-8117-1153-1
- The Attack on Taranto: Blueprint for Pearl Harbor (1995), with John Wellham. ISBN 978-0-8117-1726-7
- The Civil War Bawdy Houses of Washington, D.C. (1997) ISBN 978-1-887901-14-7
- Tarnished Eagles: The Courts-Martial of Fifty Union Colonels and Lieutenant Colonels (1998) (reprinted as Curmudgeons, Drunkards, and Outright Fools: The Courts-Martial of Civil War Union Colonels) ISBN 978-0-8117-1597-3
- Don't Shoot That Boy! Abraham Lincoln and Military Justice (1999) ISBN 978-1-882810-38-3
- Tarnished Scalpels: The Court-Martials of Fifty Union Surgeons (2000), with Jack D. Welsh. ISBN 978-0-8117-1603-1
- Swamp Doctor: The Diary of a Union Surgeon in the Virginia & North Carolina Marshes (2001), as editor. ISBN 978-0-8117-1537-9
- Venereal Disease and the Lewis and Clark Expedition (2004) ISBN 978-0-8032-2959-4
- Confederate Heroines: 120 Southern Women Convicted by Union Military Justice (2006) ISBN 978-0-8071-2990-6
- Sexual Misbehavior in the Civil War (2006) ISBN 978-1-4257-1949-4
- Andersonville to Tahiti: The Story of Dorence Atwater (2008) ISBN 978-1-4392-0552-5
- Mystery of the Bones: Syphilis, The Lewis and Clark Expedition, and the Arikara Indians (2008), with P. Willey. ISBN 978-0-615-19033-4
- Love and Lust: Private and Amorous Letters of the Civil War (2009) ISBN 978-1-4392-5304-5
- Confederate Death Sentences: A Reference Guide (2009), with Lewis Laska. ISBN 978-1-4392-1474-9
- Merciful Lincoln: The President and Military Justice (2010) ISBN 978-1-4392-6182-8
- Utterly Worthless: One Thousand Delinquent Union Officers Unworthy of a Court-Martial (2010) ISBN 978-1-4505-4510-5
- Bad Doctors: Military Justice Proceedings Against 622 Civil War Surgeons (2011), with Terry Reimer. ISBN 978-1-4538-1085-9
- Irish & German Whiskey & Beer: Drinking Patterns in the Civil War (2011) ISBN 978-1-4636-4898-5
- Capital Courtesans: Public Women of Civil War Richmond and Washington D.C. (2011) (reprinted as Primrose Path: A Biblical-Sociological Study of the Ladies of the Evening in Civil War Richmond and Washington, DC) ISBN 978-1-4664-1844-8
- Civil War Rockets (2012) ISBN 978-1-4700-2983-8
- Lost Lincolns: Thirty-five Opinions in Lincoln's own hand not previously published (2012) ISBN 978-1-4801-4563-4
- Titanic Madness: What Really Sank the Great Ship (2012) ISBN 978-1-4783-4269-4
- A Thousand Stories You Don't Know About the Civil War (2014) ISBN 978-1-4952-2175-0
- Civil War Venereal Disease Hospitals (2014) ISBN 978-1-5024-3704-4
- More Stories You Don't Know About the Civil War (2015) ISBN 978-1-5032-3068-2
- Galvanized Virginians in the Indian Wars (2016) ISBN 978-0-692-55074-8
- The Yankees' Secret Weapon: Even Lincoln Didn't Know (2016) ISBN 978-0-692-68244-9
- Was Grandpa a Freeloader? Civil War Pension Claims: North & South (2016) ISBN 978-1-945687-00-6
- A Tourist Guide to Civil War Washington, D.C. (2017) ISBN 978-1-945687-03-7
- Three Brothers: Death and Love in the Civil War (2017) ISBN 978-1-945687-04-4

=== Autobiography ===
- Stark Naked with a Flit Gun: Fifty Years in Psychiatry, A Memoir (2019) ISBN 978-1-945687-06-8
