= Charles Franks House =

Historic house in Illinois, United States

- U.S. National Register of Historic Places
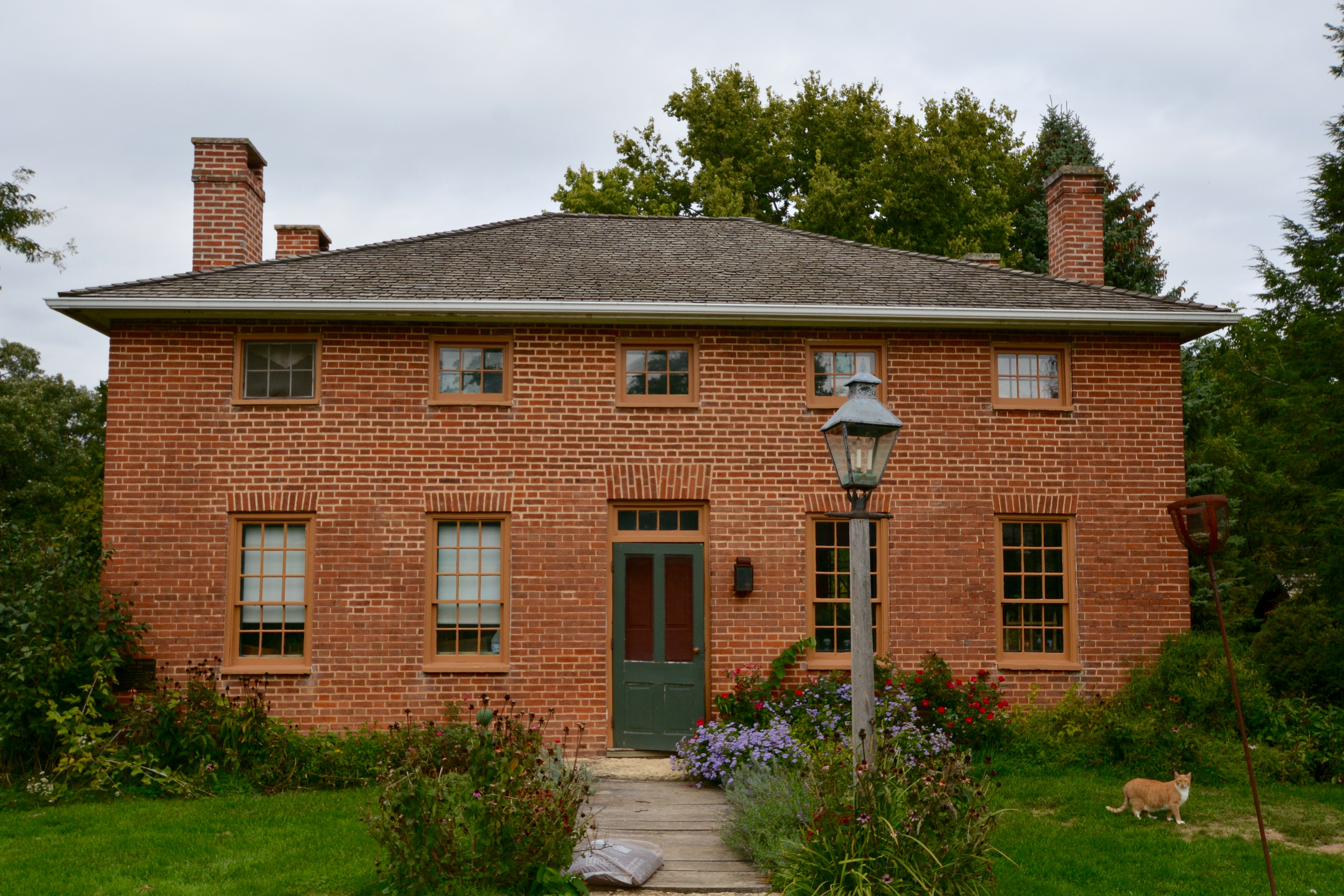

- Location within Illinois Location within the United States
- Nearest city: Lanark, Illinois
- Coordinates: 42°3′47″N 89°41′51″W
- Area: 8.1 acres (3.3 ha)
- Built: c. 1850
- NRHP reference No.: 98000459
- Added to NRHP: May 20, 1998

The Charles Franks House is a historic house located at 34431 U.S. Route 52 east of Lanark, Illinois. The house was built circa 1850 by Charles Franks, a prominent settler and local landowner. The site of the house had previously been home to Isaac Chambers' tavern and stagecoach stop on the Galena Road; the tavern also became a shelter for troops and a target for warring Native Americans in the Black Hawk War. The house's design is a vernacular implementation of the Federal style, which was prevalent in the United States earlier in the 19th century but had faded from popularity by 1850. While the house features the style's typical hipped roof and jack arch lintels above the windows, it is smaller than most Federal houses and is missing characteristic decorations such as a fanlight above the front door.

The house was added to the National Register of Historic Places on May 20, 1998.
