= Henry Franks House =

Historic house in Michigan, United States

- U.S. National Register of Historic Places
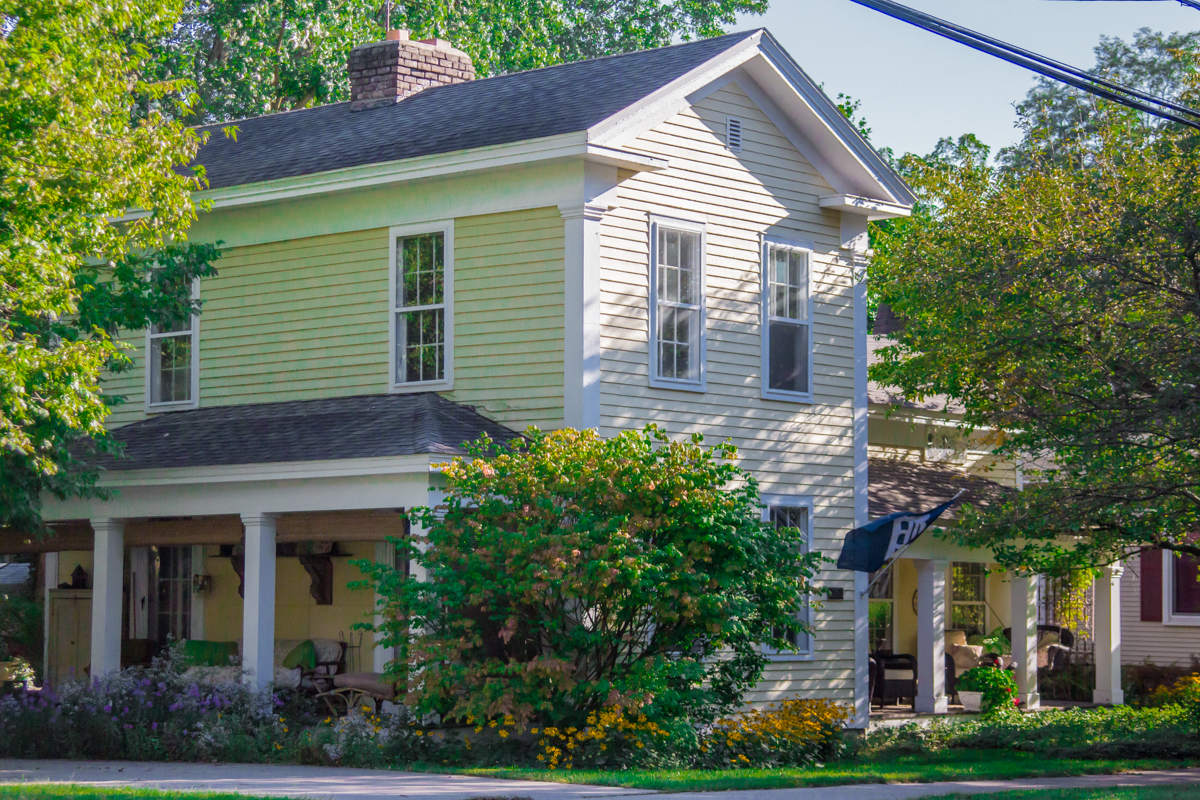

- Location within Michigan Location within the United States
- Interactive map
- Location: 535 Ely St., Allegan, Michigan
- Coordinates: 42°31′26″N 85°51′33″W
- Area: less than one acre
- Built: 1860
- Architectural style: Greek Revival
- MPS: Allegan MRA
- NRHP reference No.: 87000252
- Added to NRHP: March 12, 1987

The Henry Franks House is a private house located at 535 Ely Street in Allegan, Michigan. It was added to the National Register of Historic Places in 1987.

== History ==
The Henry Franks House was built in about 1860. It was likely moved from the downtown area to its present location in the late 19th century.

== Description ==
The Henry Franks House is a two-story frame Greek Revival upright and wing house with clapboard siding. It has a wide, continuous band beneath the cornice and corner pilasters rising to meet it. Porches with square columns are constructed in a similar style.
