= Caleb Burns House =

Historic house in Missouri, United States

- U.S. National Register of Historic Places
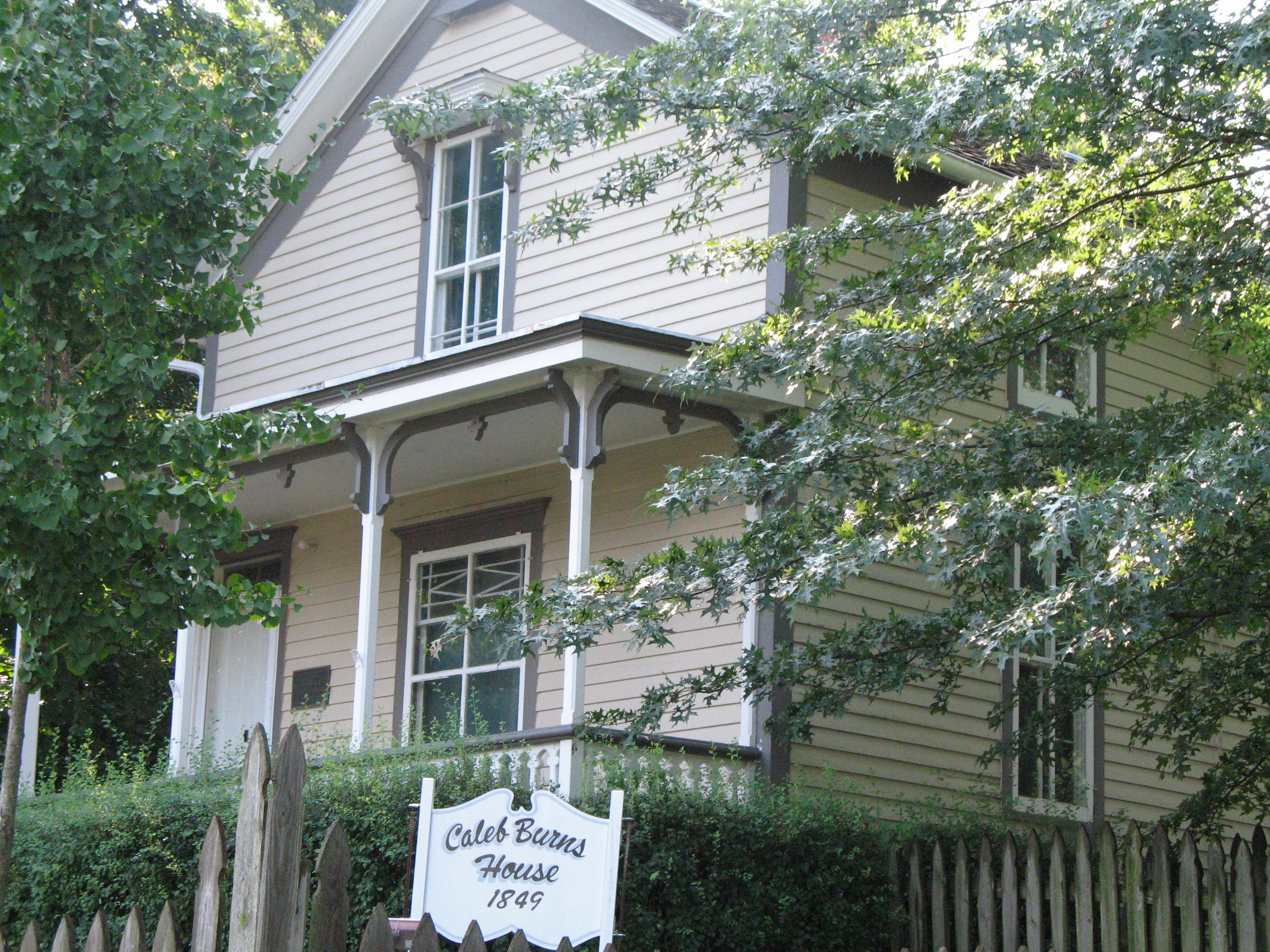
- Caleb Burns House, August 2006

- Location within Missouri Location within the United States
- Location: 422 W. 2nd St., Maryville, Missouri
- Coordinates: 40°20′48.7″N 94°52′39.3″W
- Area: 0.3 acres (0.12 ha)
- Built: 1846
- Built by: Burns, Caleb P.
- NRHP reference No.: 80002385
- Added to NRHP: November 17, 1980

Caleb Burns House is a historic home located at Maryville, Nodaway County, Missouri. It was built about 1846, and is a two-story, rectangular frame dwelling with Greek Revival style detailing. It has a one-story rear ell and sits on a brick foundation. It is the oldest surviving home in Maryville. The Nodaway County Historical Society acquired the property in 1977.

It was listed on the National Register of Historic Places in 1980.
