= Simpson's College =

- U.S. National Register of Historic Places
- Location within Missouri Location within the United States
- Location: 515 E. Jackson St., Graham, Missouri
- Coordinates: 40°12′1″N 95°2′1″W
- Area: 0.1 acres (0.040 ha)
- Built: c. 1860
- NRHP reference No.: 78001670
- Added to NRHP: January 30, 1978

Simpson's College, also known as Simpson's College Museum, was a historic school building located at Graham, Nodaway County, Missouri. It was built about 1860, and is a one-story, rectangular frame building, measuring approximately 20 feet by 28 feet. A school occupied the building until 1869, after which it became a private residence. The structure was demolished in 2009.

It was listed on the National Register of Historic Places in 1978.
