= Frank House (footballer) =

Australian rules footballer (1884–1963)

Personal information
- Full name: Francis George House
- Born: 22 February 1884; St Kilda, Victoria
- Died: 23 February 1963 (aged 79); Box Hill, Victoria
- Original team: Elwood

Playing career^{1}
Years	Club	Games (Goals)
1905	St Kilda	3 (1)
- ^{1} Playing statistics correct to the end of 1905.

Francis George House (22 February 1884 – 23 February 1963) was an Australian rules footballer who played with St Kilda in the Victorian Football League (VFL).
