= Joseph M. Frank House =

Historic house in Arkansas, United States

- U.S. National Register of Historic Places
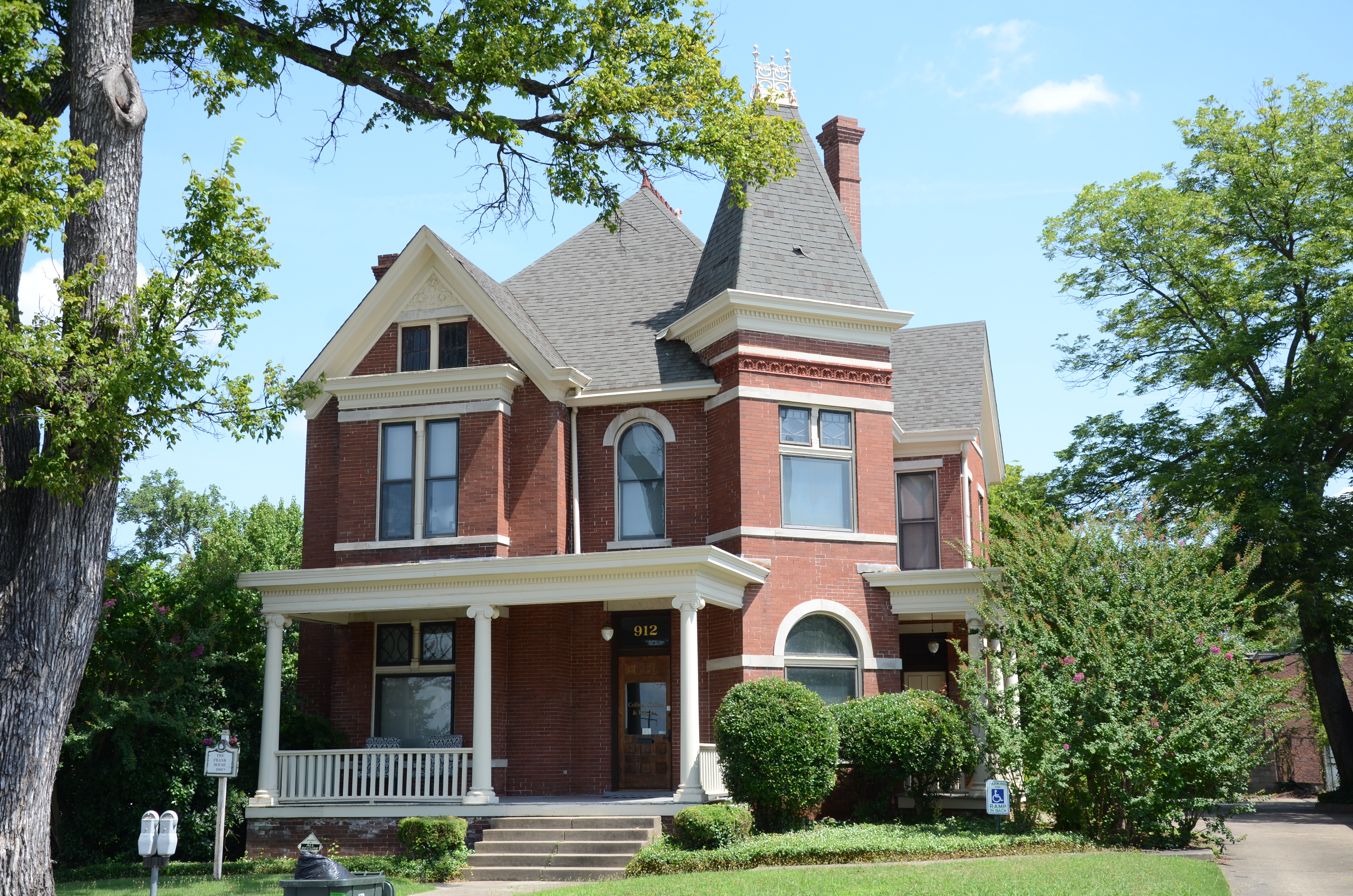

- Location within Arkansas Location within the United States
- Location: 912 W. Fourth, Little Rock, Arkansas
- Coordinates: 34°45′2″N 92°16′41″W
- Area: less than one acre
- Built: 1900
- Architectural style: Queen Anne, Classical Revival, Free Classical
- NRHP reference No.: 85002716
- Added to NRHP: October 3, 1985

The Joseph M. Frank House is a historic house at 912 West Fourth Street in Little Rock, Arkansas. It is a two-story wood-frame structure, with a brick veneer exterior, and asymmetrical massing typical of the Queen Anne style. It has a variety of gabled projections, recesses, and porches, as well as a projecting angled corner turret. A single-story porch extending across part of the front is supported by Colonial Revival Ionic columns. The house was built in 1900 for a local businessman, and was for many years divided into apartments or professional offices.

The house was listed on the National Register of Historic Places in 1985.

== See also ==
- National Register of Historic Places listings in Little Rock, Arkansas
