= Maryville, Missouri =

- City
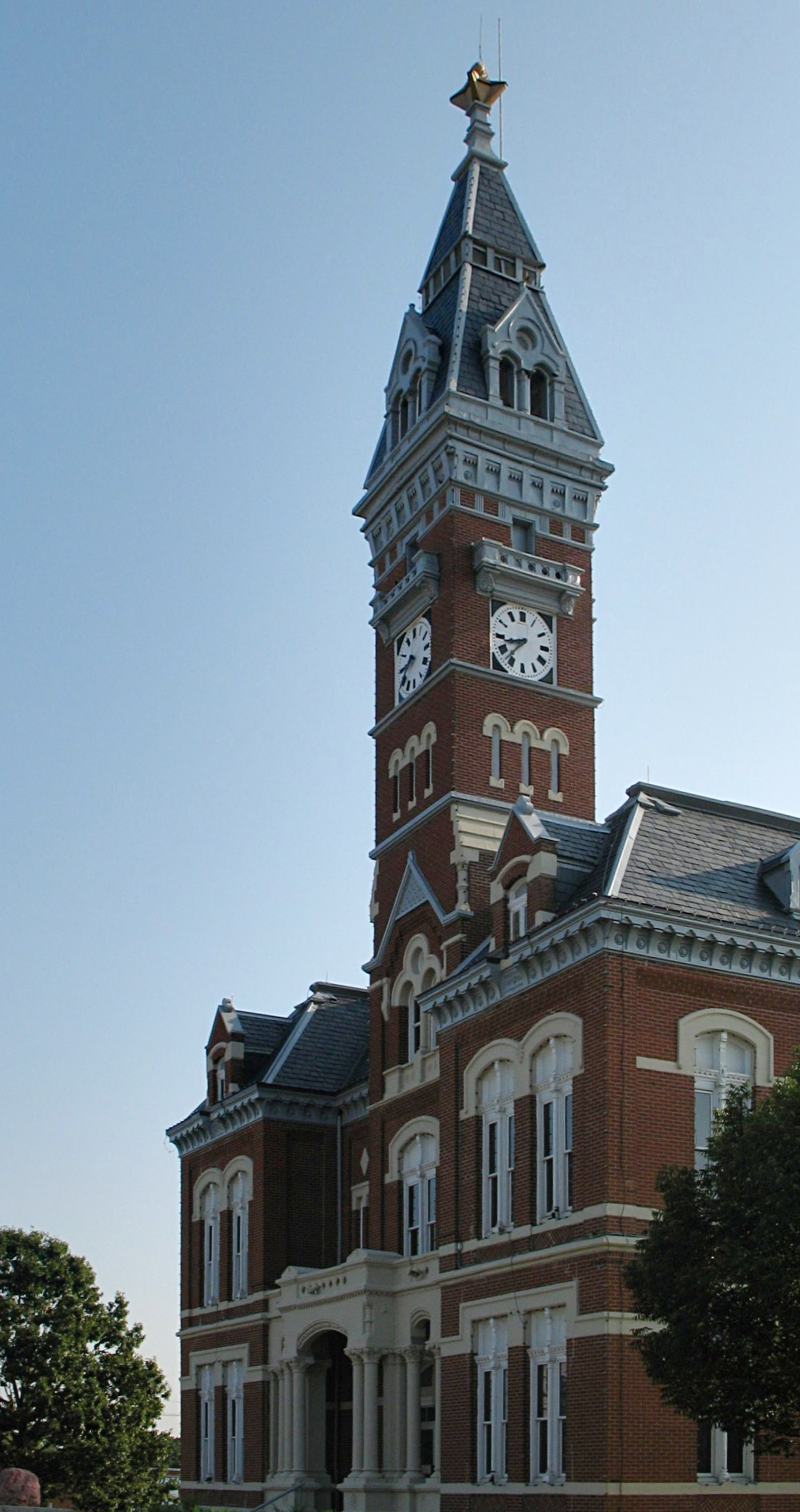
- Nodaway County Courthouse, 2006
- Nickname: Title Town
- Location within Nodaway County and Missouri

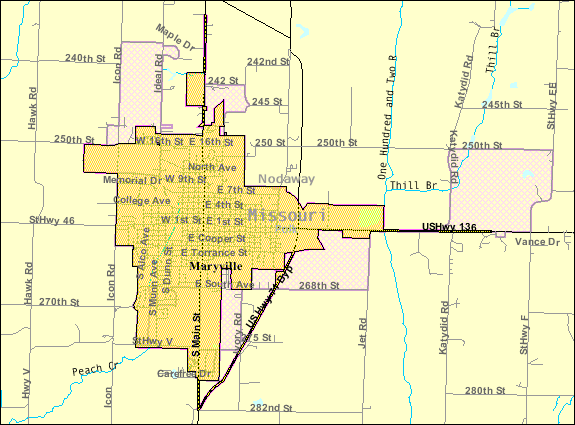
- U.S. Census Map of Maryville
- Coordinates: 40°20′43″N 94°52′16″W
- Country: United States
- State: Missouri
- County: Nodaway
- Township: Polk
- Platted: 1845

Government
  - Type: Mayor–Council
  - Mayor: John McBride
  - Mayor Pro Tem: Bryan Williams

Area
  - Total: 6.41 sq mi (16.59 km^{2})
  - Land: 6.37 sq mi (16.51 km^{2})
  - Water: 0.031 sq mi (0.08 km^{2})
- Elevation: 1,106 ft (337 m)

Population (2020)
  - Total: 10,633
  - Estimate (2024): 10,193
  - Density: 1,668.1/sq mi (644.06/km^{2})
- Time zone: UTC-6 (CST)
  - Summer (DST): UTC-5 (CDT)
- ZIP code: 64468
- Area code: 660
- FIPS code: 29-46640
- GNIS feature ID: 2395037
- Website: City website

Maryville is a city in and the county seat of Nodaway County, Missouri, United States. Located in the "Missouri Point" region, the city population was 10,633, according to the 2020 Census. Maryville is home to Northwest Missouri State University and Northwest Technical School. Maryville is the second-largest city (behind St. Joseph, Missouri) wholly within the boundaries of the 1836 Platte Purchase which expanded Missouri's borders into former Indian Territory in northwest Missouri.

== History ==
Maryville was platted on September 1, 1845.

Maryville's name originates from the town's first postmaster, Amos Graham. Graham was one of the original settlers of what would later become downtown Maryville, and the city was named after his wife, Mary. In addition to his above historical role, Graham was also one of the original Nodaway County Commissioners and served as the first county clerk when the county was formally organized in 1845. Maryville, which is near the geographic center of Nodaway County, was also named the county seat in the same year. It has also been stylized as Marysville.

The first house in Maryville was built by Jack (John) Saunders, who was a large slave owner. The first courthouse was built in 1846. Formerly, county government affairs would be held in the home of an early settler, I.N. Prather. An updated courthouse was constructed in 1853, the second of only three in the city's history. The current courthouse was built in 1881 with a design by Edmond Jacques Eckel and George R. Mann. Mann would later go on to design the Arkansas State Capitol. The courthouse is currently listed on the National Register of Historic Places and is adorned with a sculpture of a pineapple, the sign of welcome. The original court complex included one of the country's only rotary jails. The jail was torn down in 1984 and replaced with a new structure on the same site.

The city was incorporated in 1856, annulled in 1857, reincorporated in 1859, annulled during the Civil War, reincorporated in 1869, disincoporated again in 1869 and finally formally incorporated on July 19, 1869, when the Kansas City, St. Joseph, and Council Bluffs Railroad (later acquired by the Chicago, Burlington and Quincy Railroad) arrived. The Wabash Railroad arrived in 1879. Both railroads no longer operate in the city and no railroads are operated anywhere in Nodaway County.

=== Missouri governors ===
In 1872 Albert P. Morehouse started the Nodaway Democrat, which became the Maryville Daily Forum. Morehouse would become governor. He lived in a house on Vine Street. Coincidentally, the house would later be occupied by Forrest C. Donnell before Donnell became a governor and U.S. Senator. The Forum was a chain-owned newspaper for nearly 100 years, and in 2013 it reverted to local ownership by the Cobb Group.

In 1889 the Maryville Methodist Seminary opened.

In 1891 Elizabeth Howell (who operated Howell Millinery in Maryville) contributed to the development of the Lazy Susan when she received an American patent for "certain new and useful Improvements in Self-Waiting Tables". Howell's device ran more smoothly and did not permit crumbs to fall into the space between the Lazy Susan and the table.

In 1894 Mary Augustine Giesen moved to Maryville and opened St. Francis Hospital.

=== Kentucky Derby connections ===
In 1901, the horse Elwood was foaled at Faustiana Farms, owned by Mrs. J.B. Prather, on the west side of Maryville. It won the Kentucky Derby in 1904 and was the first Derby winner to be bred by a woman. Faustiana was located where the Maryville Country Club is today. Mrs. Prather also has connections with the second horse to be owned and bred by a woman to win the Derby – Black Gold in 1924, which was the great-grandchild of Faustus, the namesake of the Faustiana farm. Elwood and Black Gold are two of 10 Kentucky Derby winners with Nodaway County connections. Trainer Ben A. Jones won the Derby in 1938, 1941, 1944, 1948, 1949 and 1952. His son Jimmy Jones won in 1957 and 1958. They operated a horse farm at Parnell, Missouri until their deaths (although their racing fame is tied to Calumet Farm in Kentucky). Memorabilia from their horse racing days are St. Francis Hospital and at the Nodaway County Historical Society Museum.

=== Northwest Missouri State University founding ===
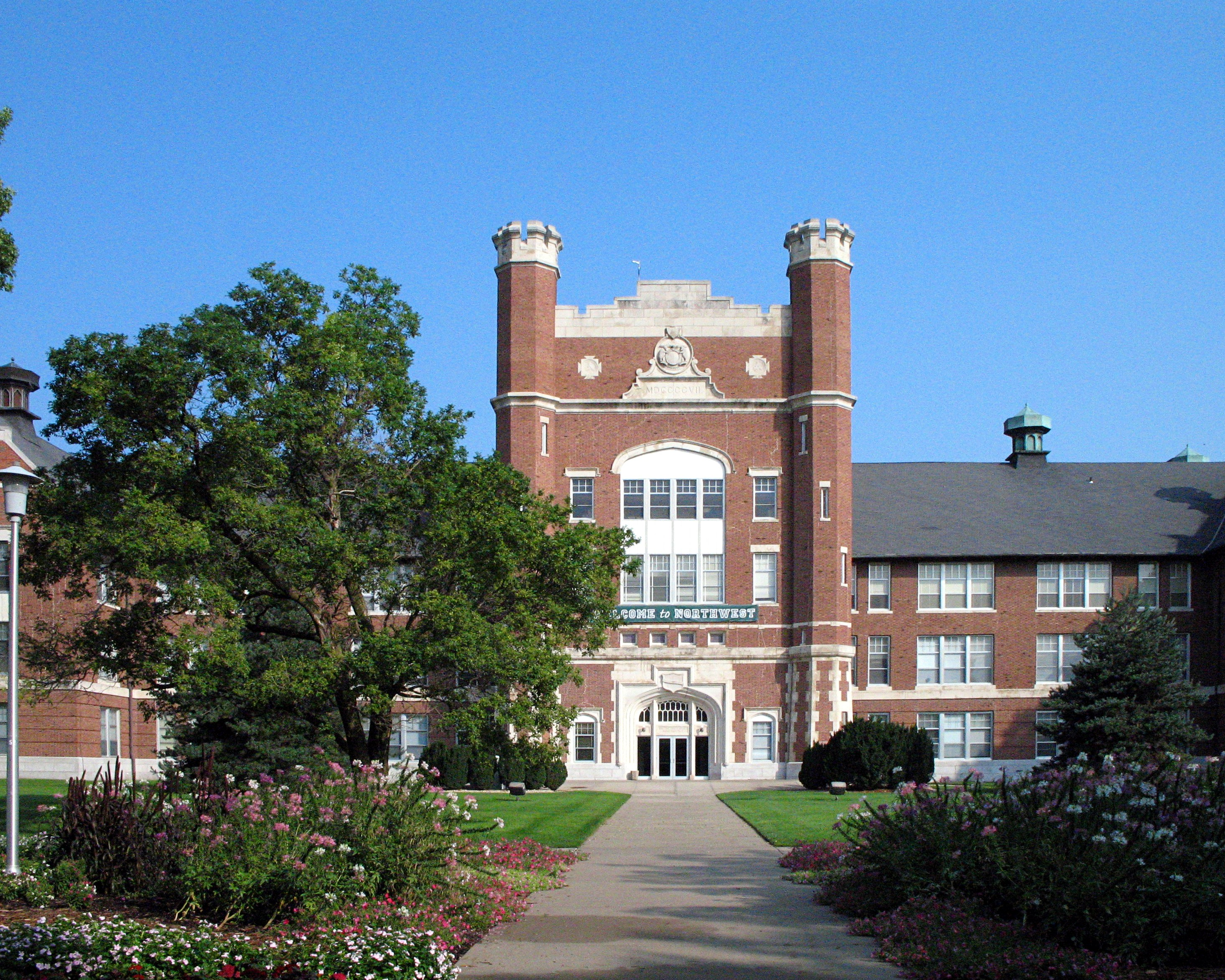
Administration Building on Northwest campus

In 1905, Maryville won a contest to get the Fifth District Normal School, which would become Northwest Missouri State University. It offered $58,672 and 86 acres (35 ha), including the Methodist Seminary, to the state. The college was on the northwest corner of the city, nearly adjoining the Wabash train station. The most significant structure on the land transferred to the state was the Thomas Gaunt mansion, which is also on the National Register and is the college President's residence. Gaunt owned an extensive nursery on his property, which was on a birch-lined street and is now the Missouri Arboretum. The most recognizable building on the campus today is the Administration Building, designed by John H. Felt. It is on the National Register and resembles Brookings Hall at Washington University in St. Louis, which was the Administration Building of the 1904 World's Fair in St. Louis.

=== 1931 lynching ===
In 1931, a notorious lynching occurred in Maryville when a mob of 2,000 to 4,000 people burned alive African American Raymond Gunn, who was awaiting trial, charged with the attempted rape and killing of a 20-year-old white school teacher. One woman held her young girl up so the girl could get a better view of the naked man afire. A Maryville policeman directed traffic as Gunn burned. After the fire was out, hundreds of the mob poked around in his ashes for souvenirs, with the pieces of his charred remains and teeth and bone fragments divided among them. While the Sheriff said he knew who had committed the killing, nobody was ever charged.

The lynching attracted national attention and was frequently invoked in the unsuccessful campaign to pass the Costigan–Wagner Bill, which would have made it a federal crime for law enforcement officials to refuse to try to prevent a lynching.

=== Herbert Hoover connections ===
In 1928 there was speculation that Maryville would become the "Western White House" for Herbert Hoover when it was discovered that he owned a farm 15 miles south of town. The farm was actually only 80 acres and he had acquired it after holding the mortgage for his Stanford University Class of 1895 roommate Samuel Wilson Collins. It was Iowa-native Hoover's only farm and Hoover visited it in 1933 after leaving office. He was accompanied by his former Secretary of Agriculture Arthur M. Hyde. Hoover's vice president Charles Curtis visited Maryville on October 4, 1932, where spoke at the Administration Building after being rained out of a planned appearance at the Courthouse.

=== Harry Truman connections ===
Harry S. Truman (along with Bess and Margaret Truman) made the last of several visits to Maryville on August 3, 1962, when he dedicated the current post office. Truman had extensive ties to Maryville. During World War I Truman was a member of the 129th Field Artillery Regiment in the Missouri National Guard, which is headquartered in Maryville. Truman commanded Battery D in the war of the 129th. The 129th official motto is "Truman's Own" because of the affiliation. During the Meuse-Argonne Offensive during World War I in 1918, Truman prophetically told his troops, ""Right now, I'm where I want to be – in command of this battery. I'd rather be here than president of the United States." Among the original 129th soldiers was Edward V. Condon (1893–1974) who later operated the Condon Corner Drug Store across the street on the Square after the war. Truman dedicated the 129th's armory on the northwest side of Bearcat Stadium on the college campus on February 20, 1955.

The 1955 armory was repurposed as the Jon T. Rickman Electronic Campus Support Center in 2003, when a new armory was built further west of the campus near the Maryville Country Club, which is the site of the original Faustiana Farm complex. Many of Maryville's most active citizens have ties to the 129th, including Leigh Wilson (1881–1978), who rose to rank of Brigadier General. Wilson, who operated the Wilson Motel in Maryville, as well as the Hitching Post restaurant, was one of the biggest proponents for broadening Maryville's economic base away from the college.

Truman's sister Mary Jane Truman, who was active in the Order of Eastern Star, visited Maryville and Nodaway County several times for Eastern Star events before, during and after the Truman presidency.

=== Miscellaneous ===
In 1969, Maryville received an All-America City Award.

In 1987, the Palms Bar in town began sponsoring the "World's Shortest Saint Patrick's Day Parade." The parades, which are less than a block long, have been getting shorter each year as other towns compete for the title. One of the mainstays of events has been a cement truck driving down the street at the beginning, pouring out buckets of green water as a Maryville homage to the dyeing of the Chicago River green. In 2015, the parade moved from being a block off the square to actually being on the square after it became sponsored by Burny's Sports Bar.

In 1994, Mozingo Lake opened east of Maryville. Its Mozingo Lake Golf Course has courses designed by Donald Sechrest and Tom Watson (which opened in 2016).

In 1996, the Maryville Treatment Center, a minimum security prison, opened in a renovated Franciscan Sisters of Mary Motherhouse which had been built in 1947 and has a landmark yellow steeple on the bluffs above the One Hundred and Two River on the east side of Maryville.

=== American football ===
Maryville became a football powerhouse in 1994 when Mel Tjeerdsma became coach of Northwest Missouri State Bearcats football. The Bearcats played in the 1998, 1999, 2005, 2006, 2007, 2008, 2009, 2013, 2015 and 2016 NCAA Division II Football Championship games, winning in 1998, 1999, 2009, 2013, 2015 and 2016. The basketball team won national titles in the NCAA Division II Basketball Championship in 2017, 2019 and 2021. In addition, the Maryville High School football team appeared in 1996, 2008, 2009, 2012, 2013, 2016 and 2017 (winning in 2009, 2012, 2013 and 2017, in addition to an earlier championship in 1982) state championship games. The history of championship victories have earned the town nickname of "Title Town." The high school has the unique mascot of "Spoofhounds." Both schools have green and white for their school colors. Adam Dorrel, a Maryville High graduate, succeeded his former boss Tjeerdsma when he retired as coach in 2010 and kept up the tradition winning the national titles in 2013, 2015 and 2016.

=== Minor league baseball ===
Maryville was home to the Maryville Comets, a minor league baseball team, in 1910 and 1911. The Comets played as members of the Class D level Missouri-Iowa-Nebraska-Kansas League.

=== 2012 sexual assault ===
A controversial case arose in 2012 when a boy, 17 at the time of the incident, was arrested for the rape and sexual assault of a 14-year-old girl. A 15-year-old boy was accused of doing the same to the girl's 13-year-old friend, and a third boy admitted to recording the first boy's alleged assault on a cellphone. A significant controversy arose in 2013 when the county prosecutor dropped felony and misdemeanor charges against the first boy, who was related to an influential former state representative Rex Barnett, despite the Sheriff's office reporting absolute confidence that the evidence they had gathered being sufficient for a prosecution, including the boy's confession recorded on video. The Nodaway County prosecutor dropped the felony sexual exploitation charge against the third boy.

Outrage in online communities soon followed when the story surrounding this case was revisited in October 2013. National news media described the situation as "horrifying" and "a nightmare". Michael Schaffer, reporting on the incident for The New Republic, described Maryville as a "lawless hellhole". In 2014, a special prosecutor was put in charge to reinvestigate the case. The first boy pleaded guilty to misdemeanor second-degree endangerment of the welfare of a child for leaving her outside her house, and was sentenced by Missouri Circuit Judge Glen Dietrich to four months in jail that were suspended in favor of two years probation. The boy was sentenced in juvenile court for the assault. The incident is featured in the 2016 Netflix documentary Audrie & Daisy.

The victim, Daisy Coleman, died by suicide on August 4, 2020. Coleman's mother, Melinda Coleman, died by suicide about four months later, on December 6.

== Geography ==
Maryville is located approximately 40 miles (64 km) north of the St. Joseph and 25 miles (40 km) southwest of Bedford, Iowa.

According to the United States Census Bureau, the city has a total area of 5.80 square miles (15.02 km^{2}), of which 5.77 square miles (14.94 km^{2}) is land and 0.03 square miles (0.08 km^{2}) is water.

== Climate ==
Situated in a transitional climate area, Maryville has a humid continental climate (Köppen climate classification Dfa) with hot, humid summers combined with unusually cold winters by Missouri standards. Although prone to hard freezes, Maryville's coldest month of January still retains average highs above the freezing point. The large diurnal temperature variations plunge average lows into the mid-teens, with around 141 air frosts per year on average.

Climate data for Maryville, Missouri (1991–2020 normals, extremes 1895–present)
Month	Jan	Feb	Mar	Apr	May	Jun	Jul	Aug	Sep	Oct	Nov	Dec	Year
Record high °F (°C)	69 (21)	80 (27)	92 (33)	96 (36)	110 (43)	105 (41)	112 (44)	113 (45)	107 (42)	99 (37)	84 (29)	71 (22)	113 (45)
Mean maximum °F (°C)	56.5 (13.6)	62.0 (16.7)	75.6 (24.2)	84.7 (29.3)	89.6 (32.0)	94.0 (34.4)	96.3 (35.7)	95.7 (35.4)	91.9 (33.3)	85.9 (29.9)	71.7 (22.1)	60.6 (15.9)	98.0 (36.7)
Mean daily maximum °F (°C)	33.8 (1.0)	38.9 (3.8)	51.5 (10.8)	63.2 (17.3)	73.3 (22.9)	83.0 (28.3)	86.7 (30.4)	85.2 (29.6)	78.4 (25.8)	66.1 (18.9)	50.7 (10.4)	38.5 (3.6)	62.4 (16.9)
Daily mean °F (°C)	23.8 (−4.6)	28.4 (−2.0)	40.2 (4.6)	51.2 (10.7)	62.4 (16.9)	72.3 (22.4)	76.1 (24.5)	74.0 (23.3)	66.0 (18.9)	53.7 (12.1)	40.0 (4.4)	28.8 (−1.8)	51.4 (10.8)
Mean daily minimum °F (°C)	13.9 (−10.1)	17.9 (−7.8)	28.9 (−1.7)	39.2 (4.0)	51.5 (10.8)	61.6 (16.4)	65.6 (18.7)	62.9 (17.2)	53.7 (12.1)	41.3 (5.2)	29.2 (−1.6)	19.2 (−7.1)	40.4 (4.7)
Mean minimum °F (°C)	−8.1 (−22.3)	−1.7 (−18.7)	9.4 (−12.6)	24.6 (−4.1)	38.1 (3.4)	50.0 (10.0)	55.8 (13.2)	53.0 (11.7)	39.2 (4.0)	25.9 (−3.4)	13.2 (−10.4)	−0.8 (−18.2)	−12.6 (−24.8)
Record low °F (°C)	−32 (−36)	−28 (−33)	−26 (−32)	4 (−16)	18 (−8)	38 (3)	42 (6)	39 (4)	22 (−6)	2 (−17)	−11 (−24)	−28 (−33)	−32 (−36)
Average precipitation inches (mm)	0.89 (23)	1.20 (30)	2.31 (59)	3.98 (101)	5.47 (139)	4.97 (126)	5.33 (135)	4.22 (107)	3.52 (89)	3.01 (76)	1.98 (50)	1.49 (38)	38.37 (975)
Average snowfall inches (cm)	5.2 (13)	4.4 (11)	1.6 (4.1)	0.8 (2.0)	0.0 (0.0)	0.0 (0.0)	0.0 (0.0)	0.0 (0.0)	0.0 (0.0)	0.1 (0.25)	0.6 (1.5)	2.6 (6.6)	15.3 (39)
Average precipitation days (≥ 0.01 in)	5.5	6.1	7.5	10.0	12.2	11.0	9.5	8.7	7.5	8.0	5.9	5.3	97.2
Average snowy days (≥ 0.1 in)	2.7	2.3	1.0	0.2	0.0	0.0	0.0	0.0	0.0	0.1	0.7	2.4	9.4
Source: NOAA

== Demographics ==
Historical population
Census	Pop.	Note	%±
1860	427		—
1870	1,682		293.9%
1880	3,485		107.2%
1890	4,037		15.8%
1900	4,577		13.4%
1910	4,762		4.0%
1920	4,711		−1.1%
1930	5,217		10.7%
1940	5,700		9.3%
1950	6,834		19.9%
1960	7,807		14.2%
1970	9,970		27.7%
1980	9,558		−4.1%
1990	10,663		11.6%
2000	10,581		−0.8%
2010	11,972		13.1%
2020	10,633		−11.2%
U.S. Decennial Census

=== 2020 census ===
As of the 2020 census, Maryville had a population of 10,633, including 4,314 households and 2,029 families. The population density was 1,669.2 per square mile (644.0/km^{2}).

The median age was 25.7 years. 16.9% of residents were under the age of 18 and 15.4% of residents were 65 years of age or older. For every 100 females there were 87.2 males, and for every 100 females age 18 and over there were 84.7 males age 18 and over. 99.6% of residents lived in urban areas, while 0.4% lived in rural areas.

There were 4,868 housing units, of which 11.4% were vacant. The homeowner vacancy rate was 1.1% and the rental vacancy rate was 9.8%. Of all households, 21.9% had children under the age of 18 living in them, 32.8% were married-couple households, 24.7% were households with a male householder and no spouse or partner present, and 35.0% were households with a female householder and no spouse or partner present. About 37.8% of all households were made up of individuals and 12.7% had someone living alone who was 65 years of age or older.

Racial composition as of the 2020 census
Race	Number	Percent
White	9,464	89.0%
Black or African American	240	2.3%
American Indian and Alaska Native	23	0.2%
Asian	349	3.3%
Native Hawaiian and Other Pacific Islander	1	0.0%
Some other race	93	0.9%
Two or more races	463	4.4%
Hispanic or Latino (of any race)	294	2.8%

=== Income and poverty ===
The 2016–2020 5-year American Community Survey estimates show that the median household income was $40,112 (with a margin of error of +/- $6,163) and the median family income was $61,875 (+/- $8,406). Males had a median income of $19,020 (+/- $4,700) versus $10,715 (+/- $2,151) for females. The median income for those above 16 years old was $12,645 (+/- $2,891). Approximately, 14.3% of families and 29.8% of the population were below the poverty line, including 22.7% of those under the age of 18 and 8.0% of those ages 65 or over.

=== 2010 census ===
As of the census of 2010, there were 11,972 people, 4,217 households, and 1,865 families residing in the city. The population density was 2,074.9 inhabitants per square mile (801.1/km^{2}). There were 4,543 housing units at an average density of 787.3 per square mile (304.0/km^{2}). The racial makeup of the city was 92.3% White, 3.1% African American, 0.2% Native American, 2.7% Asian, 0.4% from other races, and 1.2% from two or more races. Hispanic or Latino of any race were 1.6% of the population.

There were 4,217 households, of which 20.4% had children under the age of 18 living with them, 33.7% were married couples living together, 7.6% had a female householder with no husband present, 2.9% had a male householder with no wife present, and 55.8% were non-families. 35.5% of all households were made up of individuals, and 11.8% had someone living alone who was 65 years of age or older. The average household size was 2.16 and the average family size was 2.82.

The median age in the city was 22.7 years. 13.8% of residents were under the age of 18; 43.6% were between the ages of 18 and 24; 16.3% were from 25 to 44; 14.8% were from 45 to 64; and 11.4% were 65 years of age or older. The gender makeup of the city was 47.9% male and 52.1% female.

=== 2000 census ===
As of the census of 2000, there were 10,581 people, 3,913 households, and 1,835 families residing in the city. The population density was 2,102.8 inhabitants per square mile (811.9/km^{2}). There were 4,227 housing units at an average density of 840.0 per square mile (324.3/km^{2}). The racial makeup of the city was 95.78% White, 1.48% African American, 0.18% Native American, 1.46% Asian, 0.02% Pacific Islander, 0.31% from other races, and 0.77% from two or more races. Hispanic or Latino of any race were 0.98% of the population.

There were 3,913 households, out of which 20.8% had children under the age of 18 living with them, 37.4% were married couples living together, 7.2% had a female householder with no husband present, and 53.1% were non-families. 35.3% of all households were made up of individuals, and 11.2% had someone living alone who was 65 years of age or older. The average household size was 2.16 and the average family size was 2.83.

In the city the population was spread out, with 14.0% under the age of 18, 41.4% from 18 to 24, 17.3% from 25 to 44, 14.8% from 45 to 64, and 12.5% who were 65 years of age or older. The mean age was 23 years. For every 100 females, there were 87.1 males. For every 100 females age 18 and over, there were 83.6 males.

The mean income for a household in the city was $29,043, and the mean income for a family was $43,906. Males had a mean income of $30,444 versus $22,444 for females. The per capita income for the city was $15,483. About 10.3% of families and 23.6% of the population were below the poverty line, including 12.3% of those under age 18 and 14.2% of those age 65 or over.

== Points of interest ==
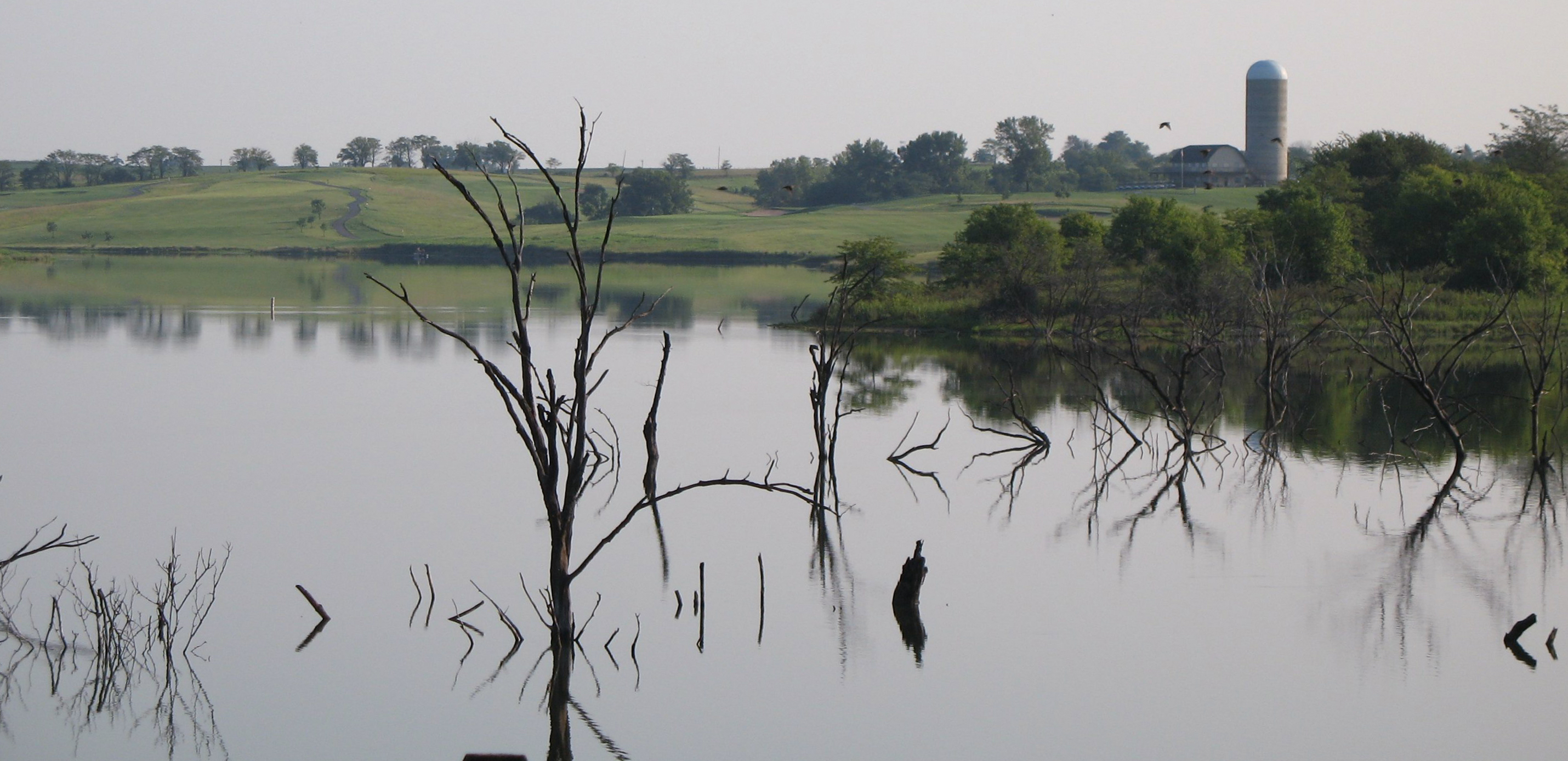
Mozingo Lake Golf Course, 2006

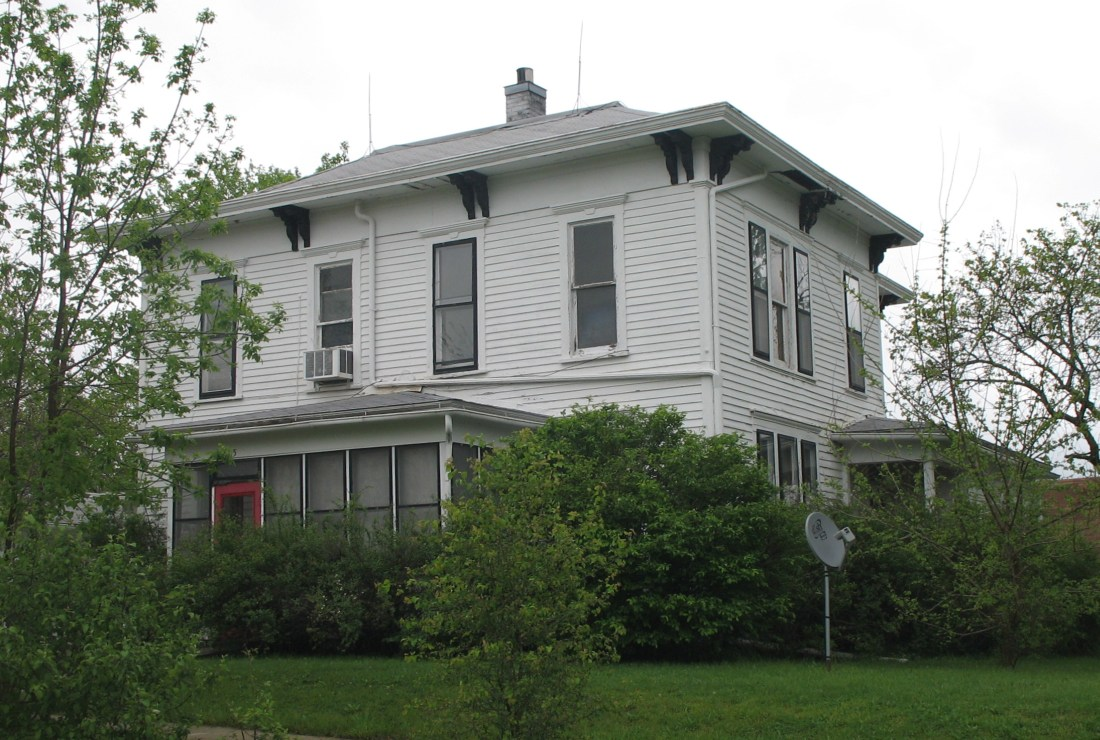
Mansion on South Vine Street where both Missouri governors from Maryville, (Albert P. Morehouse and Forrest C. Donnell), coincidentally lived, 2007

- Missouri Academy of Science, Mathematics and Computing
- Missouri State Arboretum
- Mozingo Lake Park and Golf Course
- Nodaway County Historical Society Museum
- Northwest Missouri State University
- Maryville Treatment Center
- Kawasaki Heavy Industries Motorcycle & Engine has an assembly plant for utility engines in town.

The Administration Building, Caleb Burns House, Frank House, Thomas Gaunt House, and Nodaway County Courthouse are listed on the National Register of Historic Places.

== Recreation ==
Maryville has ten city parks, which includes six baseball fields, several soccer and football fields, a skate park, a nature park, and the Maryville Aquatic Center. The city also maintains the Mozingo Lake Park and Golf Course. The golf course consists of 27 holes and is situated nearby the lake.

== Government ==
The city of Maryville is governed by a city council consisting of five members who are elected at-large and serve terms of three years. There is no limit to the number of terms that one can serve on the council. Each year, one of the council members is selected to serve as the mayor of the city and another as the mayor pro tem.

== Education ==
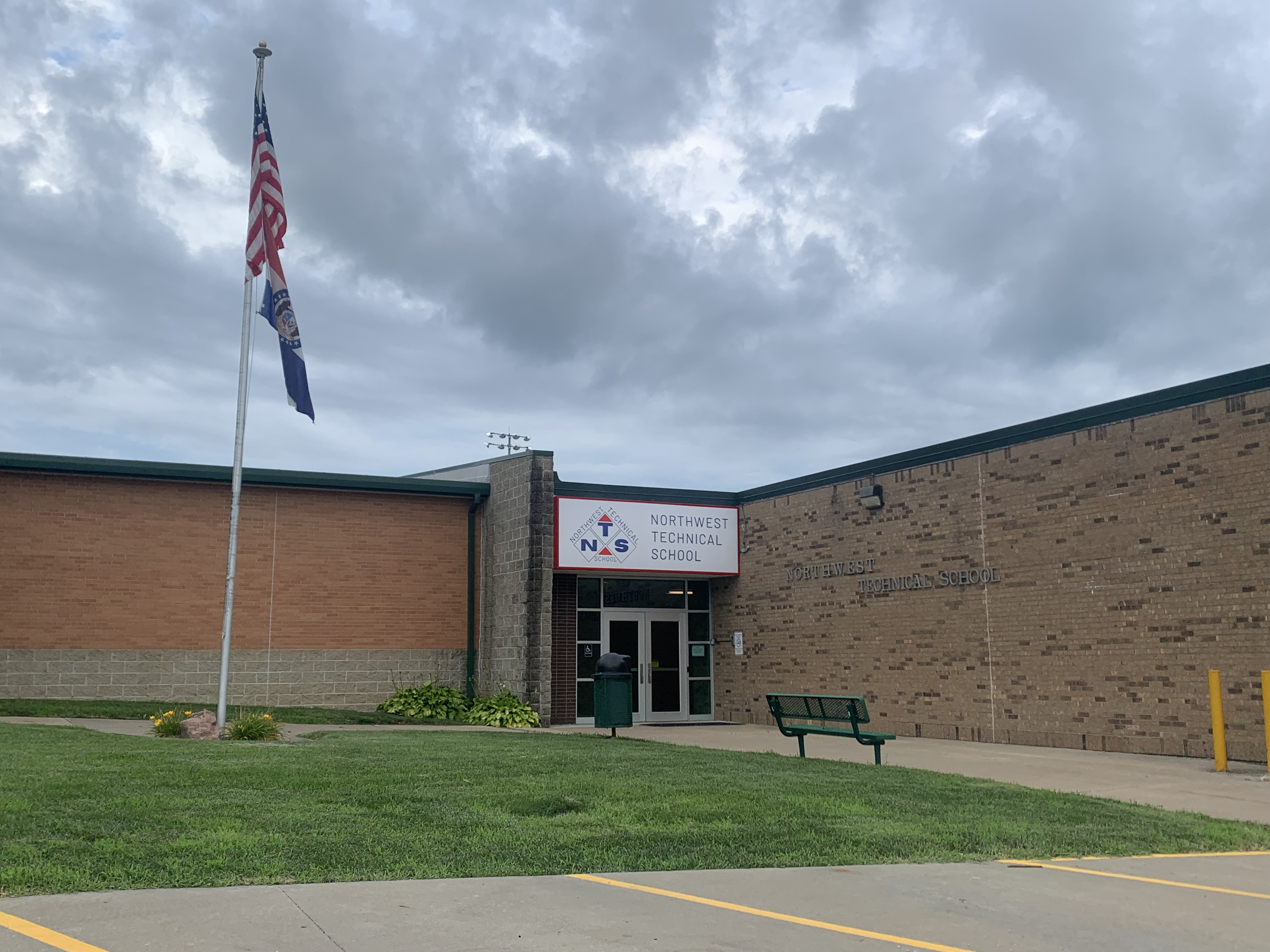
Northwest Technical School in Maryville, Missouri

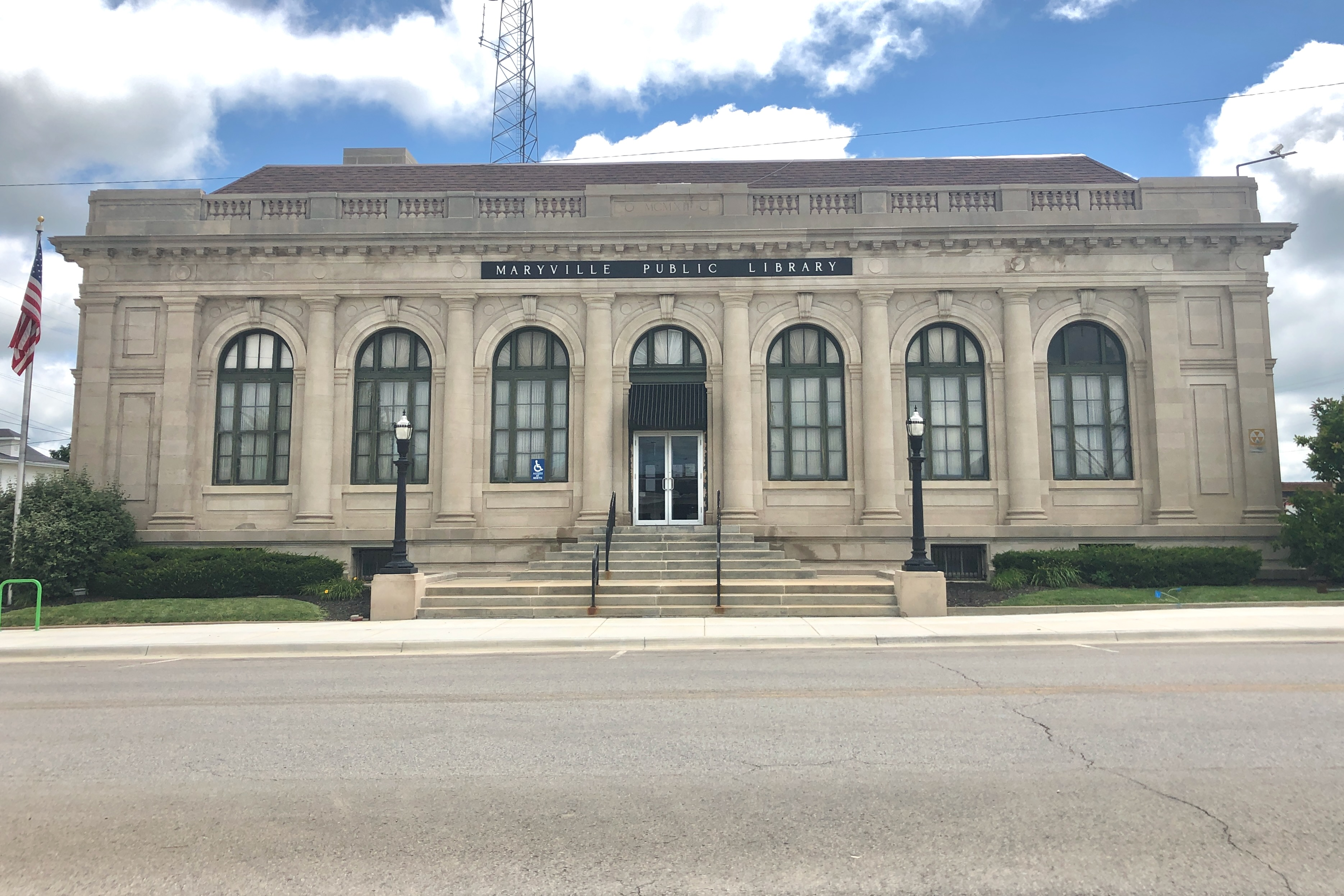
Maryville Public Library, formerly the Maryville Post Office building

=== Primary and secondary education ===
The Maryville R-II School District contains 3 separate buildings:

- Maryville High School (Grades 9–12)
- Maryville Middle School (Grades 5–8)
- Eugene Field Elementary School (Grades Pre-K-4)

Maryville is also served by

- St. Gregory's Barbarigo School (Grades K-8)
- Horace Mann Laboratory School (Grades Pre-K-6)

=== Colleges ===
- Northwest Missouri State University
- Satellite campus of North Central Missouri College located at the Northwest Technical Center

=== Public library ===
Maryville has a lending library, the Maryville Public Library.

== Media ==
=== Radio ===
Five licensed broadcast stations in the town are:

- KNIM – 1580 AM – Oldies and Regional News
- KZLX-LP – 106.7 FM – NWMSU Student Radio Station
- KVVL – 97.1 FM – Oldies, Classic rock, and Regional Sports
- KNIM 95.9 Pickup Country
- KXCV – 90.5 FM – NWMSU University Radio Station: Classical/Jazz, National Public Radio, and Bearcat Radio Network (NWMSU Sports) Flagship Station
- KBCT – 104.9 FM – Classic Hits

== Infrastructure ==
=== Transportation ===
There are two U.S. Highways in Maryville: U.S. Routes 71 and 136 intersect on the eastern side of the city. A branch of US 71, U.S. Route 71 Business, serves as the main street for the city. Route 46, Route 148, and Route V also provide access outside the city. In 2002, the principal highway through Maryville, U.S. 71, was converted to a four-lane route from Savannah and a bypass was built along the east side of Maryville. Route 71 is at least a four-lane and some cases an interstate highway for the entire length of Missouri, from the Arkansas border and there had been considerable delays in converting the last remaining two-lane section from Savannah to Maryville. US 71 north of Maryville to the Iowa border is the only remaining two-lane portion of Route 71 in Missouri.

Maryville is served by the Northwest Missouri Regional Airport, which is a general aviation airport with no commercial service.

Intercity bus service to the city is provided by Jefferson Lines.

=== Health care ===
Maryville is home to Mosaic Medical Center – Maryville (previously known as St. Francis Hospital and Health Services).

== Notable people ==
- Sarah Caldwell, Boston opera diva
- Dale Carnegie, author of How to Win Friends and Influence People
- Homer Croy, author and screenwriter who wrote about life in Maryville
- Albert David, Medal of Honor recipient for capture of U-505 during World War II
- Forrest C. Donnell, Missouri Governor
- Adam Dorrel, 3x National Champion winning coach, 4x MIAA champion coach, and 3x AFCA NCAA DII Coach of the Year
- Raymond Gunn, a black man burned to death by a mob of townsfolk in 1931
- Jane Hall Johnson, engineer and architect
- Horace A. "Jimmy" Jones, horse trainer
- Darius Kinsey, photographer of logging industry
- Truman H. Landon, Air Force General
- Edward H. Moore, U.S. Senator in Oklahoma
- Albert P. Morehouse, Missouri Governor
- Lynne Overman, actor sidekick from the 1930s and 1940s
- Jim Spainhower, State Treasurer
- George S.E. Vaughn, accused Confederate spy who claimed to have been pardoned by Abraham Lincoln an hour before the President's assassination
- Jalen Sundell, NFL offensive lineman, Super Bowl LX champion

== See also ==
- Elwood, Kentucky Derby winner born at Faustiana Farms
- One Hundred and Two River
- Audrie & Daisy
- List of cities in Missouri
