= Thomas Gaunt House =

Historic house in Missouri, United States

- U.S. National Register of Historic Places
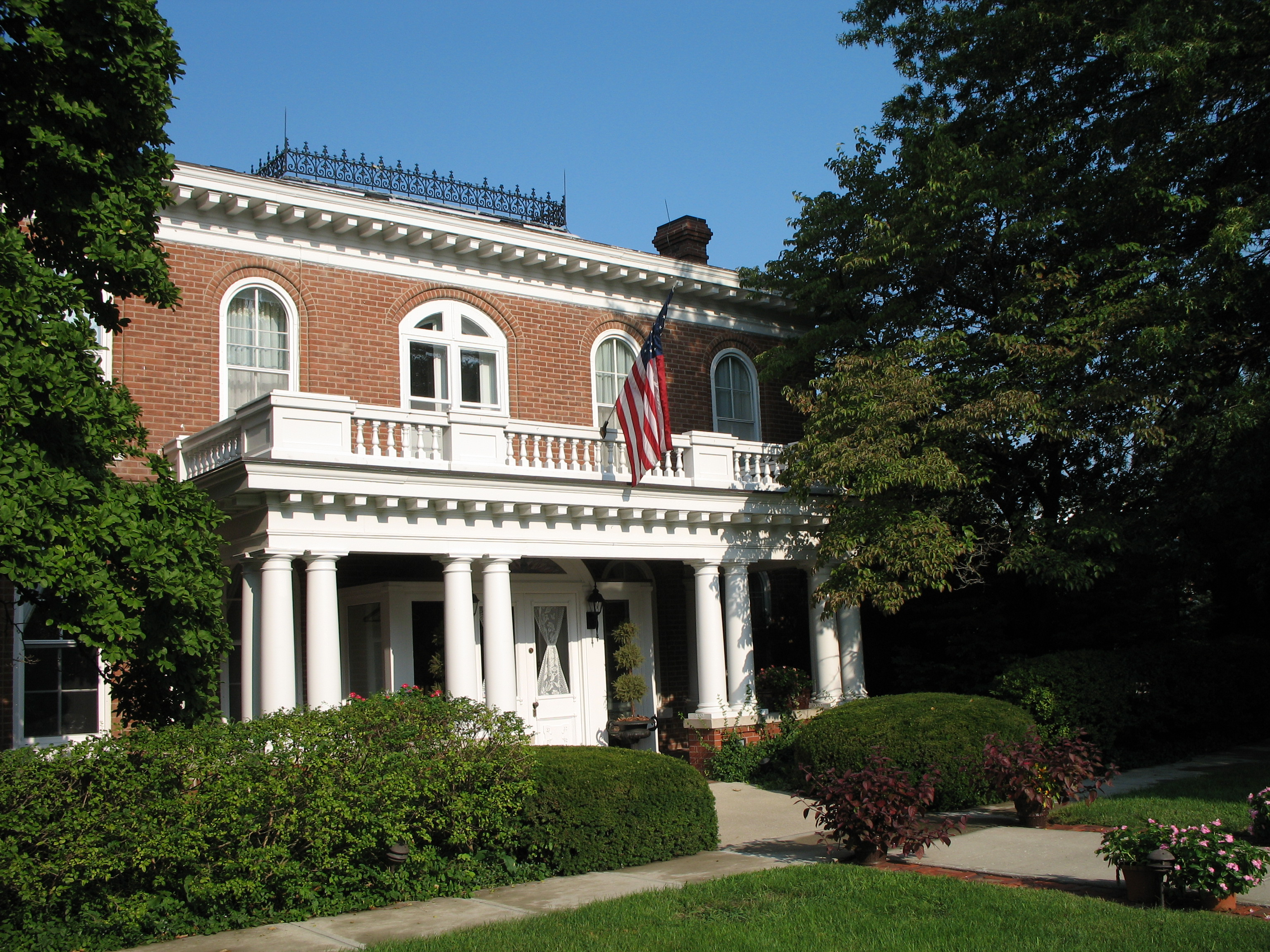
- Thomas Gaunt House, April 2006

- Location within Missouri Location within the United States
- Location: 703 College Ave., Maryville, Missouri
- Coordinates: 40°21′0″N 94°52′55″W
- Area: 1.5 acres (0.61 ha)
- Built: c. 1865
- Architect: Castillo, Joseph
- Architectural style: late Greek Revival
- NRHP reference No.: 79001385
- Added to NRHP: April 19, 1979

Thomas Gaunt House, also known as The President's Home, is a historic home located at Maryville, Nodaway County, Missouri. It was built about 1865, and is a two-story, modified "L"-plan, brick dwelling in the late Greek Revival style. It has a shallow pitched hipped roof with a broad cornice. It features Neoclassical porches supported by grouped Tuscan order columns. It is owned by Northwest Missouri State University, and is occupied by the president of the university.

It was listed on the National Register of Historic Places in 1979.
