= Frank House (Maryville, Missouri) =

Historic house in Missouri, United States

- U.S. National Register of Historic Places
- Location within Missouri Location within the United States
- Location: 307 E. 7th St., Maryville, Missouri
- Coordinates: 40°21′12″N 94°51′4″W
- Area: 1.5 acres (0.61 ha)
- Built: 1880
- Architectural style: Italianate
- NRHP reference No.: 83001032
- Added to NRHP: September 8, 1983

Frank House, also known as The Newby House, is a historic home located at Maryville, Nodaway County, Missouri. It was built about 1890, and is a two-story, Italianate style asymmetrical frame dwelling. It measures approximately 45 feet long and 38 feet wide. It features a full-width front porch with carpenter trim columns and decorative scrollwork on the gable ends. Also on the property is a contributing outbuilding.

It was listed on the National Register of Historic Places in 1983.
