= Mozingo =

Mozingo may refer to:

- Brecken Mozingo (born 2001), American soccer player
- Edward Mozingo (fl. 1642–1711), one of the first Africans in Virginia
- Mozingo Creek, stream in Missouri
- Mozingo Lake, lake in Missouri
- Mozingo reduction, chemical reaction
