= White Cloud =

White Cloud may refer to:

== People ==
- Buck Jones (American football), also called "White Cloud", a Seneca Native American football player active in 1922
- Mahaska (Native American leader) (1784–1843), also known as White Cloud I, Iowa chief
- Wabanquot (Chippewa chief) (translated as "White Cloud"), an Ojibwa chief
- Wabokieshiek (translated as "White Cloud"), 19th-century Ho-Chunk chief from Illinois
- James White Cloud (1840–1940), also known as Chief White Cloud, Iowa chief from Kansas
- Francis White Cloud, also called White Cloud II, principal chief of the Iowa, son of Mahaska
- Zach Whitecloud (born 1996), Canadian ice hockey player

== Places ==
=== United States ===
- White Cloud, Indiana, in Harrison County
- White Cloud, Kansas, in Doniphan County
- White Cloud, Michigan, in Newaygo County
- White Cloud, Missouri, an unincorporated community in Hickory County
- Whitecloud, Nodaway County, Missouri, an unincorporated community
- White Cloud Creek, a stream in the U.S. state of Missouri
- White Cloud Township (disambiguation), two different places

== Other uses ==
- Mahpiya Ska, a sacred albino female White Buffalo living in Jamestown, North Dakota
- White Cloud Mountain minnow, a type of fish commonly kept in cold-water aquariums
- White Cloud, a series of Naval Ocean Surveillance System military satellites
- White Cloud toilet paper
- White Cloud, a record label founded by Jon Mark

== See also ==
- Aotearoa
- Japanese destroyer Shirakumo
