= West Fork One Hundred and Two River =

Stream in Iowa and Missouri, U.S.

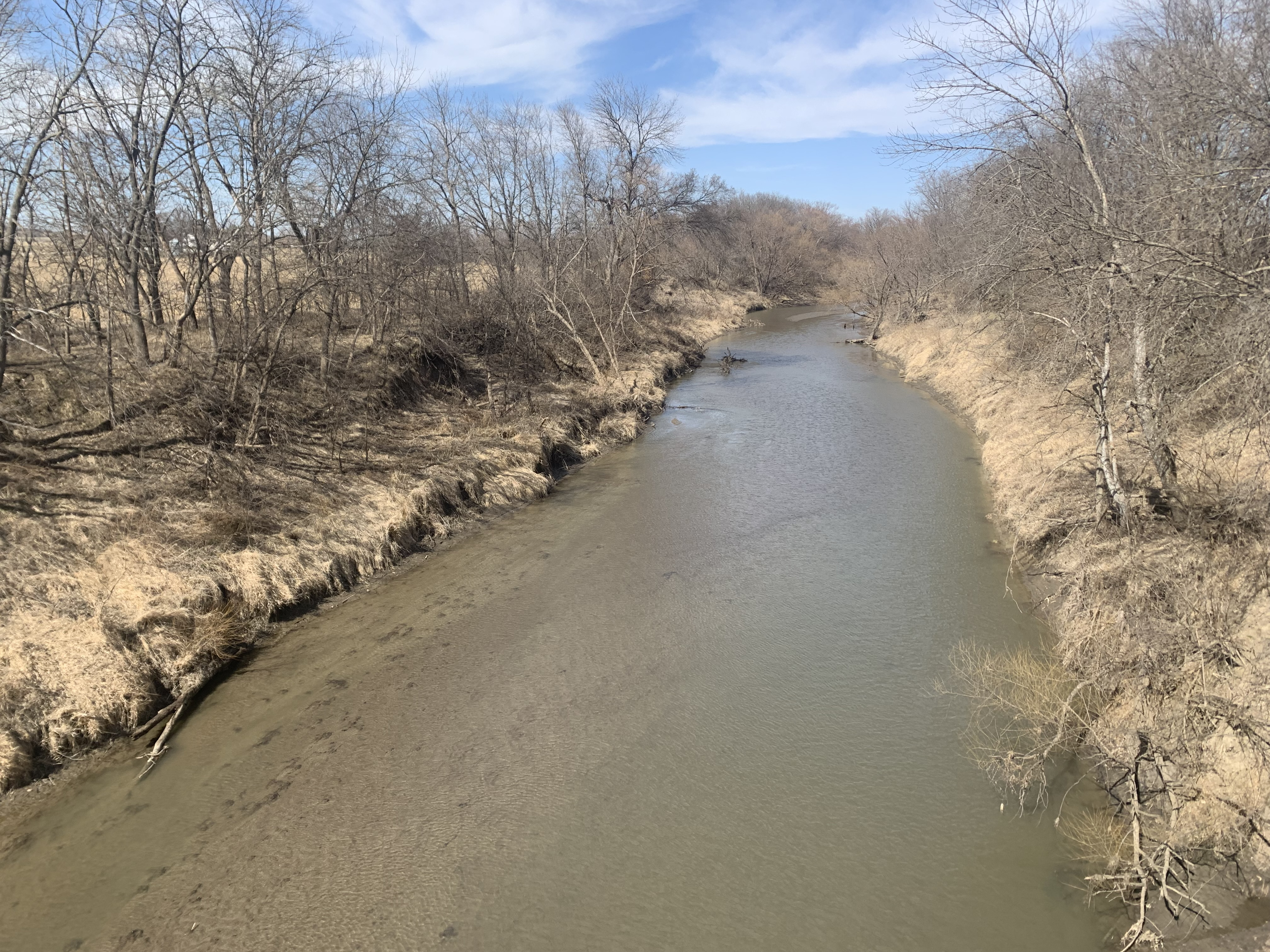
- West 102 River at Missouri Route JJ west of Hopkins, Missouri

Location
- Country: United States
- State: Iowa and Missouri
- County: Adams County, Iowa, Taylor County, Iowa, and Nodaway County, Missouri

Physical characteristics
- Source
  - location: Prescott Township, Adams County
  - coordinates: 40°59′22″N 94°39′51″W
  - elevation: 1,250 ft (380 m)
- Mouth: One Hundred and Two River
  - location: Hopkins Township, Nodaway County
  - coordinates: 40°32′15″N 94°50′47″W
  - elevation: 1,004 ft (306 m)
- Length: 40.8 mi (65.7 km)

Basin features
- Progression: West Fork One Hundred and Two River → One Hundred and Two River → Platte River → Missouri River → Mississippi River → Atlantic Ocean

West Fork One Hundred and Two River is a stream in the U.S. states of Iowa and Missouri. It is a tributary of the One Hundred and Two River and is 40.8 miles (65.7 km) long, which makes it its longest tributary.

The West Fork One Hundred and Two River rises a few miles east of Corning in Adams County, Iowa and travels southwesterly in a course towards the county line with Taylor County, Iowa. Then it begins to travel more southerly and joins with its largest tributary, West Branch, two miles southeast of New Market. Continuing south, the river travels towards Missouri and combines with the Middle Fork One Hundred and Two River a few miles into Missouri west of Hopkins.

There are 5 named tributaries of the West Fork One Hundred and Two River: West Branch, Middle Branch, Lonzo Creek, Willow Creek, and Rose Branch.

== See also ==
- Tributaries of the One Hundred and Two River
- List of rivers of Missouri
- List of rivers of Iowa
