= Middle Fork One Hundred and Two River =

Stream in Iowa and Missouri, U.S.

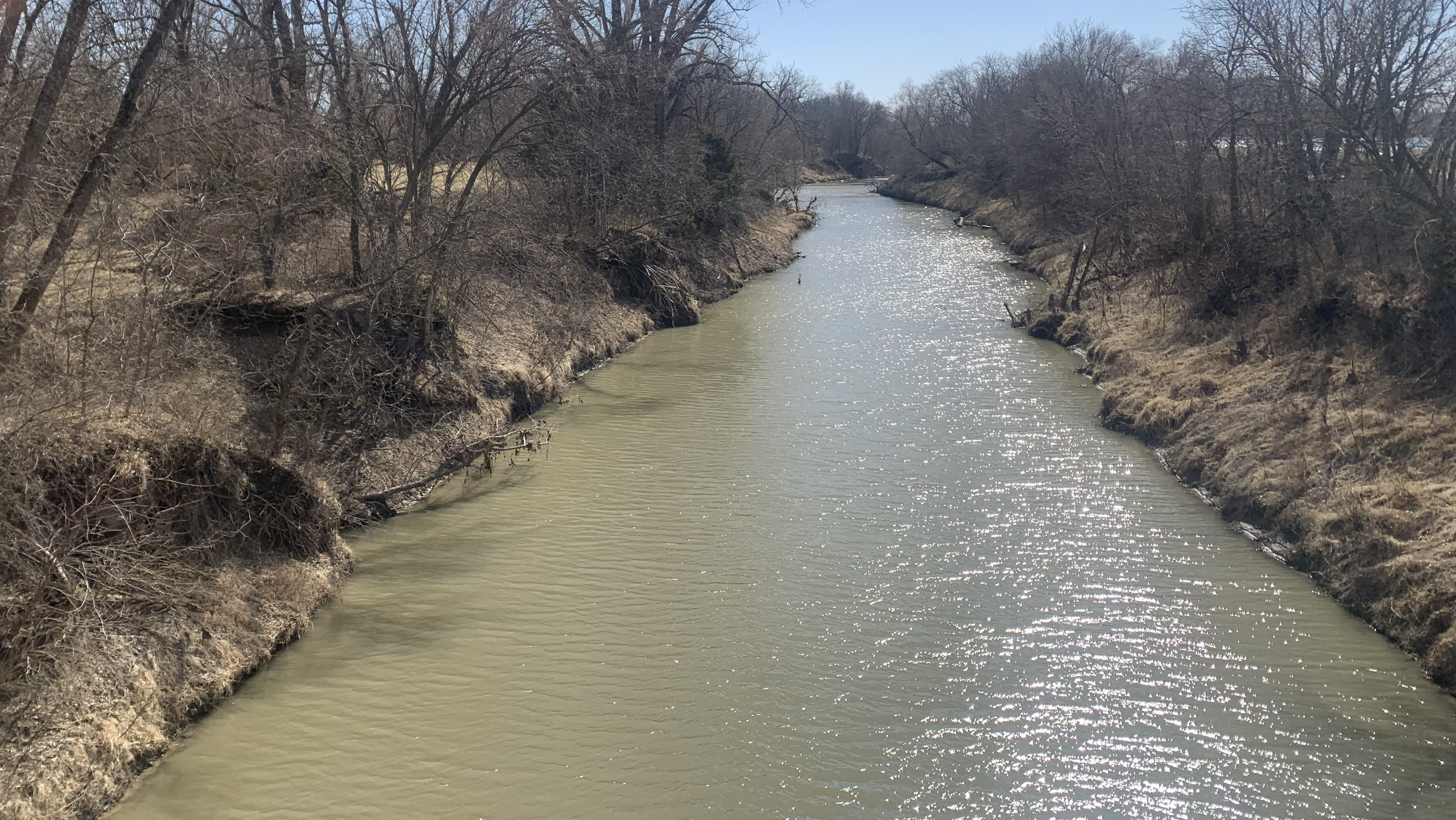
- Middle 102 River at Missouri Route JJ just west of Hopkins, Missouri

Location
- Country: United States
- State: Iowa and Missouri
- County: Taylor County, Iowa and Nodaway County, Missouri

Physical characteristics
- Source
  - location: Grove Township, Taylor County
  - coordinates: 40°49′06″N 94°37′50″W
  - elevation: 1,250 ft (380 m)
- Mouth: One Hundred and Two River
  - location: Hopkins Township, Nodaway County
  - coordinates: 40°33′28″N 94°49′26″W
  - elevation: 1,017 ft (310 m)
- Length: 27.9 mi (44.9 km)

Basin features
- Progression: Middle Fork One Hundred and Two River → One Hundred and Two River → Platte River → Missouri River → Mississippi River → Atlantic Ocean

Middle Fork One Hundred and Two River is a stream in Taylor County, Iowa and Nodaway County, Missouri in the United States. It is a tributary of the One Hundred and Two River and is 27.9 miles (44.9 km) long.

The Middle Fork One Hundred and Two River begins about two miles north of Sharpsburg in Taylor County, Iowa and flows generally southwest. It passes Gravity to the southeast, then travels south-southwest where it is joined with the East Fork One Hundred and Two River just north of Hopkins, Missouri.

There is one named tributary of the Middle Fork One Hundred and Two River, Brushy Creek.

== See also ==
- Tributaries of the One Hundred and Two River
- List of rivers of Iowa
- List of rivers of Missouri
