= East Fork One Hundred and Two River =

Stream in Iowa and Missouri, U.S.

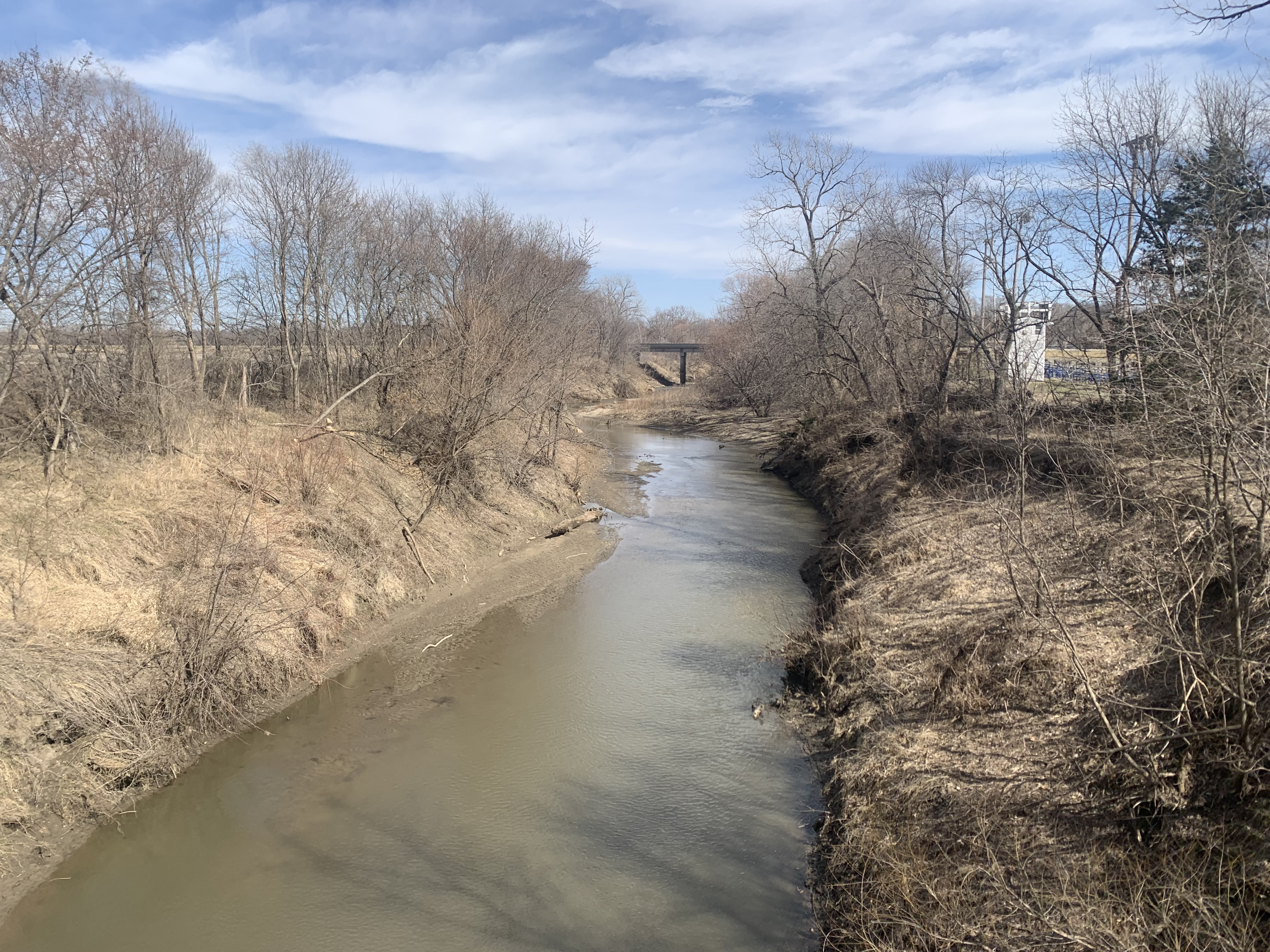
- East 102 River at Hopkins Park road just north of Hopkins, Missouri

Location
- Country: United States
- State: Iowa and Missouri
- County: Taylor County, Iowa and Nodaway County, Missouri

Physical characteristics
- Source
  - location: Platte Township, Taylor County
  - coordinates: 40°52′10″N 94°32′53″W
  - elevation: 1,250 ft (380 m)
- Mouth: One Hundred and Two River
  - location: Hopkins Township, Nodaway County
  - coordinates: 40°33′28″N 94°49′26″W
  - elevation: 1,017 ft (310 m)
- Length: 31.0 mi (49.9 km)
- Discharge
  - location: Bedford, Iowa
  - average: 64.1 cu ft/s (1.82 m^{3}/s)

Basin features
- Progression: East Fork One Hundred and Two River → One Hundred and Two River → Platte River → Missouri River → Mississippi River → Atlantic Ocean

East Fork One Hundred and Two River is a stream in Taylor County, Iowa and Nodaway County, Missouri in the United States. It is a tributary of the One Hundred and Two River and is 31.0 miles (49.9 km) long. The stream is monitored at Bedford, Iowa, by the NOAA.

The East Fork One Hundred and Two River rises just southeast of Lenox in Taylor County, Iowa. It flows southwesterly passed Shaprsburg to the east then Conway to the west, before arriving at Bedford, Iowa, the largest town on its path. From there, it travels alongside Iowa 148 southwest to the Missouri border where it empties into the Middle Fork One Hundred and Two River just northwest of Hopkins, Missouri.

There are four named tributaries of the East Fork One Hundred and Two River: Daugherty Creek, Ash Branch, Hog Branch, and East River.

== See also ==
- Tributaries of the One Hundred and Two River
- List of rivers of Missouri
- List of rivers of Iowa
