= White Cloud Township, Nodaway County, Missouri =

Township in Nodaway County, Missouri, U.S.

White Cloud Township
- Township
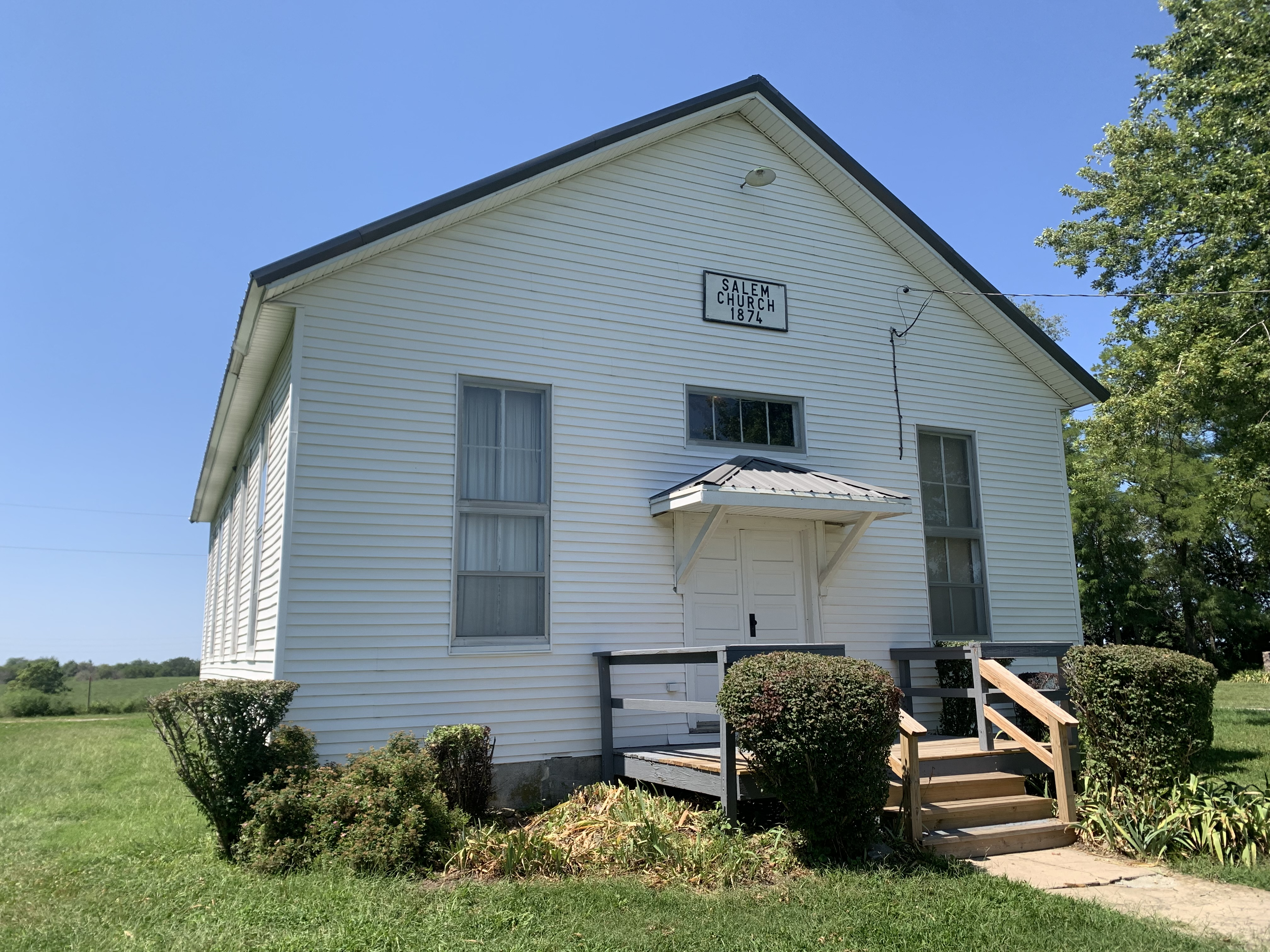
- Salem Church in White Cloud Township

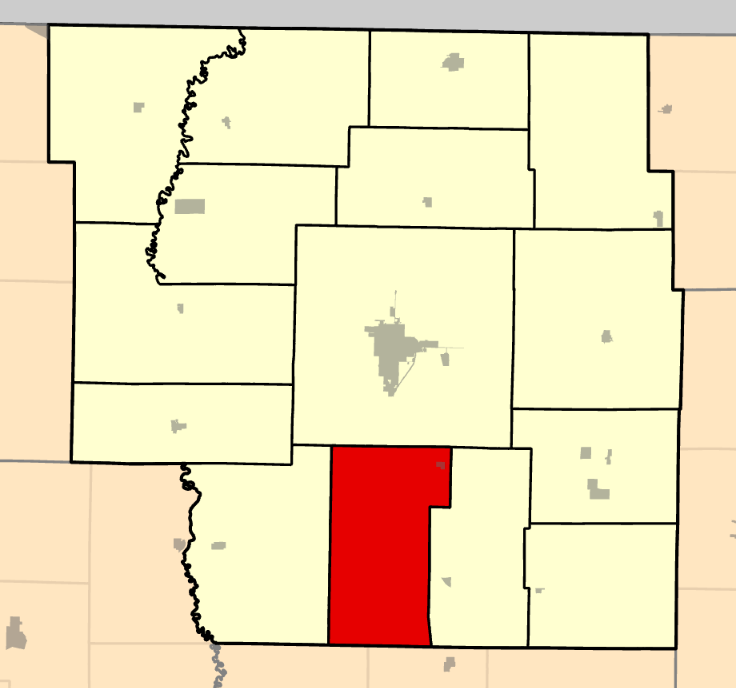
- Coordinates: 40°12′15″N 94°52′39″W
- Country: United States
- State: Missouri
- County: Nodaway
- Erected: 1845

Area
  - Total: 53.16 sq mi (137.7 km^{2})
  - Land: 53.13 sq mi (137.6 km^{2})
  - Water: 0.03 sq mi (0.078 km^{2}) 0.06%
- Elevation: 1,050 ft (320 m)

Population (2020)
  - Total: 534
  - Density: 10.1/sq mi (3.9/km^{2})
- FIPS code: 29-14779342
- GNIS feature ID: 767098

White Cloud Township is a township in Nodaway County, Missouri, United States. At the 2020 census, its population was 534. It contains 53 sections. Arkoe, the only community in the township, is its northeast just west of the One Hundred and Two River.

== History ==
White Cloud Township was erected in 1845, taking its name from White Cloud Creek. In the early 1870s part of this township was split off to help create Grant Township.

== Geography ==
The source of the Arapahoe Creek is in the southwest of this township.

The extinct communities of Whitecloud and Pumpkin Center were both in the center of the township.

Littsville was located in the southern portion of this township.

== Transportation ==
The following highways travel through the township:

- U.S. Route 71
- Route A
- Route H
- Route M
- Route U
