= Jones Branch (One Hundred and Two River tributary) =

Stream in northwest Missouri, U.S.

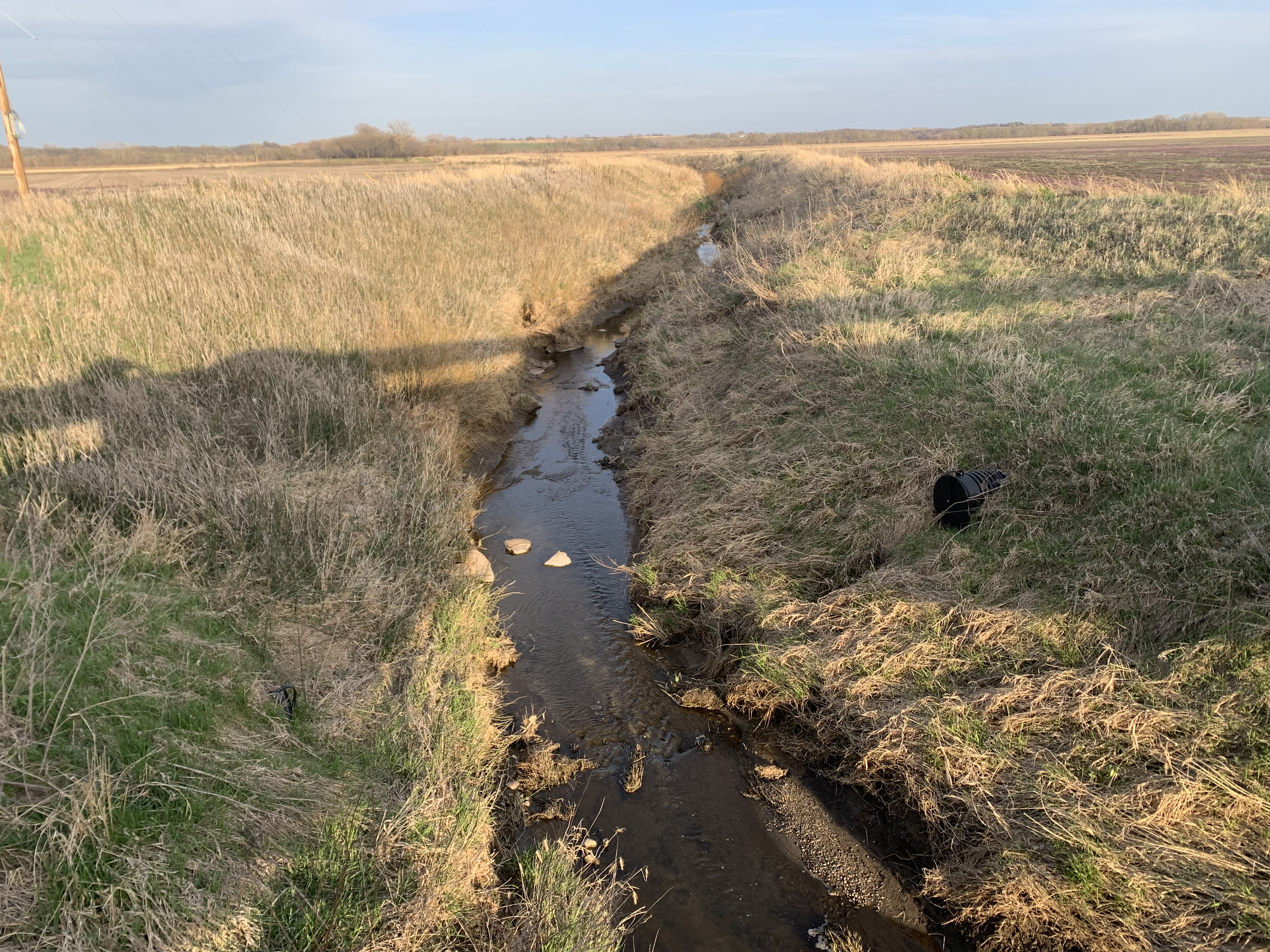
- Jones Branch at Jet Road, northwest of Arkoe

Location
- Country: United States
- State: Missouri
- County: Nodaway

Physical characteristics
- Source
  - location: Polk Township, Nodaway County
  - coordinates: 40°18′32″N 94°52′31″W
  - elevation: 1,080 ft (330 m)
- Mouth: One Hundred and Two River
  - location: Polk Township, Nodaway County
  - coordinates: 40°16′38″N 94°49′27″W
  - elevation: 945 ft (288 m)
- Length: 4.1 mi (6.6 km)

Basin features
- Progression: Jones Branch → One Hundred and Two River → Platte River → Missouri River → Mississippi River → Atlantic Ocean

Jones Branch is a stream in Nodaway County in the U.S. state of Missouri. It is a tributary of the One Hundred and Two River and is 4.1 miles (6.6 km) long.

Jones Branch has the name of an early citizen. The stream headwaters just south of Maryville and flows southeasterly into the One Hundred and Two River 1.5 miles north of Arkoe.

== See also ==
- Tributaries of the One Hundred and Two River
- List of rivers of Missouri
