= White Cloud Township =

White Cloud Township is the name of two townships in the United States:

- White Cloud Township, Mills County, Iowa
- White Cloud Township, Nodaway County, Missouri

== See also ==
- White Cloud (disambiguation)
