= White Cloud Creek =

Stream in Missouri, U.S.

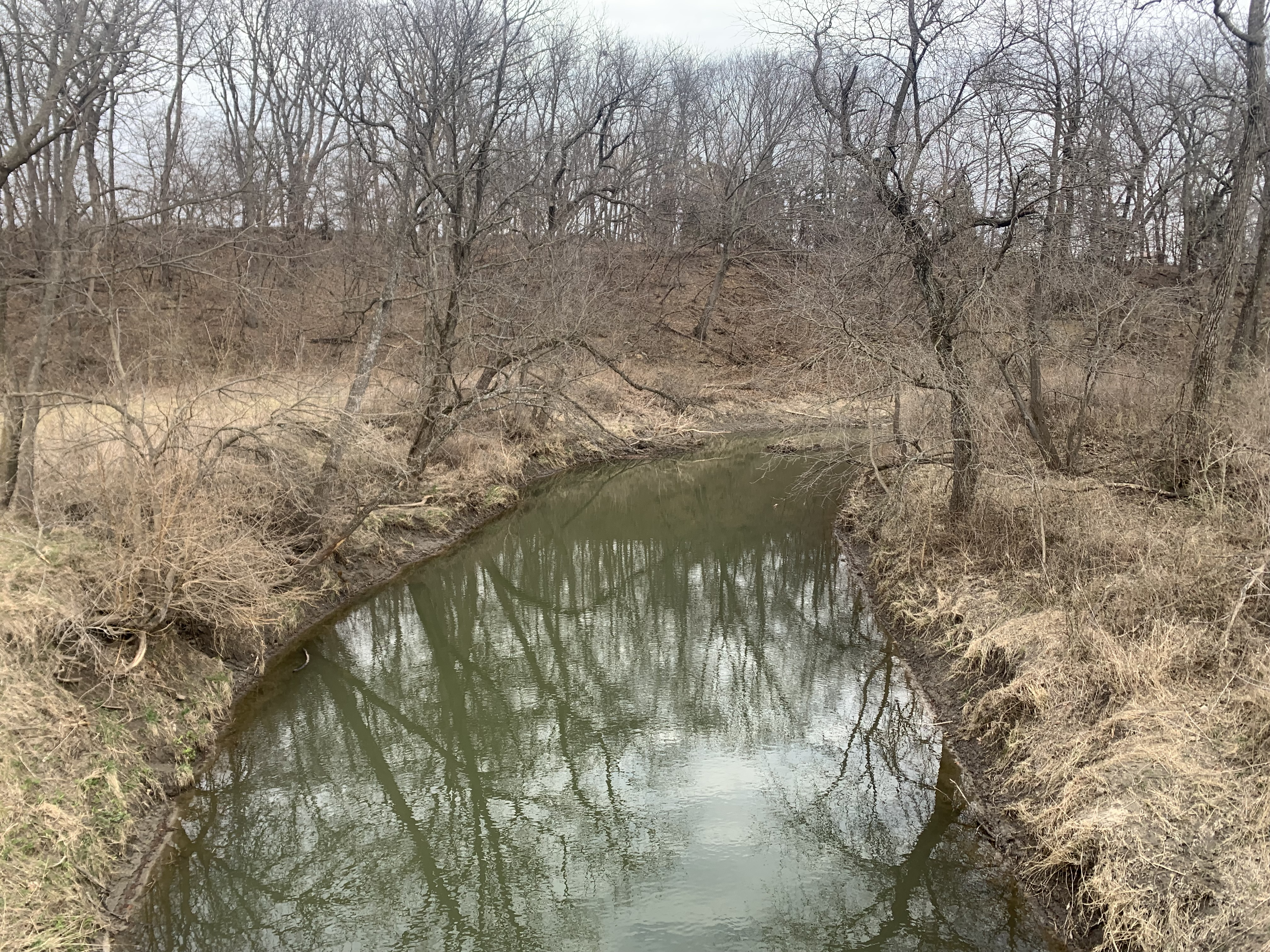
- White Cloud Creek at Impala Trail bridge in White Cloud Township, Nodaway County

Location
- Country: United States
- State: Missouri
- County: Andrew and Nodaway

Physical characteristics
- Source
  - location: Union Township, Nodaway County, Missouri
  - coordinates: 40°27′30″N 94°52′38″W
  - elevation: 1,150 ft (350 m)
- Mouth: One Hundred and Two River
  - location: Benton Township, Andrew County, Missouri
  - coordinates: 40°07′04″N 94°50′17″W
  - elevation: 909 ft (277 m)
- Length: 30.1 mi (48.4 km)

Basin features
- Progression: White Cloud Creek → One Hundred and Two River → Platte River → Missouri River → Mississippi River → Atlantic Ocean

White Cloud Creek is a stream in Nodaway and Andrew counties in the U.S. state of Missouri. It is a tributary of the One Hundred and Two River and is 30.1 miles (48.4 km) long.

== History ==
=== Etymology ===
White Cloud Creek gets its name from Indians, perhaps even of the same name. The stream has also been known as Whitecloud Creek, White Clouds Creek, White River, and White Coal Creek.

=== Communities ===
In the 19th Century, there were two distinct communities along White Cloud Creek named Whitecloud in Nodaway County. The northerly one was located just south of Xenia in Polk Township and the other more prominent Whitecloud was located in White Cloud Township north of Pumpkin Center.

== Geography ==
=== Course ===
The stream headwaters arise in Nodaway County approximately 1.5 miles west of Pickering and flows south-southeast crossing under US Route 71 and Missouri Route 46 three miles west of Maryville. It then turns and flows to the south-southeast passing about 1.5 miles west of the community of Pumpkin Center. It crosses under Route 71 again about three miles southwest of Barnard and enters Andrew County where it enters the One Hundred and Two River approximately one-half mile south of the county line and one mile west of the community of Bolckow.

=== Watershed ===
The watershed of White Cloud Creek is a tall and narrow one stretching across 4 political townships and being closely paralleled by the Nodaway River on its west and its parent river, the One Hundred and Two River. No present communtiies lie in its watershed besides the western portion of Nodaway County's seat, Maryville, which is drained by Peach Creek.

=== Tributaries ===
There are six named direct tributaries of White Cloud Creek: Mullin Creek, Peach Creek, Big Slough, Theater Creek, Pumpkin Center Creek, and Pond Creek. The stream's eastern side has been noted for its many smaller branches, which were appreciated by settlers for agriculture.

=== Crossings ===
There are 6 highways that cross White Cloud Creek in Nodaway County: U.S Highway 71, U.S Highway 136, Route 46, Route A, Route OO, and Route V.

== See also ==
- White Cloud Township, a township in Nodaway County
- Tributaries of the One Hundred and Two River
- List of rivers of Missouri
