= Grant Township, Nodaway County, Missouri =

Township in Nodaway County, Missouri, U.S.

Grant Township
- Township
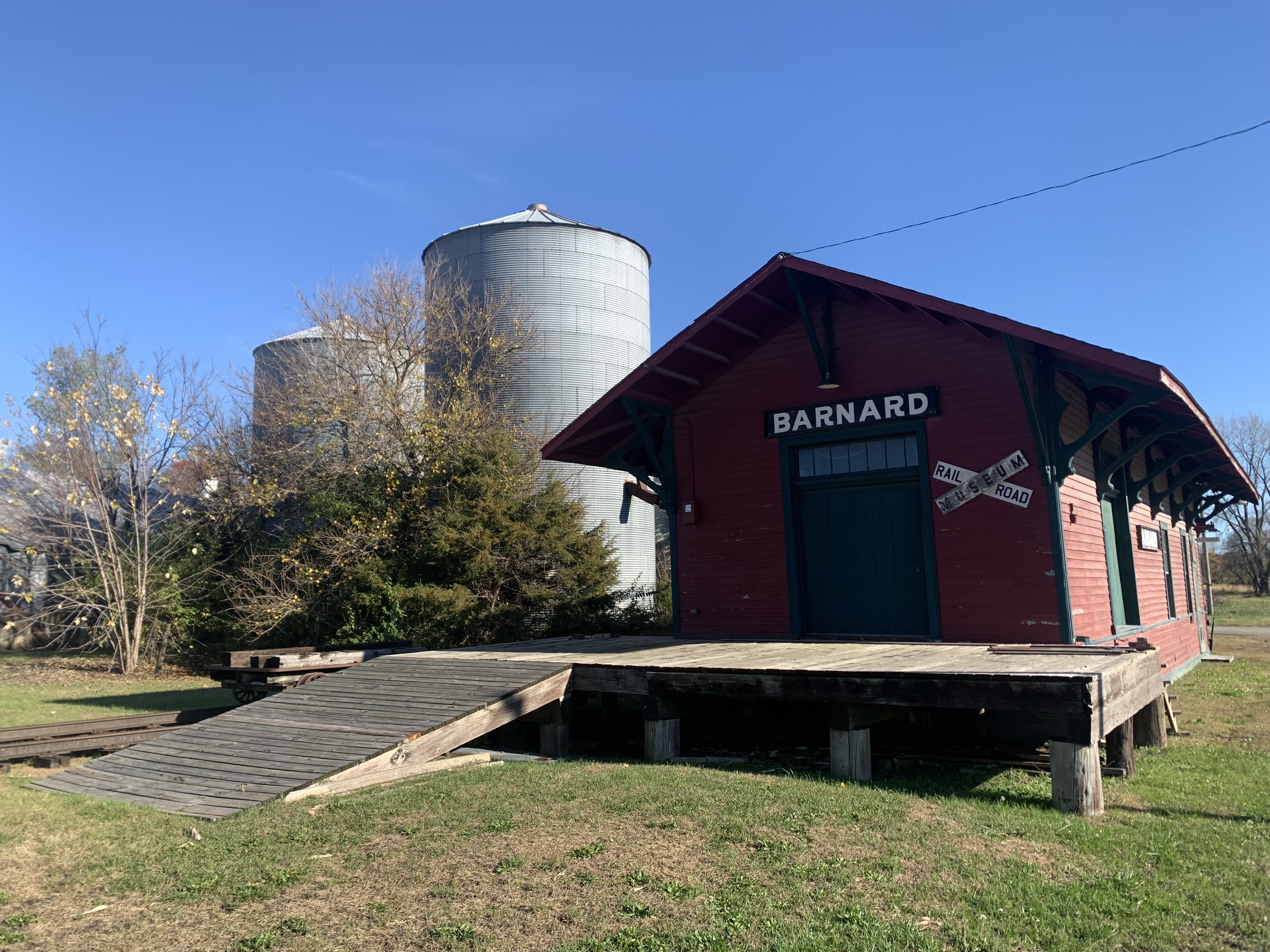
- Railroad Museum in Barnard

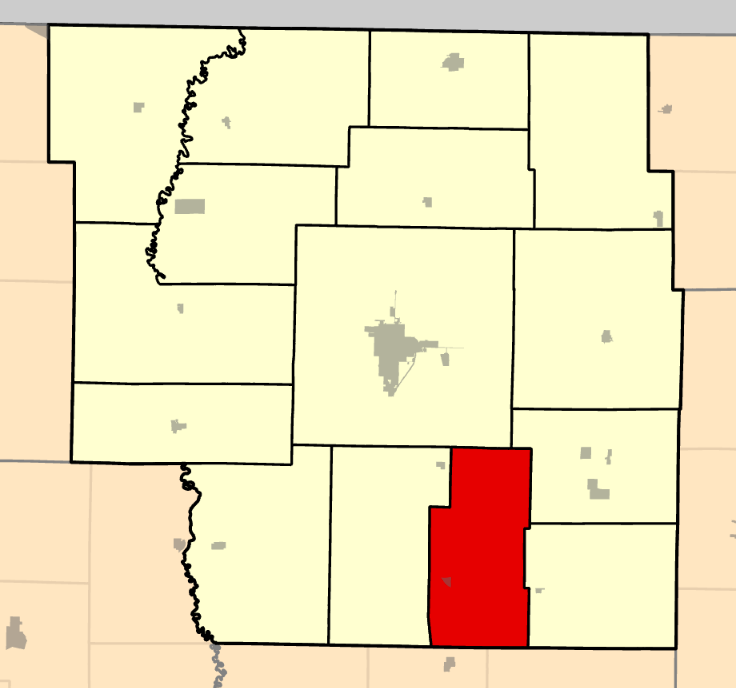
- Coordinates: 40°11′33″N 94°47′26″W
- Country: United States
- State: Missouri
- County: Nodaway
- Erected: 1871

Area
  - Total: 46.47 sq mi (120.4 km^{2})
  - Land: 46.44 sq mi (120.3 km^{2})
  - Water: 0.03 sq mi (0.078 km^{2}) 0.06%
- Elevation: 1,056 ft (322 m)

Population (2020)
  - Total: 529
  - Density: 11.4/sq mi (4.4/km^{2})
- FIPS code: 29-14728504
- GNIS feature ID: 767085

Grant Township is a township in Nodaway County, Missouri, United States. At the 2020 census, its population was 529. Grant Township was one of the later civil townships formed in the county, being created from part of White Cloud and Washington townships. It contains about 47 sections of land. The town of Barnard lies in its southwest, and the extinct hamlet of Prairie Park was situated south of Barnard.

== Etymology ==
Grant Township has the name of General Ulysses S. Grant.

== Transportation ==
The following highways travel through the township:

- Route M
- Route N
- Route U
- Route VV
- Route WW
