= Arkoe, Missouri =

Village in Missouri, U.S.

- Village
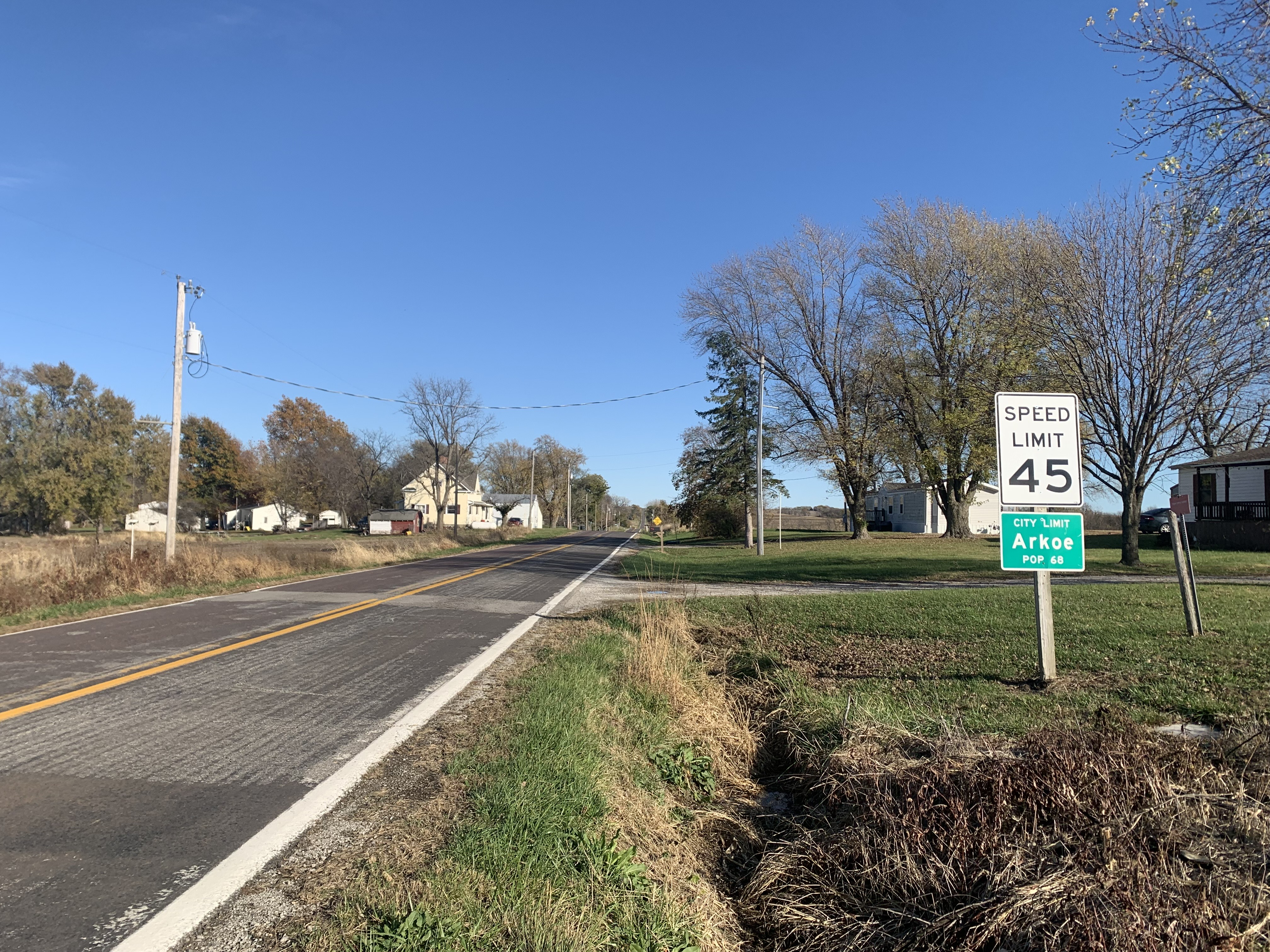
- Arkoe from Route U, facing east

- Location of Arkoe, Missouri
- Coordinates: 40°15′34″N 94°49′41″W
- Country: United States
- State: Missouri
- County: Nodaway
- Township: White Cloud
- Platted: 1874
- Incorporated: 1906

Area
  - Total: 0.13 sq mi (0.33 km^{2})
  - Land: 0.13 sq mi (0.33 km^{2})
  - Water: 0 sq mi (0.00 km^{2})
- Elevation: 984 ft (300 m)

Population (2020)
  - Total: 56
  - Density: 440.3/sq mi (170.01/km^{2})
- Time zone: UTC-6 (Central (CST))
  - Summer (DST): UTC-5 (CDT)
- FIPS code: 29-01864
- GNIS feature ID: 2397438

Arkoe is a village in south-central Nodaway County, Missouri, United States. The population was 56 at the 2020 census.

== History ==
The first community in the vicinity of Arkoe was Bridgewater, which was about a mile north of the current village. Nodaway County's first railroad, called the Missouri Valley Railroad (later becoming part of the Burlington Northern route), built two bridges across the 102 river within 1,000 feet (300 m) of each on a bend in the river and the county built a road bridge between the two in the same location. The railroad platted the community of Bridgewater by the bridges in 1870 and a post office opened there. Dr. Perry H. Talbott who granted the right of way through much of the land in the area, insisted that the town site be located on his property, and on September 16, 1874, he and S.K. Snively laid out Arkoe. Nelson Wilson who had opened a merchandise store in Bridgewater in 1871 moved the building to Arkoe and became its first business in 1874. Other businesses followed including the railroad which moved its depot from Bridgewater to Arkoe.

On September 18, 1880, Dr. Talbott was shot and killed at his home. His wife, Belle, and his sons Charles Edward and Albert Perry were initially suspected and arrested for his murder. Eventually, Belle was released and the sons were tried for their father's murder. Both were convicted and sentenced to hang. They were executed in the Beal Pasture (today Beal Park), on the east side of Maryville, on July 22, 1881. News accounts estimated the number of people present at the hanging at over 10,000. The Talbott brothers' hanging is said to have been the first "legal" hanging in Nodaway County.

Arkoe was formally incorporated in 1906.

The Arkoe post office closed in 1953.

The Arkoe rail line closed in 1979.

== Etymology ==
The United States Board on Geographic Names in its Geographic Names Information System only lists two Arkoes in the United States (the other being in Pike County, Ohio). A variant name was Arcoe.

One of the earliest uses of the name was in the 18th-century fantasy book "The Life and Adventures of Peter Wilkins" by Robert Paltock, which was published in 1751, said an Arkoe is a "water surrounded with wood." The story is about a sailor named Peter Wilkins who is shipwrecked on a mysterious island inhabited by flying people called "Glaws" who inhabit the Arkoes. The book is a mix of adventure, romance, and social commentary, and is considered to be an early example of science fiction.

The book was adopted by humorist Gilbert Abbott à Beckett in 1846 into a London play entitled "Peter Wilkins : Or, the loadstone rock and the flying Indians" (although Arkoe is not mentioned in the play)

It was also adapted in 1923 in a book called "Peter Wilkins: Or, Harlequin Harlokin and the Flying Islanders" by George Thorne."

The exact reason the community was named Arkoe is not specifically known. Arkoe is situated along the One Hundred and Two River, and that is sometimes considered the reason for the name.

An 1882 history of Nodaway County incorrectly stated that the inspiration was mentioned in the Jules Verne novel Twenty Thousand Leagues Under the Seas However, the name is not mentioned in the book.

== Geography ==
According to the United States Census Bureau, the village has a total area of 0.14 square miles (0.36 km^{2}), all land. Arkoe lies in the very flat western plain of the One Hundred and Two River. It is 6 miles (9.7 km) miles north of Barnard, 6 miles (9.7 km) southeast of Maryville, and 6 miles (9.7 km) west of Conception.

== Demographics ==
Historical population
Census	Pop.	Note	%±
1880	33		—
1910	87		—
1920	132		51.7%
1930	99		−25.0%
1940	73		−26.3%
1950	48		−34.2%
1960	36		−25.0%
1970	49		36.1%
1980	63		28.6%
1990	64		1.6%
2000	58		−9.4%
2010	68		17.2%
2020	56		−17.6%
U.S. Decennial Census

=== 2010 census ===
As of the census of 2010, there were 68 people, 23 households, and 16 families living in the village. The population density was 485.7 inhabitants per square mile (187.5/km^{2}). There were 27 housing units at an average density of 192.9 per square mile (74.5/km^{2}). The racial makeup of the village was 100.0% White.

There were 23 households, of which 52.2% had children under the age of 18 living with them, 56.5% were married couples living together, 8.7% had a female householder with no husband present, 4.3% had a male householder with no wife present, and 30.4% were non-families. 26.1% of all households were made up of individuals, and 17.3% had someone living alone who was 65 years of age or older. The average household size was 2.96 and the average family size was 3.50.

The median age in the village was 31.5 years. 39.7% of residents were under the age of 18; 2.9% were between the ages of 18 and 24; 26.5% were from 25 to 44; 23.6% were from 45 to 64; and 7.4% were 65 years of age or older. The gender makeup of the village was 50.0% male and 50.0% female.

=== 2000 census ===
As of the census of 2000, there were 58 people, 24 households, and 13 families living in the town. The population density was 425.4 people per square mile (164.2 people/km^{2}). There were 24 housing units at an average density of 176.0 per square mile (68.0/km^{2}). The racial makeup of the town was 96.55% White, and 3.45% from two or more races.

There were 24 households, out of which 33.3% had children under the age of 18 living with them, 45.8% were married couples living together, 4.2% had a female householder with no husband present, and 41.7% were non-families. 33.3% of all households were made up of individuals, and 16.7% had someone living alone who was 65 years of age or older. The average household size was 2.42 and the average family size was 3.21.

In the town the population was spread out, with 27.6% under the age of 18, 5.2% from 18 to 24, 34.5% from 25 to 44, 17.2% from 45 to 64, and 15.5% who were 65 years of age or older. The median age was 38 years. For every 100 females, there were 152.2 males. For every 100 females age 18 and over, there were 147.1 males.

The median income for a household in the town was $40,000, and the median income for a family was $51,250. Males had a median income of $27,500 versus $21,250 for females. The per capita income for the town was $13,725. There were 14.3% of families and 14.3% of the population living below the poverty line, including 23.5% of under eighteens and none of those over 64.

== See also ==
- List of cities in Missouri
