= Japanese destroyer Shirakumo =

Two destroyers of the Imperial Japanese Navy have been named Shirakumo (白雲, "White Cloud"):

- Japanese destroyer Shirakumo (1901), lead ship of Shirakumo-class destroyer of the Imperial Japanese Navy during the Russo-Japanese War
- Japanese destroyer Shirakumo (1927), a Fubuki-class destroyer of the Imperial Japanese Navy during World War II

== See also ==
- White Cloud (disambiguation)
