= Washington Township, Nodaway County, Missouri =

Township in Nodaway County, Missouri, U.S.

Washington Township
- Township
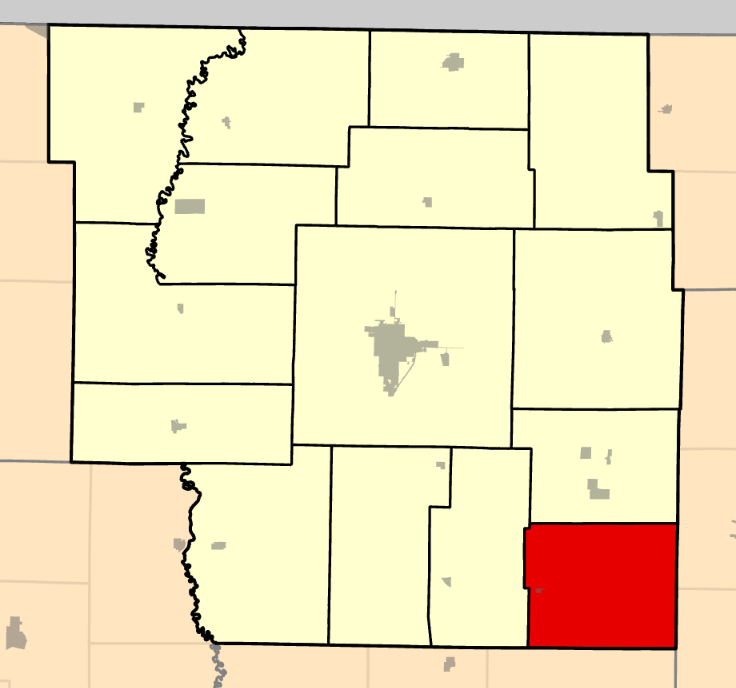
- Coordinates: 40°10′32″N 94°40′51″W
- Country: United States
- State: Missouri
- County: Nodaway
- Erected: 1845

Area
  - Total: 47.25 sq mi (122.4 km^{2})
  - Land: 47.24 sq mi (122.4 km^{2})
  - Water: 0.01 sq mi (0.026 km^{2}) 0.02%
- Elevation: 1,096 ft (334 m)

Population (2020)
  - Total: 272
  - Density: 5.8/sq mi (2.2/km^{2})
- FIPS code: 29-14777614
- GNIS feature ID: 767097

Washington Township is a township in Nodaway County, Missouri, United States. At the 2020 census, its population was 272. It contains about 47 sections. Guilford, its only remaining community, lies west of center one mile east of the Platte River, and New Guilford once existed west of Guilford but by the early 1900s the two communities were not distinguished.

== History ==
Washington Township was first organized in 1845 and was named after President George Washington. The township was reduced in size in 1866 and again in 1871 to form Jefferson Township and Grant Township.

== Setllements ==
A post office known as Gillett in the southeast of the township, existed from at least 1885 to 1896 and is depicted in a turn of the century map.

== Transportation ==
The following highways travel through the township:

- Route AE
- Route AH
- Route J
- Route M
