= Mozingo Lake =

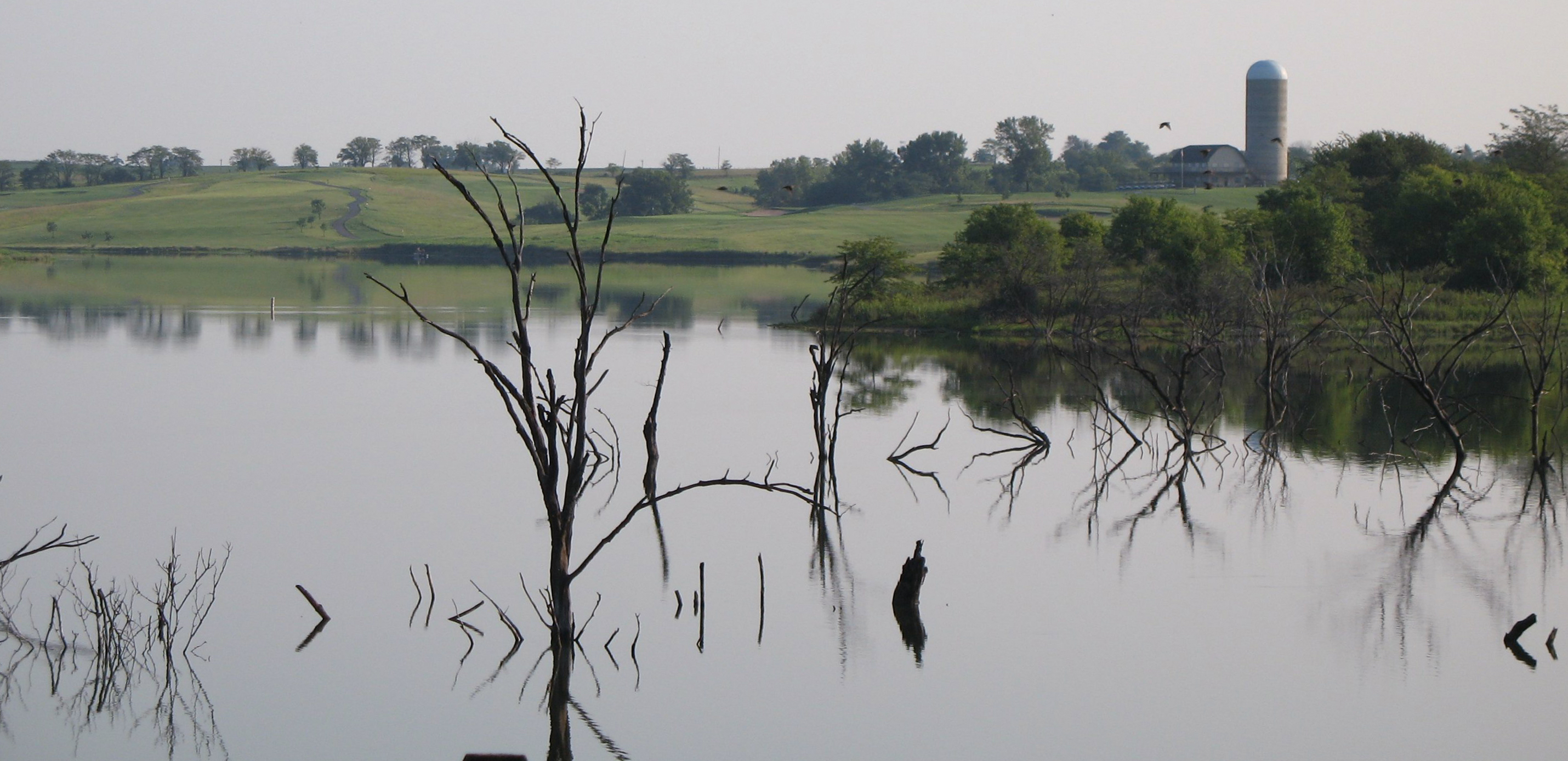
- Lake with the Golf Course grain silo in the background

- Location in Missouri
- Location: Nodaway County, Missouri, United States
- Coordinates: 40°21′31″N 94°45′52″W
- Type: Reservoir
- Primary inflows: Mozingo Creek
- Primary outflows: Mozingo Creek
- Surface area: 1,006 acres (407 ha)
- Max. depth: 50 ft (15 m)
- Shore length^{1}: 26 mi (42 km)
- Surface elevation: 1,050 ft (320 m)
- ^{1} Shore length is not a well-defined measure.

Mozingo Lake is a 1,006-acre (4.07 km²) reservoir located in eastern Nodaway County, approximately 5 miles east of Maryville. Constructed in the early 1990s, the lake serves as the primary drinking water source for the city of Maryville and anchors the 3,000-acre Mozingo Lake Recreation Park, a regional destination for outdoor recreation and tourism.

== History ==
Construction of Mozingo Lake began in 1991 and was completed in 1992 by damming Mozingo Creek, a perennial stream that originates near the Iowa border. The lake filled rapidly due to heavy rainfall and briefly overtopped its dam during the Great Flood of 1993. Initial fish stocking began in 1993 with bluegill and channel catfish, followed by largemouth bass in 1994 and walleye in 1996.

== Ecology ==
Mozingo Lake is considered a eutrophic reservoir, with elevated levels of nutrients and phytoplankton biomass. These conditions have led to periodic harmful algal blooms (HABs), particularly during summer months. In 2020, the lake was listed on Missouri’s 303(d) list of impaired waters due to high levels of chlorophyll-a, nitrogen, and cyanobacteria. The lake also experiences taste and odor issues in drinking water due to geosmin, a compound produced by cyanobacteria.

Despite these challenges, the lake supports a diverse fishery managed by the Missouri Department of Conservation. Common species include largemouth bass, walleye, bluegill, channel catfish, and black crappie.

=== Hydrology ===
Mozingo Lake is part of the Mozingo Creek watershed, which drains into the One Hundred and Two River. The lake is approximately 4.2 miles long, with an average depth of 10.5 feet and a maximum depth of 50 feet. The watershed is predominantly agricultural, with 39% pastureland and 37% cropland, contributing to nutrient and sediment runoff into the lake.

== Recreation ==
The surrounding 3,000-acre Mozingo Lake Recreation Park is owned and operated by the City of Maryville. Amenities include RV and tent camping, eight rustic cabins, a public beach, equestrian and hiking trails, disc golf, and the Mozingo Event Center, which hosts weddings, conferences, and regional events.

=== Golf ===
Mozingo Lake is home to the Mozingo Lake Golf Course, which includes the 18-hole Sechrest Course and the 9-hole Watson Course. The Sechrest 18 was designed by Donald Sechrest and features over 7,100 yards of championship-level play. The Watson 9, named after Missouri native Tom Watson, offers a shorter, family-friendly layout.

=== Events ===
Mozingo Lake Recreation Park hosts a variety of public events throughout the year, including fishing tournaments, triathlons, fireworks displays, and seasonal festivals. The official events calendar provides up-to-date listings of upcoming activities.

== See also ==
- Maryville, Missouri
- List of lakes of Missouri
