= Prairie Park, Missouri =

Extinct community in Missouri, U.S.

Coordinates: 40°09′36″N 94°49′08″W

Prairie Park is an extinct community in Nodaway County, Missouri, in the United States.

A post office named Prairie Park was commissioned on July 1, 1862. It was situated southwest of Guilford and northwest of Whitesville. When Barnard was founded one mile north in 1870, its post office moved to there. The settlement only consisted of the post office, a small general store, and a few primitive dwellings. There is no trace of this settlement extant.
