= Mozingo Creek =

Stream in northwest Missouri, U.S.

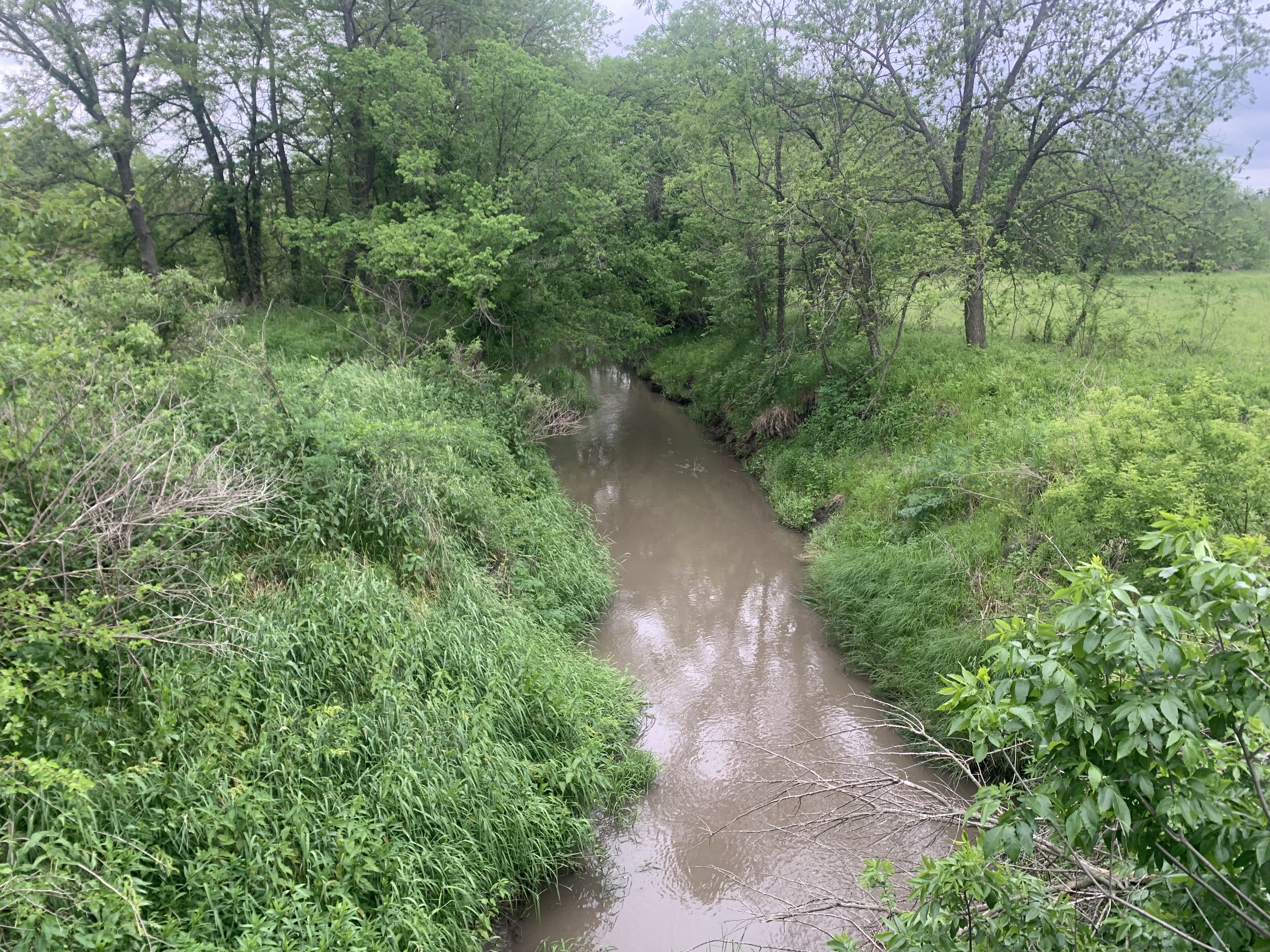
- Mozingo Creek at 200th Street north of Mozingo Lake

Location
- Country: United States
- State: Missouri
- County: Nodaway

Physical characteristics
- Source
  - location: Independence Township, Nodaway County
  - coordinates: 40°30′28″N 94°43′12″W
  - elevation: 1,180 ft (360 m)
- Mouth: One Hundred and Two River
  - location: Polk Township, Nodaway County
  - coordinates: 40°17′37″N 94°49′31″W
  - elevation: 951 ft (290 m)
- Length: 20.0 mi (32.2 km)

Basin features
- Progression: Mozingo Creek → One Hundred and Two River → Platte River → Missouri River → Mississippi River → Atlantic Ocean

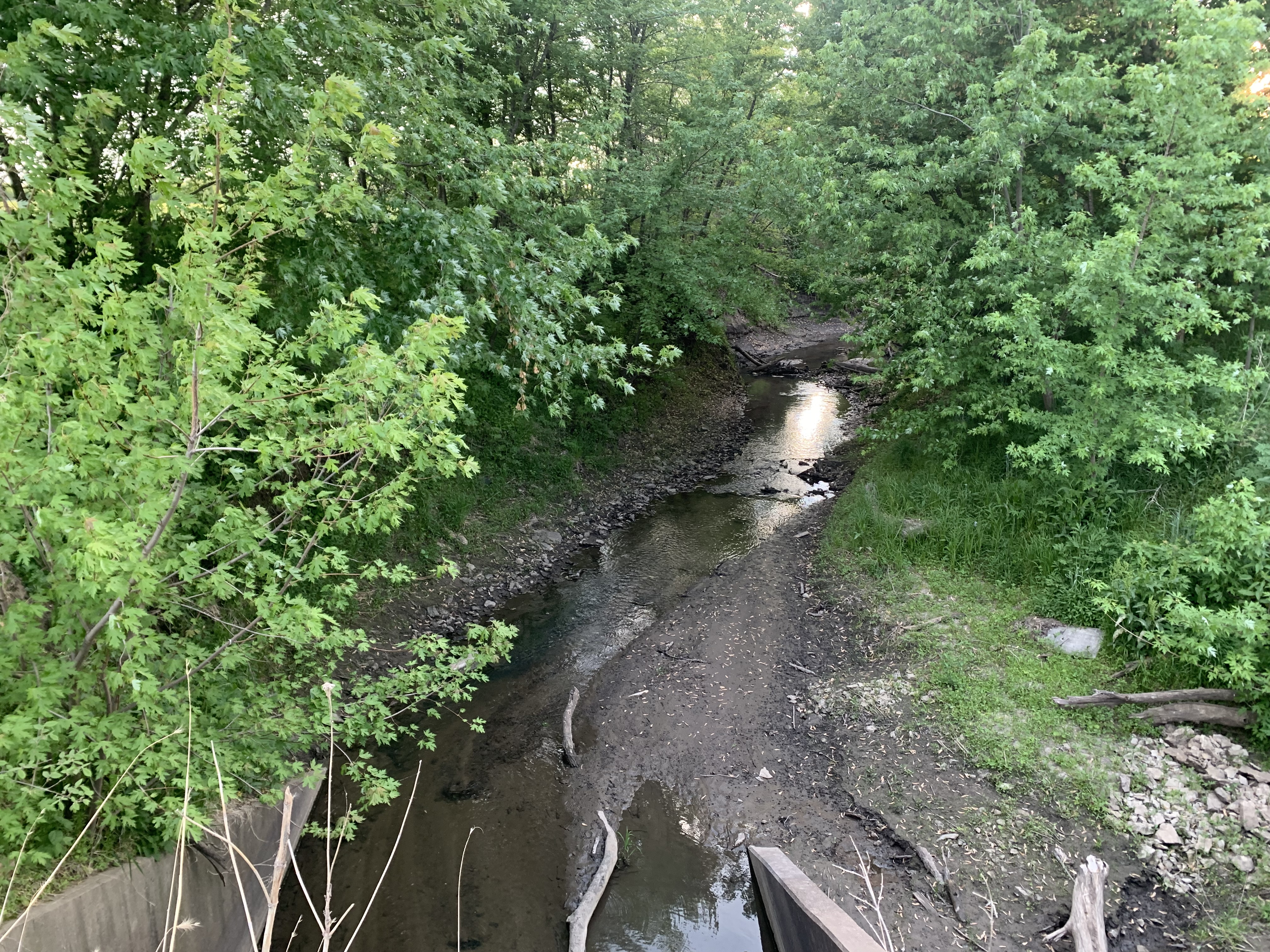
Mozingo Creek at Katydid Road bridge north of Arkoe

Mozingo Creek is a stream in Nodaway County in the U.S. state of Missouri. It is a tributary of the One Hundred and Two River and is 20.0 miles (32.2 km) long. The stream is monitored a few miles southeast of Pickering by the NOAA.

Mozingo Creek has the name of John Mozingo, a pioneer settler. A reservoir was built on the creek called Mozingo Lake about five miles east of Maryville, Missouri. The creek begins in northeastern Nodaway County and flows southwesterly about 8 miles before reaching the north end of Mozingo Lake.

A variant name was Mozingo Branch.

== See also ==
- Tributaries of the One Hundred and Two River
- List of rivers of Missouri
