= Pumpkin Center, Nodaway County, Missouri =

Extinct hamlet in Missouri, U.S.

Coordinates: 40°12′01″N 94°52′04″W

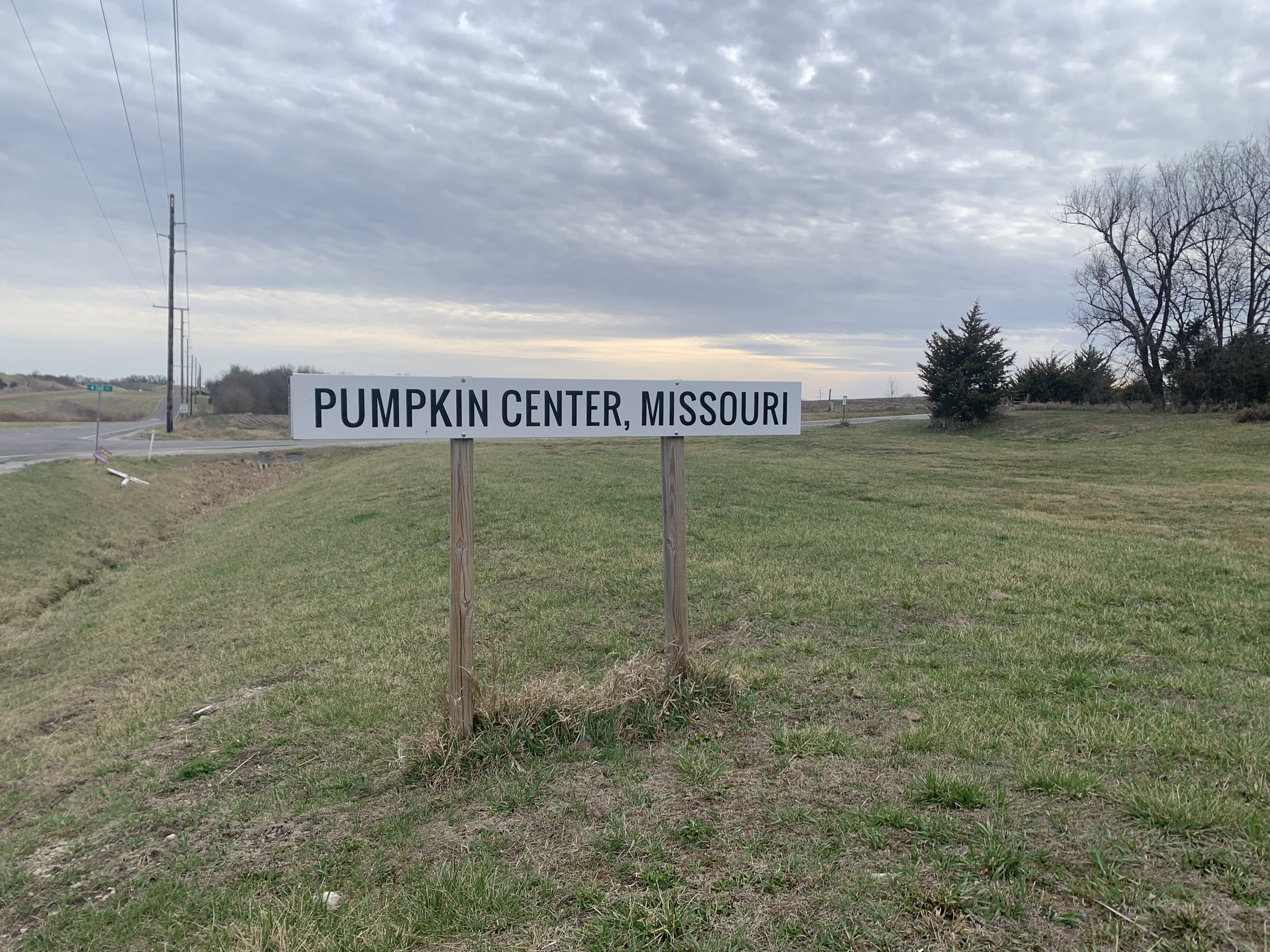
Pumpkin Center Sign on US HIghway 71

Pumpkin Center is an extinct community located in White Cloud Township, Nodaway County, Missouri, at an elevation of 1,020 feet, approximately 10 miles south of the Nodaway County seat of Maryville on US Route 71.
