= Guilford, Missouri =

- Village
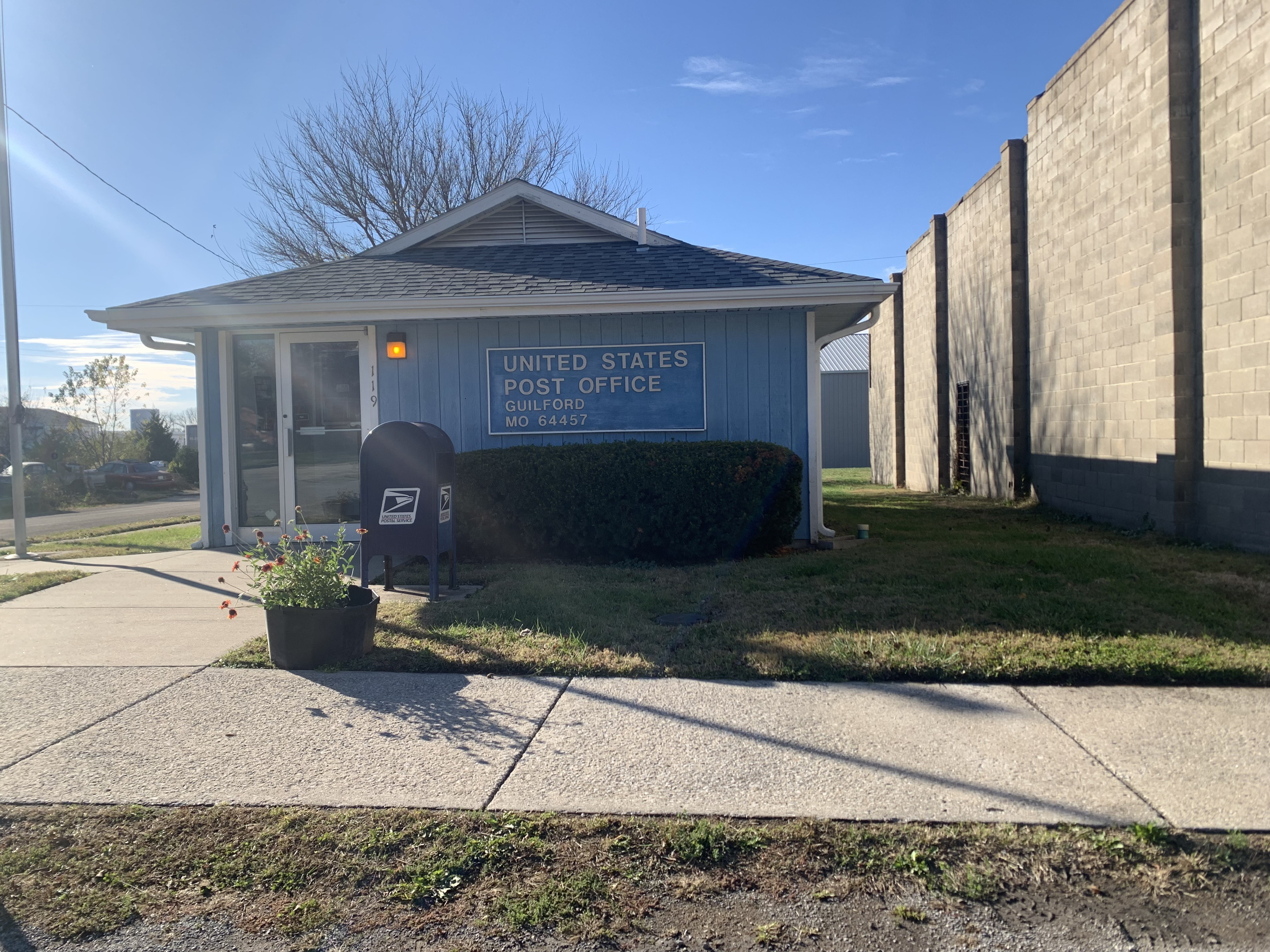
- US Post Office in Guilford

- Location of Guilford, Missouri
- Coordinates: 40°10′07″N 94°44′10″W
- Country: United States
- State: Missouri
- County: Nodaway
- Township: Washington
- Incorporated: 1880

Area
  - Total: 0.073 sq mi (0.19 km^{2})
  - Land: 0.073 sq mi (0.19 km^{2})
  - Water: 0 sq mi (0.00 km^{2})
- Elevation: 951 ft (290 m)

Population (2020)
  - Total: 60
  - Density: 838.3/sq mi (323.67/km^{2})
- Time zone: UTC-6 (Central (CST))
  - Summer (DST): UTC-5 (CDT)
- ZIP code: 64457
- Area code: 660
- FIPS code: 29-29692
- GNIS feature ID: 2396980

Guilford is a village in southeastern Nodaway County, Missouri, United States, near the Platte River. The population was 60 at the 2020 census.

== History ==
Guilford was founded about 1856. The community was named in commemoration of the Battle of Guilford Court House in the American Revolutionary War. A post office called Carterville operated from 1853 to 1856 but then the name changed to Guilford and has been in operation since.

== Geography ==
The community is located at the intersection of Missouri routes M and AH approximately one half mile east of the Platte River and three miles north of the Nodaway-Andrew county line. The community of Barnard is 4.5 miles to the west on route M. and Whitesville lies 7.5 miles south.

According to the United States Census Bureau, Guilford has a total area of 0.09 square miles (0.23 km^{2}), all land.

== Demographics ==
Historical population
Census	Pop.	Note	%±
1880	67		—
1900	235		—
1910	207		−11.9%
1920	273		31.9%
1930	201		−26.4%
1940	227		12.9%
1950	164		−27.8%
1960	125		−23.8%
1970	105		−16.0%
1980	87		−17.1%
1990	93		6.9%
2000	87		−6.5%
2010	85		−2.3%
2020	60		−29.4%
U.S. Decennial Census

=== 2010 census ===
As of the census of 2010, there were 85 people, 36 households, and 23 families living in the village. The population density was 944.4 inhabitants per square mile (364.6/km^{2}). There were 49 housing units at an average density of 544.4 per square mile (210.2/km^{2}). The racial makeup of the village was 100.0% White.

There were 36 households, of which 25.0% had children under the age of 18 living with them, 41.7% were married couples living together, 8.3% had a female householder with no husband present, 13.9% had a male householder with no wife present, and 36.1% were non-families. 33.3% of all households were made up of individuals, and 8.4% had someone living alone who was 65 years of age or older. The average household size was 2.36 and the average family size was 3.00.

The median age in the village was 38.5 years. 17.6% of residents were under the age of 18; 10.7% were between the ages of 18 and 24; 28.2% were from 25 to 44; 36.5% were from 45 to 64; and 7.1% were 65 years of age or older. The gender makeup of the village was 52.9% male and 47.1% female.

=== 2000 census ===
As of the census of 2000, there were 87 people, 34 households, and 21 families living in the town. The population density was 1,130.5 inhabitants per square mile (436.5/km^{2}). There were 41 housing units at an average density of 532.8 per square mile (205.7/km^{2}). The racial makeup of the town was 100.00% White. Hispanic or Latino of any race were 4.60% of the population.

There were 34 households, out of which 35.3% had children under the age of 18 living with them, 50.0% were married couples living together, 8.8% had a female householder with no husband present, and 35.3% were non-families. 32.4% of all households were made up of individuals, and 23.5% had someone living alone who was 65 years of age or older. The average household size was 2.56 and the average family size was 3.27.

In the town the population was spread out, with 26.4% under the age of 18, 12.6% from 18 to 24, 31.0% from 25 to 44, 11.5% from 45 to 64, and 18.4% who were 65 years of age or older. The median age was 37 years. For every 100 females, there were 102.3 males. For every 100 females age 18 and over, there were 88.2 males.

The median income for a household in the town was $20,625, and the median income for a family was $28,750. Males had a median income of $25,750 versus $19,500 for females. The per capita income for the town was $9,391. There were 25.0% of families and 28.6% of the population living below the poverty line, including 40.0% of under eighteens and 25.0% of those over 64.

== Education ==
Until May 2013 Guilford was served by the South Nodaway R-IV School District, and was home to the elementary school (grades Pre-K-6). The high school, grades 7-12, was in Barnard, five miles west of town. In May 2013 all grades were moved to the Barnard school and the school in Guilford was closed.

== Notable person ==
- Jerry Wallace - Country and popular music singer. His hits included "Primrose Lane", "Shutters And Boards", "In The Misty Moonlight", and If You Leave Me Tonight I'll Cry.
