= Hopkins, Missouri =

City in Nodaway County, Missouri, United States

- City
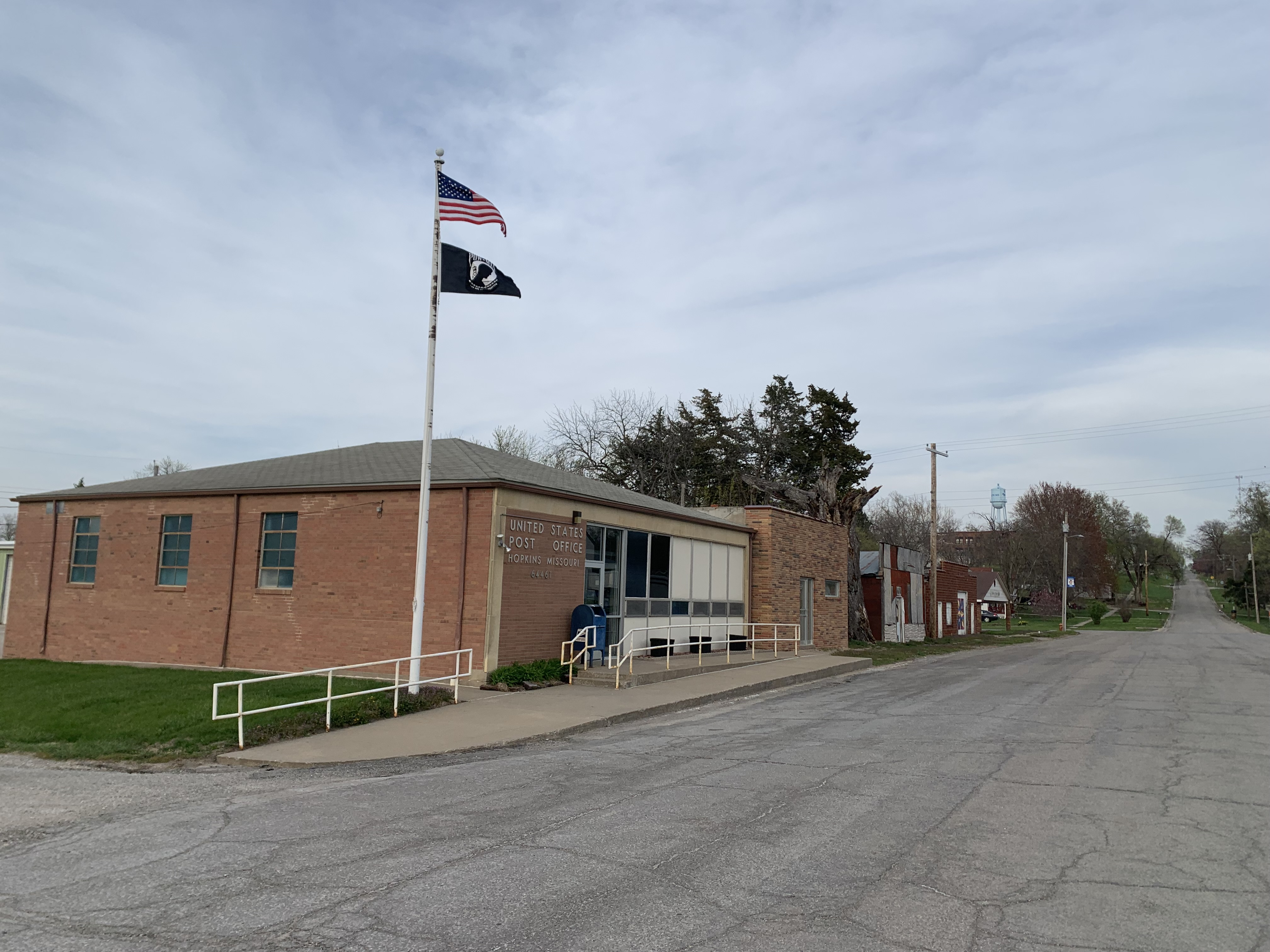
- Hopkins Post office
- Motto: Barn Quilt City USA
- Location of Hopkins, Missouri

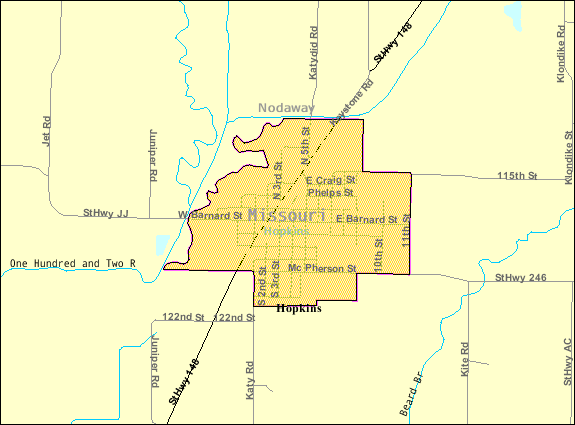
- U.S. Census Map
- Coordinates: 40°33′04″N 94°49′01″W
- Country: United States
- State: Missouri
- County: Nodaway
- Township: Hopkins
- Platted: 1870

Area
  - Total: 0.71 sq mi (1.85 km^{2})
  - Land: 0.71 sq mi (1.85 km^{2})
  - Water: 0 sq mi (0.00 km^{2})
- Elevation: 1,053 ft (321 m)

Population (2020)
  - Total: 472
  - Density: 661.6/sq mi (255.46/km^{2})
- Time zone: UTC-6 (Central (CST))
  - Summer (DST): UTC-5 (CDT)
- ZIP code: 64461
- Area code: 660
- FIPS code: 29-33004
- GNIS feature ID: 2394418

Hopkins is a city in northern Nodaway County, Missouri, United States. The population was 472 at the 2020 Census, the third largest city in the county.

== History ==
Hopkins was laid out in 1870. The community has the name of A.L. Hopkins of the Kansas City, St. Joseph and Council Bluffs Railroad. The railroad later became the Chicago, Burlington and Quincy and finally the Burlington Northern before tracks were removed in 1983. A post office called Hopkins has been in operation since 1871.

The Hopkins Tornado of 1881 is believed to have been one of the first recorded F5 tornadoes.

On Sunday afternoon November 16, 1952, Hopkins was struck by a tornado which greatly damaged the downtown business district. Mary Jane Truman, sister of Harry S Truman, had appeared in the community almost to the day a year earlier. She contacted her brother who was on a yacht. Hopkins was the first town in the United States of under 1,000 people to receive federal disaster relief. The government sent the community $10,000 which was put under the administration of Wren Peve, a local businessman. Mr. Peve kept accurate track of the spending and when all the needs were met it was found that there was a surplus. Peve then wrote a check and sent that surplus back to Washington. The cleanup was under the direction of Landon Wallace, the local Ford salesman and also the Hopkins Fire Chief. During the three weeks of cleanup, most of the second floors of the downtown buildings were removed by his order.

In the first half the 20th century Rancho del Rayo which was at least 3,900 acres claimed to be the biggest hereford ranch in the state of Missouri.

In September 1933, the Missouri Highway Patrol cornered and killed Harold B. Thornbrugh a Kansas outlaw, who at the time was living in New Market, Iowa. Thornbrugh was wanted for bank and postal robbery, the murder of Omaha Police Officer Otto Peterson and the attempted murder of Franklin County, Kansas Sheriff William Wantland. The day Harold Thornbrugh was killed in Hopkins, his brother Cecil stood before Judge Hopkins in Topeka, Kansas on the same charges pending against Harold. One officer was seriously wounded in the head during the brief gun battle.

During World War II Hopkins, a town of less than 1,000 at the time, lost fourteen men. This included two brothers, Charles and George Russell, who died in April 1945 within twenty-four hours of each other. Charles drowned in the Pacific and George was accidentally shot in Germany while guarding prisoners of war. Carl Melvin went down with the USS Indianapolis, and Charles Pistole was killed at Tarawa while operating a landing craft. In other conflicts, Glenn Ulmer died in World War I, the American Legion Post is named in his honor, and Gary Cross died in Vietnam. Hopkins suffered no deaths in Korea.

Hopkins was the final home of jockey Clive Dixon and his wife Betty June, who trained and owned the National Appaloosa Show Champion, Two-Eyed Sioux.

Each year the town celebrates the Hopkins Picnic the second weekend in July. This has been a yearly celebration since 1888.

The last electromechanical telephone switch in the U.S. was located in nearby North Hopkins, Iowa, served by the CO in Hopkins. This switch converted to digital on September 15, 1999.

== Geography ==
Hopkins is located at the intersection of Missouri routes 148 and 246 approximately two miles south of the Missouri-Iowa border. Maryville lies south about 14 miles with Pickering halfway in between, and Bedford, Iowa is about nine miles northeast. The East Fork One Hundred and Two River flows past the north and west sides of the community and meets with the West Fork to form the One Hundred and Two River about three miles southwest of the community.

According to the United States Census Bureau, the city has a total area of 0.72 square miles (1.86 km^{2}), all land.

== Demographics ==
Historical population
Census	Pop.	Note	%±
1880	920		—
1890	846		−8.0%
1900	907		7.2%
1910	909		0.2%
1920	918		1.0%
1930	815		−11.2%
1940	834		2.3%
1950	825		−1.1%
1960	710		−13.9%
1970	656		−7.6%
1980	634		−3.4%
1990	575		−9.3%
2000	579		0.7%
2010	532		−8.1%
2020	472		−11.3%
U.S. Decennial Census

=== 2010 census ===
As of the census of 2010, there were 532 people, 219 households, and 146 families residing in the city. The population density was 738.9 inhabitants per square mile (285.3/km^{2}). There were 261 housing units at an average density of 362.5 per square mile (140.0/km^{2}). The racial makeup of the city was 97.6% White, 1.7% African American, 0.4% Asian, and 0.4% from two or more races. Hispanic or Latino of any race were 0.8% of the population.

There were 219 households, of which 32.9% had children under the age of 18 living with them, 50.7% were married couples living together, 8.7% had a female householder with no husband present, 7.3% had a male householder with no wife present, and 33.3% were non-families. 28.8% of all households were made up of individuals, and 13.3% had someone living alone who was 65 years of age or older. The average household size was 2.43 and the average family size was 3.03.

The median age in the city was 35.6 years. 28.4% of residents were under the age of 18; 7.8% were between the ages of 18 and 24; 24.3% were from 25 to 44; 24.5% were from 45 to 64; and 15.2% were 65 years of age or older. The gender makeup of the city was 48.7% male and 51.3% female.

=== 2000 census ===
As of the census of 2000, there were 579 people, 235 households, and 167 families residing in the city. The population density was 801.5 inhabitants per square mile (309.5/km^{2}). There were 265 housing units at an average density of 366.8 per square mile (141.6/km^{2}). The racial makeup of the city was 98.96% White, and 1.04% from two or more races. Hispanic or Latino of any race were 0.52% of the population.

There were 235 households, out of which 32.3% had children under the age of 18 living with them, 57.4% were married couples living together, 8.5% had a female householder with no husband present, and 28.9% were non-families. 26.0% of all households were made up of individuals, and 12.3% had someone living alone who was 65 years of age or older. The average household size was 2.46 and the average family size was 2.98.

In the city the population was spread out, with 26.1% under the age of 18, 12.1% from 18 to 24, 25.6% from 25 to 44, 20.2% from 45 to 64, and 16.1% who were 65 years of age or older. The median age was 35 years. For every 100 females there were 94.3 males. For every 100 females age 18 and over, there were 91.9 males.

The median income for a household in the city was $28,194, and the median income for a family was $32,500. Males had a median income of $27,500 versus $21,932 for females. The per capita income for the city was $13,378. About 12.6% of families and 14.5% of the population were below the poverty line, including 13.0% of those under age 18 and 19.3% of those age 65 or over.

== Notable persons ==
- George Hayford, attorney
- Grant Wallace, Occult writer
- Dwayne Woldruff, Matador

== See also ==
- List of cities in Missouri
