= Barnard, Missouri =

- City
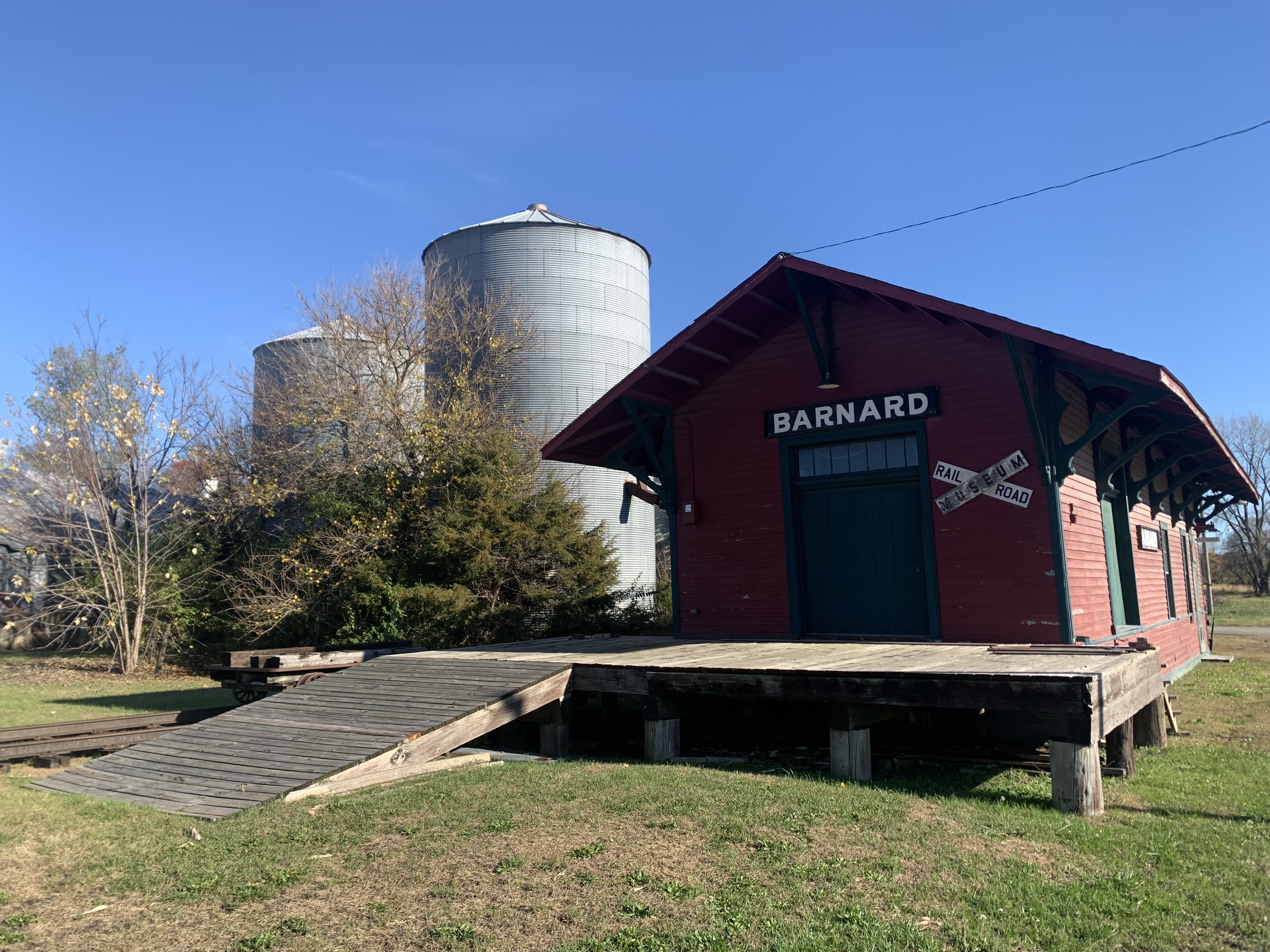
- Railroad Museum in Barnard, Missouri

- Location of Barnard, Missouri
- Coordinates: 40°10′31″N 94°49′23″W
- Country: United States
- State: Missouri
- County: Nodaway
- Township: Grant
- Platted: April 10, 1870

Area
  - Total: 0.15 sq mi (0.39 km^{2})
  - Land: 0.15 sq mi (0.39 km^{2})
  - Water: 0 sq mi (0.00 km^{2})
- Elevation: 991 ft (302 m)

Population (2020)
  - Total: 201
  - Density: 1,328.7/sq mi (513.01/km^{2})
- Time zone: UTC-6 (Central (CST))
  - Summer (DST): UTC-5 (CDT)
- ZIP code: 64423
- Area code: 660
- FIPS code: 29-03340
- GNIS feature ID: 2394061

Barnard is a city in southern Nodaway County, Missouri, United States. As of the 2020 census, the city population was 201.

== History ==
Barnard was platted on April 10, 1870. The city was named for a railroad superintendent named Barnard, though the exact name is in dispute, either J. F. Barnard or B. F. Barnard. Originally the post office was in nearby Prairie Park, but in 1871 it moved to Barnard.

A human skeleton 12 ft 0 in (3.66 m) tall with ribs nearly 4 ft (1.2 m) long found near Barnard, Missouri, on September 13, 1883.

== Geography ==
Barnard is located in southern Nodaway County on the east bank of the One Hundred and Two River at the intersection of Missouri routes M and WW approximately 2.5 miles east of US Route 71. Guilford is 4.5 miles east on route M and Bolckow is four miles to the south in northern Andrew County.

According to the United States Census Bureau, the city has a total area of 0.15 square miles (0.39 km^{2}), all land.

== Demographics ==
Historical population
Census	Pop.	Note	%±
1880	424		—
1890	427		0.7%
1900	362		−15.2%
1910	338		−6.6%
1920	345		2.1%
1930	325		−5.8%
1940	341		4.9%
1950	275		−19.4%
1960	237		−13.8%
1970	206		−13.1%
1980	234		13.6%
1990	234		0.0%
2000	257		9.8%
2010	221		−14.0%
2020	201		−9.0%
U.S. Decennial Census

=== 2010 census ===
As of the census of 2010, there were 221 people, 93 households, and 59 families living in the city. The population density was 1,473.3 inhabitants per square mile (568.8/km^{2}). There were 107 housing units at an average density of 713.3 per square mile (275.4/km^{2}). The racial makeup of the city was 99.5% White and 0.5% African American. Hispanic or Latino of any race were 1.4% of the population.

There were 93 households, of which 32.3% had children under the age of 18 living with them, 58.1% were married couples living together, 5.4% had a female householder with no husband present, and 36.6% were non-families. 34.4% of all households were made up of individuals, and 19.4% had someone living alone who was 65 years of age or older. The average household size was 2.38 and the average family size was 3.08.

The median age in the city was 39.9 years. 24.9% of residents were under the age of 18; 6.7% were between the ages of 18 and 24; 24.9% were from 25 to 44; 23% were from 45 to 64; and 20.4% were 65 years of age or older. The gender makeup of the city was 51.6% male and 48.4% female.

=== 2000 census ===
As of the census of 2000, there were 257 people, 104 households, and 65 families living in the city. The population density was 1,654.2 inhabitants per square mile (638.7/km^{2}). There were 115 housing units at an average density of 740.2 per square mile (285.8/km^{2}). The racial makeup of the city was 100.00% White.

There were 104 households, out of which 30.8% had children under the age of 18 living with them, 56.7% were married couples living together, 4.8% had a female householder with no husband present, and 37.5% were non-families. 34.6% of all households were made up of individuals, and 18.3% had someone living alone who was 65 years of age or older. The average household size was 2.47 and the average family size was 3.23.

In the city the population was spread out, with 29.6% under the age of 18, 4.3% from 18 to 24, 26.5% from 25 to 44, 22.6% from 45 to 64, and 17.1% who were 65 years of age or older. The median age was 36 years. For every 100 females there were 105.6 males. For every 100 females age 18 and over, there were 88.5 males.

The median income for a household in the city was $35,000, and the median income for a family was $39,750. Males had a median income of $30,000 versus $19,000 for females. The per capita income for the city was $16,868. About 1.6% of families and 10.9% of the population were below the poverty line, including 9.4% of those under the age of eighteen and 22.7% of those 65 or over.

== Education ==
Barnard is the home to the newly consolidated South Nodaway Co. R-IV School District. Originally, the Pre-K through 6th Grade elementary school had been located in nearby Guilford, five miles east of the town. In 2013, due to the rising costs of maintaining the old elementary school, the district was consolidated into one building in Barnard by expanding the existing high school.
