= Whitecloud, Nodaway County, Missouri =

Extinct hamlet in Missouri, U.S.

Coordinates: 40°12′32″N 94°53′48″W

Whitecloud (also spelled White Cloud) is an extinct community in southern Nodaway County, in the U.S. state of Missouri. It is about 12 miles south of Maryville, Missouri, and is just west of US Route 71. One 19th Century map erroneously located the settlement northwest of Maryville.

== History ==
A post office called White Cloud was established in 1856 and remained in operation until 1901. The community was named after nearby White Cloud Creek.
