= One Hundred and Two River =

River in Missouri, U.S.

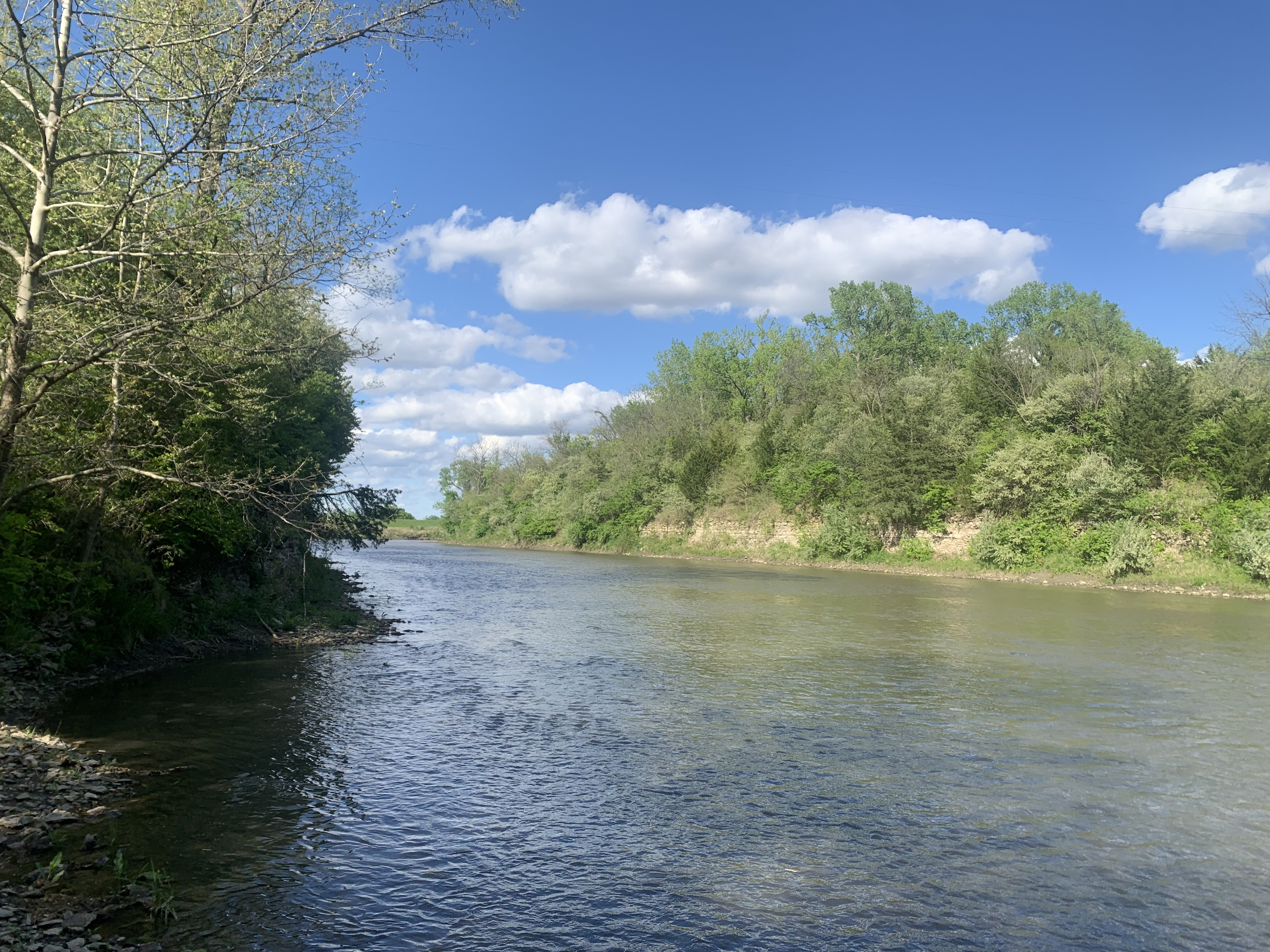
- One Hundred and Two River at Bridgewater Access southwest of Arkoe

Location
- Country: United States
- State: Missouri
- County: Nodaway, Andrew, and Buchanan

Physical characteristics
- Source: Confluence of the West Fork and Middle Fork of the One Hundred and Two River
  - location: Hopkins Township, Nodaway County
  - coordinates: 40°32′16″N 94°50′46″W
  - elevation: 980 ft (300 m)
- Mouth: Platte River
  - location: Washington Township, Buchanan County
  - coordinates: 39°44′27″N 94°43′13″W
  - elevation: 827 ft (252 m)
- Length: 78.6 mi (126.5 km)

Basin features
- Progression: One Hundred and Two River → Platte River → Missouri River → Mississippi River → Atlantic Ocean
- Stream gradient 2.7 ft/mi (0.51 m/km)

One Hundred and Two River is a stream in the northwest portion of the U.S. state of Missouri. It is a major tributary of the Platte River and is 78.6 miles (126.5 km) long.

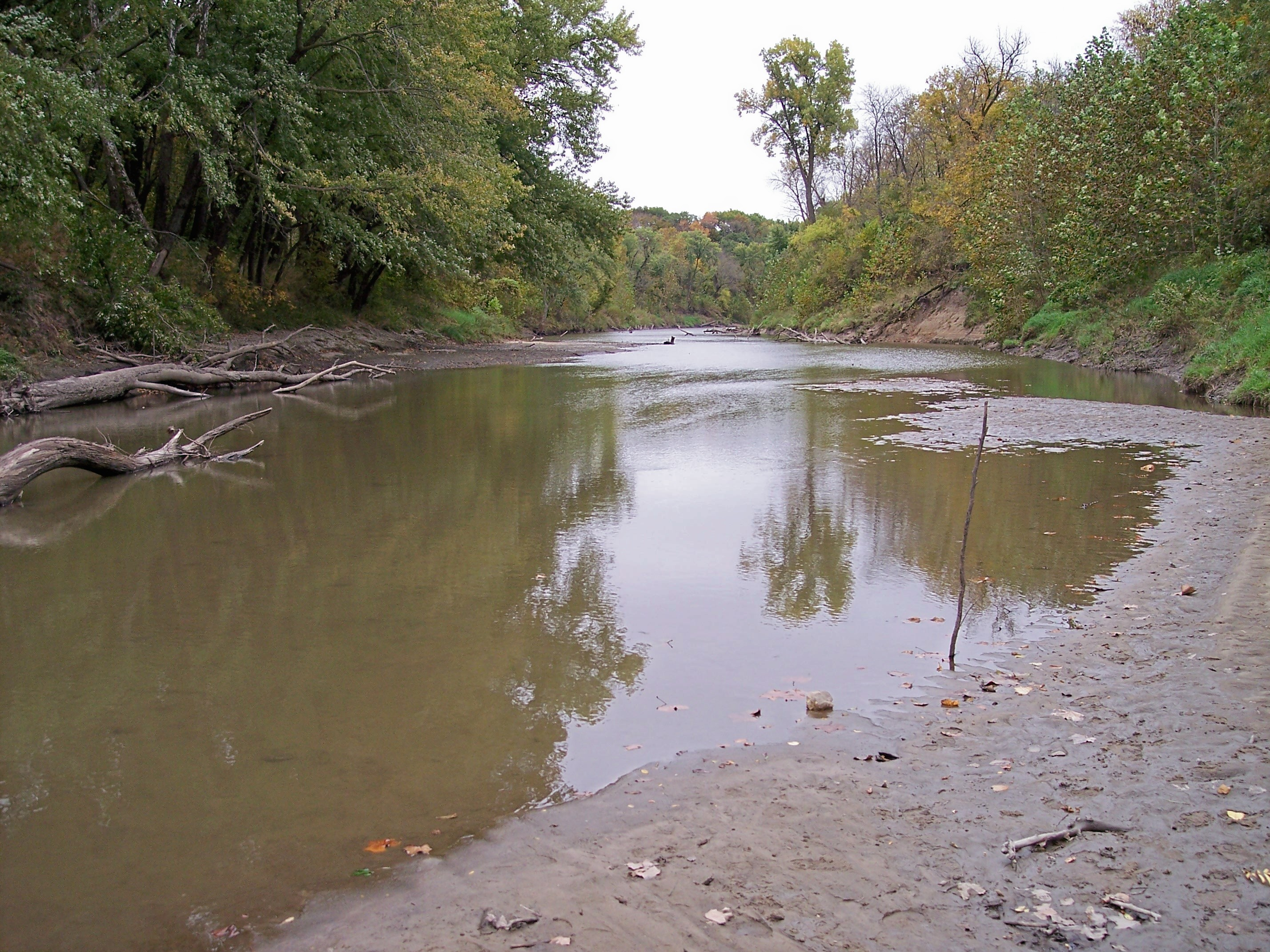
The One Hundred and Two River is near Savannah, Missouri (2006).

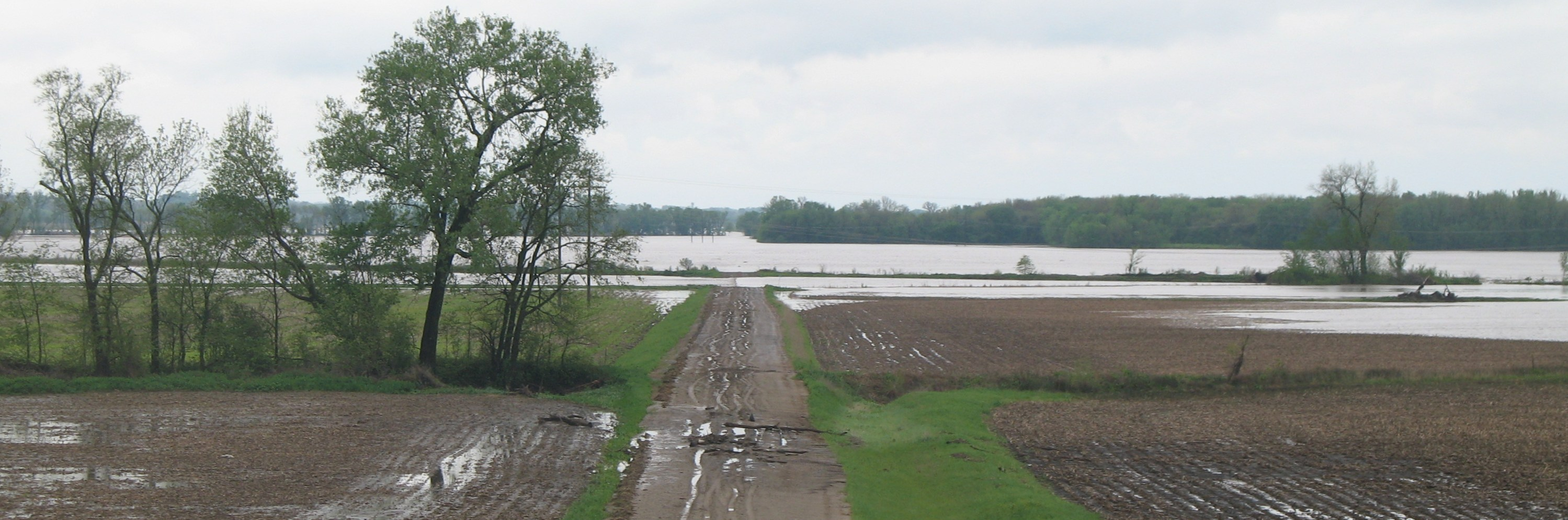
The One Hundred and Two River is east of Maryville, Missouri and flooded from the May 2007 tornado outbreak. The river is on the extreme right. Most of the water pictured is from the flood.

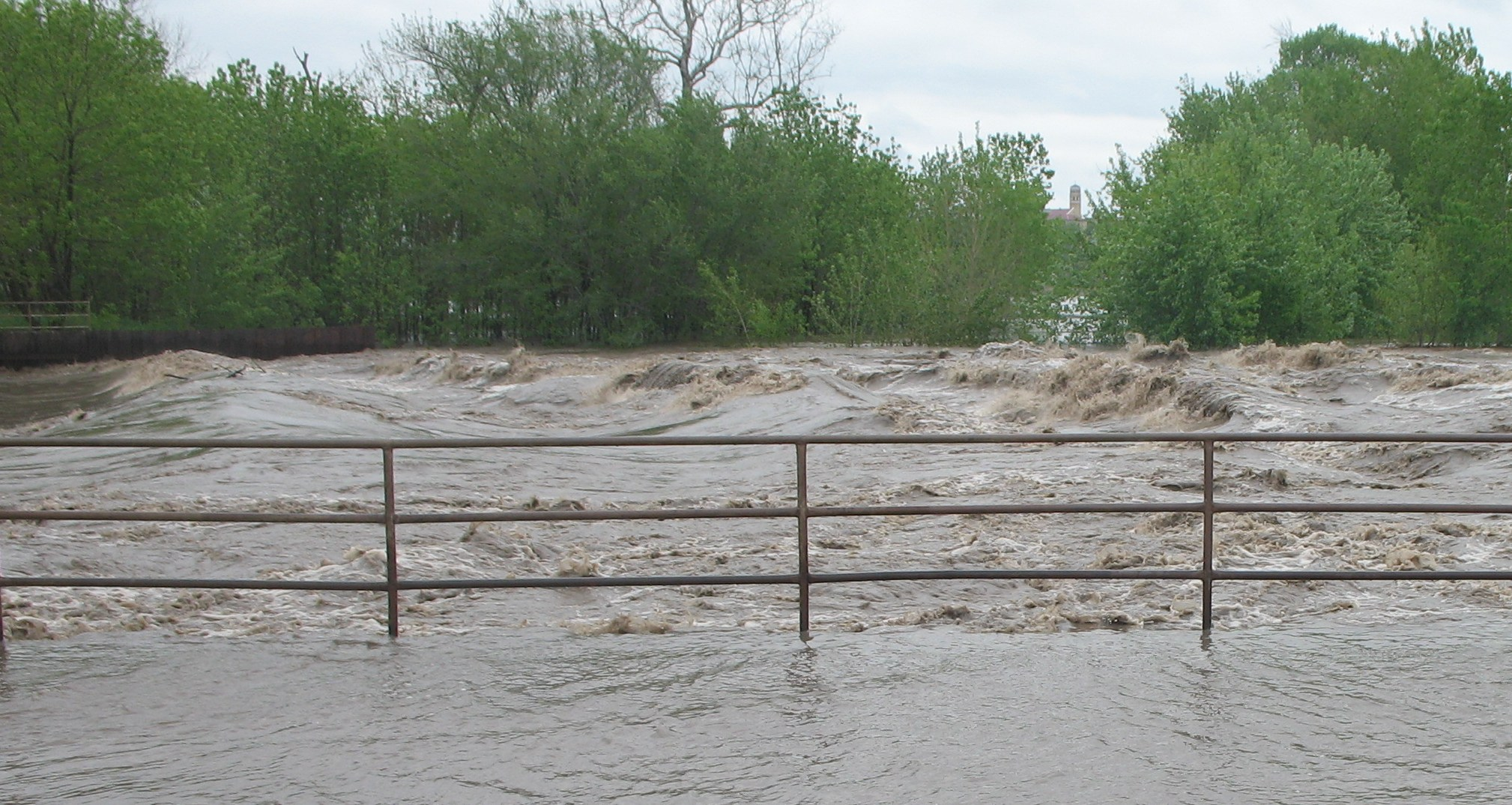
The One Hundred and Two River breached the dam at Maryville during the May 2007 flood.

It flows from source tributaries in southwestern Iowa about 80 miles (130 km) to the Platte. Via the Platte, it is part of the watershed of the Missouri River. Much of the river's course has been straightened and channelized.

According to the Geographic Names Information System, it is also known as the Hundred and Two River, and MoDOT uses 102 River.

According to the National Atlas, the river begins northwest of Hopkins, at the confluence of the East Fork One Hundred and Two River and the Middle Fork One Hundred and Two River. It is joined southwest of Hopkins by the West Fork One Hundred and Two River. All three of the forks originate in Iowa. At Bolckow, the river has a mean annual discharge of 605 cubic feet (17.1 m^{3}) per second.

== Origin of name ==
The beginning point of the Sullivan Line (the Missouri-Iowa border) is near Sheridan, Missouri, and is exactly 100 miles north of the confluence of the Missouri River and Kansas River (north of Kaw Point in Kansas City, Missouri). From that point, the Sullivan Line was surveyed east to the Des Moines River in 1816, and it was extended west in 1836 during the Platte Purchase, when Native American territory was purchased by the federal government and annexed to Missouri. The Sullivan Line was used as the starting point for surveys in western Missouri, and the Missouri portion of the One Hundred and Two River is situated entirely within the Platte Purchase area. The three forks of the river cross the western extension of the Sullivan Line at points between 101 and 102 miles north of the Kansas-Missouri confluence.

Through the years, writers have speculated on etymologies other than the Sullivan Line coordinates:

- Author Homer Croy who chronicled life in Nodaway County speculated that it had something to do with Mormon Trail migration of 1847 in which the river was 102 miles from its previous camp. These coordinates do not fit the coordinates for Mount Pisgah (Iowa) which is less than 100 miles from the river although they would be close in relation to the distance from Hopkins to Kanesville, Iowa which was the outfitting point for the Mormon Trail. Another version of this story says that Brigham Young told his followers that the river was the 102nd they had crossed since leaving Nauvoo.
- Robert L. Ramsay who wrote etymologies for the names of many place names in Missouri speculated it was English translation for the earlier French name Rivière Cent Deux, this in turn being a corruption of the Osage Çondse, meaning 'Upland Forest' (however the traditional area of Osage control was well south of the 102 River).

== Headwaters and course ==
The three forks of the river rise in Iowa:

- The West Fork One Hundred and Two River rises near Corning in Adams County and flows generally southwardly through Taylor County, collecting streams known as the West and Middle Branches of the One Hundred and Two River.
- The Middle Fork One Hundred and Two River rises near Sharpsburg in Taylor County, and flows generally south-southwestardly, past the town of Gravity.
- The East Fork One Hundred and Two River rises near Lenox in Taylor County and flows generally southwestwardly, past the towns of Conway and Bedford.

Each of the forks enters Nodaway County, Missouri, from Taylor County, Iowa, and converge near the town of Hopkins. From this confluence the One Hundred and Two River flows generally southwardly, through Nodaway, Andrew and Buchanan Counties, past the towns of Arkoe, Barnard, Maryville, and Rosendale, in a heavily channelized streambed. It joins the Platte River 6 mi (9.7 km) east of St. Joseph.

== Tributaries ==
=== Nodaway County ===
- East Fork One Hundred and Two River
  - Daugherty Creek
  - Ash Branch
  - Hog Branch
  - East River
- Middle Fork One Hundred and Two River
  - Brushy Creek
- West Fork One Hundred and Two River
  - West Branch One Hundred and Two River
    - Middle Branch One Hundred and Two River
    - Lonzo Creek
    - Willow Creek
  - Rose Branch
- Beard Branch
- Slaughter Branch
- Harmon Creek
  - Drum Creek
- Norvey Creek
- Pinhook Creek
- Canal Branch
- Thill Branch
- Mozingo Creek
  - Long Hollow
- Jones Branch
- Dog Branch
- Upper Neely Branch

=== Andrew County ===
- Long Branch or (North Branch)
  - Bench Creek
  - High Prairie Creek
  - Two Creek
- Kellog Branch
  - Riggin Branch
- Lower Neely Branch (or Neely Nranch)
- White Cloud Creek
  - Mullin Creek
  - Peach Creek
  - Big Slough
  - Theater Creek
  - Pumpkin Center Creek
  - Pond Creek

== See also ==
- Tributaries of the Platte River
- List of Iowa rivers
- List of Missouri rivers
