= Hopkins Township, Nodaway County, Missouri =

Township in Nodaway County, Missouri, U.S.

Hopkins Township
- Township
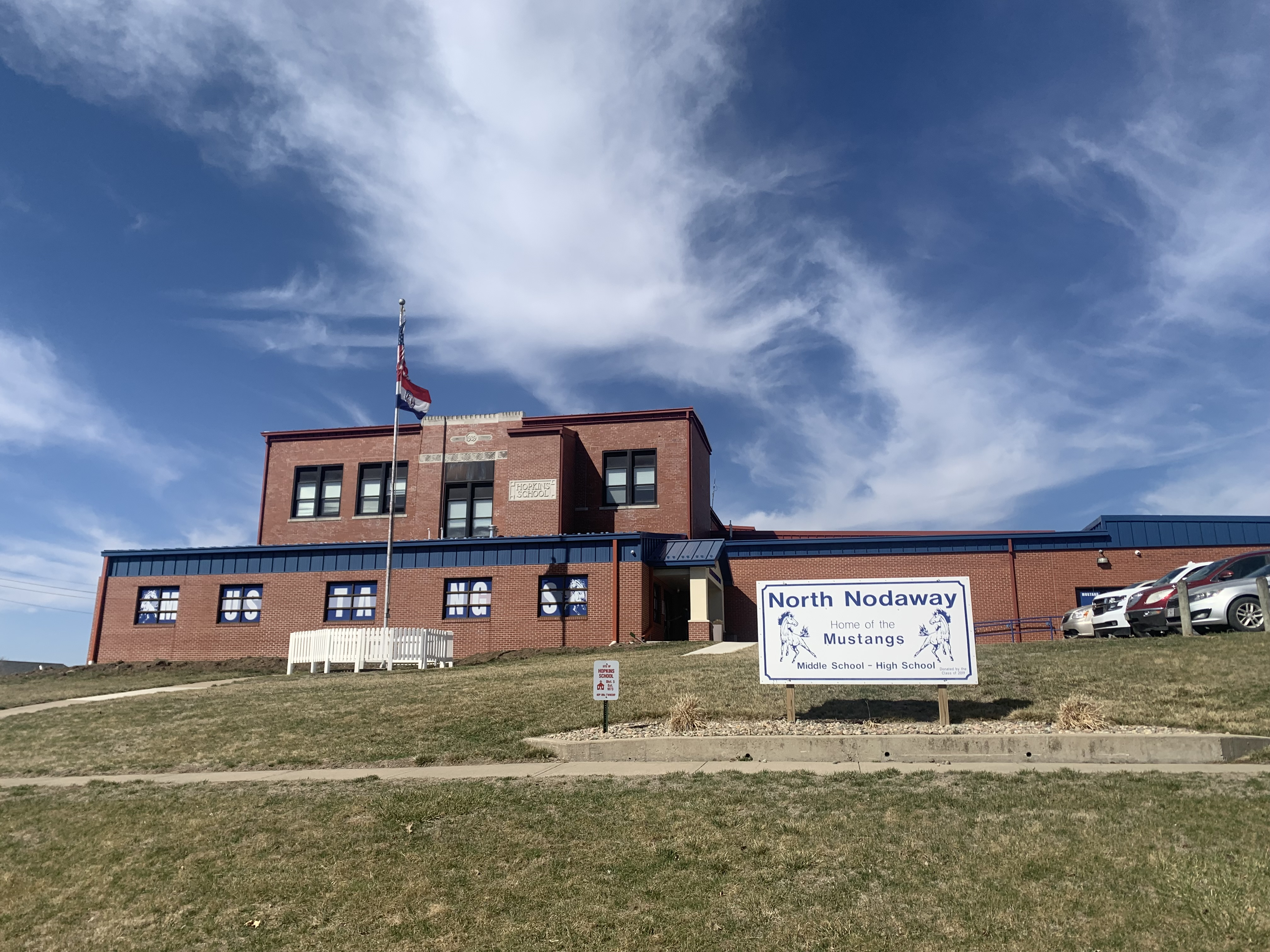
- North Nodaway High School in the city of Hopkins

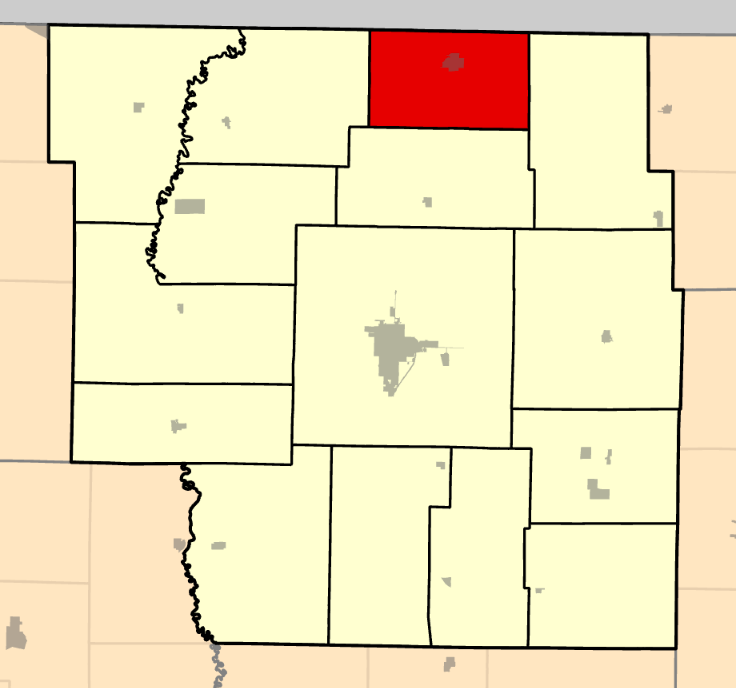
- Coordinates: 40°32′16″N 94°48′50″W
- Country: United States
- State: Missouri
- County: Nodaway
- Erected: 1871

Area
  - Total: 38.72 sq mi (100.3 km^{2})
  - Land: 38.69 sq mi (100.2 km^{2})
  - Water: 0.03 sq mi (0.078 km^{2}) 0.08%
- Elevation: 1,096 ft (334 m)

Population (2020)
  - Total: 645
  - Density: 16.7/sq mi (6.4/km^{2})
- FIPS code: 29-14733022
- GNIS feature ID: 767087

Hopkins Township is a township in Nodaway County, Missouri, United States. At the 2020 census, its population was 645. It contains 40 sections of land.

== Etymology ==
Hopkins Township was established by or before November 7, 1871 and most likely took its name from the town of Hopkins, Missouri. located in the center of the township.

== Geography ==
The One Hundred and Two River flows through the township and its three branches meet in the northern stretches of the township.

== Transportation ==
The following highways travel through the township:

- Route 148
- Route 246
- Route AC
- Route FF
- Route JJ
