= National Register of Historic Places listings in Page County, Iowa =

Location of Page County in Iowa

This is a list of the National Register of Historic Places listings in Page County, Iowa.

This is intended to be a complete list of the properties and districts on the National Register of Historic Places in Page County, Iowa, United States. Latitude and longitude coordinates are provided for many National Register properties and districts; these locations may be seen together in a map.

There are 9 properties and districts listed on the National Register in the county.

This National Park Service list is complete through NPS recent listings posted April 24, 2026.

== Current listings ==
	Name on the Register	Image	Date listed	Location	City or town	Description
1	Clarinda Carnegie Library	Clarinda Carnegie Library	January 15, 2014 (#13001078)	300 N. 16th St. 40°44′26″N 95°02′18″W	Clarinda	
2	Goldenrod Schoolhouse	Goldenrod Schoolhouse	September 23, 1994 (#75000697)	1600 S. 16th St. 40°43′21″N 95°02′14″W	Clarinda	Originally listed in 1975, removed from Register in August 1993 when schoolhouse was relocated. Returned to Register September 23, 1994.
3	Col. William Peters Hepburn House	Col. William Peters Hepburn House	June 4, 1973 (#73000736)	321 W. Lincoln St. 40°44′28″N 95°02′31″W	Clarinda	
4	Iowan's Hotel	Iowan's Hotel	January 29, 2009 (#08001382)	508 E. Railroad St. 40°51′55″N 94°59′09″W	Essex	
5	McCoy Polygonal Barn		June 30, 1986 (#86001469)	Off U.S. Route 71; 40°51′55″N 94°59′09″W	Hepburn	
6	Page County Courthouse	Page County Courthouse	July 2, 1981 (#81000262)	Main St. 40°44′12″N 95°02′13″W	Clarinda	
7	Wabash Combination Depot-Shenandoah	Wabash Combination Depot-Shenandoah	September 6, 1990 (#90001298)	Junction of Ferguson Rd. and Burlington Northern tracks 40°46′20″N 95°22′13″W	Shenandoah	
8	W.T.S. White House and Carriage House	W.T.S. White House and Carriage House	January 21, 1994 (#93001544)	400 N. 16th St. 40°44′29″N 95°02′17″W	Clarinda	
9	Women's Christian Temperance Union Public Fountain	Women's Christian Temperance Union Public Fountain	September 27, 1984 (#84001293)	Clarinda and Sheridan Sts. 40°45′57″N 95°22′19″W	Shenandoah	

== See also ==
- List of National Historic Landmarks in Iowa
- National Register of Historic Places listings in Iowa
- Listings in neighboring counties: Atchison (MO), Fremont, Montgomery, Nodaway (MO), Taylor
