= Tarkio =

Tarkio may refer to:

- Tarkio River, a river that runs through Iowa and Missouri
- Tarkio Township, Page County, Iowa
  - Tarkio City, an extinct hamlet in southern Tarkio Township
- Tarkio Township, Atchison County, Missouri
  - Tarkio, Missouri, a town on the Tarkio River in the northwest corner of Missouri in Tarkio Township
  - Tarkio (album), a 1970 album by the folk-rock duo Brewer & Shipley, named for the city in Missouri
  - Tarkio College, a college no longer in existence in the city of Tarkio, Missouri
- Tarkio, Holt County, Missouri, an extinct hamlet
- Tarkio, a former railroad station located at Forbes, Missouri
- Tarkio, Montana, a small town near Missoula, Montana
  - Tarkio (band), an indie rock group which took its name from the town in Montana
