= Northboro, Iowa =

- City
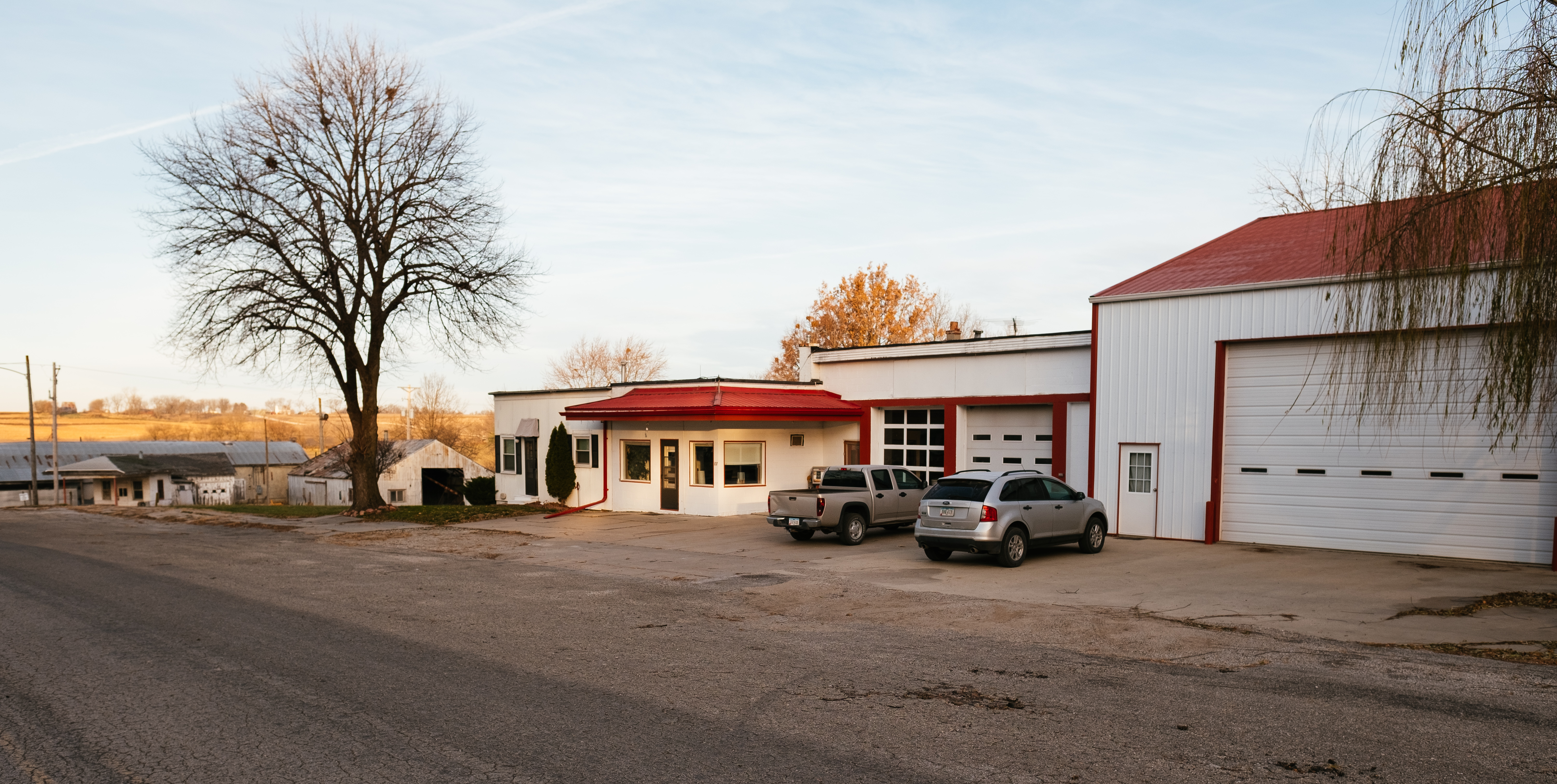
- Looking west down East Broadway

- Location of Northboro, Iowa
- Coordinates: 40°36′26″N 95°17′33″W
- Country: USA
- State: Iowa
- County: Page

Area
  - Total: 0.25 sq mi (0.66 km^{2})
  - Land: 0.25 sq mi (0.66 km^{2})
  - Water: 0 sq mi (0.00 km^{2})
- Elevation: 1,083 ft (330 m)

Population (2020)
  - Total: 52
  - Density: 204.5/sq mi (78.97/km^{2})
- Time zone: UTC-6 (Central (CST))
  - Summer (DST): UTC-5 (CDT)
- ZIP code: 51647
- Area code: 712
- FIPS code: 19-57045
- GNIS feature ID: 2395264

Northboro is a city in Page County, Iowa, United States. The population was 52 at the time of the 2020 census.

== History ==
Northboro was platted in 1881, shortly after the railroad arrived in the neighborhood. It was incorporated on October 14, 1902. It was hit by a large F4 tornado on April 5, 1954, injuring two.

== Geography ==
According to the United States Census Bureau, the city has a total area of 0.26 square miles (0.67 km^{2}), all land.

Northboro is serviced by County Road M44 and the Middle Tarkio Creek passes on its west side. Blanchard is about 4 miles southeast, Coin is about 4.5 miles northeast, and Westboro, Missouri lies about 5 miles south-southwest.

== Demographics ==
Historical populations
Year	Pop.	±%
1910	197	—
1920	228	+15.7%
1930	246	+7.9%
1940	182	−26.0%
1950	167	−8.2%
1960	135	−19.2%
1970	115	−14.8%
1980	115	+0.0%
1990	78	−32.2%
2000	60	−23.1%
2010	58	−3.3%
2020	52	−10.3%
Source:"U.S. Census website". United States Census Bureau. and Iowa Data Center; Source: U.S. Decennial Census

=== 2020 census ===
As of the census of 2020, there were 52 people, 28 households, and 12 families residing in the city. The population density was 204.5 inhabitants per square mile (79.0/km^{2}). There were 35 housing units at an average density of 137.7 per square mile (53.2/km^{2}). The racial makeup of the city was 92.3% White, 0.0% Black or African American, 0.0% Native American, 0.0% Asian, 0.0% Pacific Islander, 3.8% from other races and 3.8% from two or more races. Hispanic or Latino persons of any race comprised 3.8% of the population.

Of the 28 households, 14.3% of which had children under the age of 18 living with them, 35.7% were married couples living together, 3.6% were cohabitating couples, 17.9% had a female householder with no spouse or partner present and 42.9% had a male householder with no spouse or partner present. 57.1% of all households were non-families. 57.1% of all households were made up of individuals, 21.4% had someone living alone who was 65 years old or older.

The median age in the city was 48.5 years. 19.2% of the residents were under the age of 20; 1.9% were between the ages of 20 and 24; 26.9% were from 25 and 44; 25.0% were from 45 and 64; and 26.9% were 65 years of age or older. The gender makeup of the city was 46.2% male and 53.8% female.

=== 2010 census ===
As of the census of 2010, there were 58 people, 25 households, and 17 families living in the city. The population density was 223.1 inhabitants per square mile (86.1/km^{2}). There were 30 housing units at an average density of 115.4 per square mile (44.6/km^{2}). The racial makeup of the city was 100.0% White. Hispanic or Latino of any race were 3.4% of the population.

There were 25 households, of which 20.0% had children under the age of 18 living with them, 60.0% were married couples living together, 8.0% had a female householder with no husband present, and 32.0% were non-families. 28.0% of all households were made up of individuals, and 8% had someone living alone who was 65 years of age or older. The average household size was 2.32 and the average family size was 2.88.

The median age in the city was 46 years. 15.5% of residents were under the age of 18; 7% were between the ages of 18 and 24; 25.8% were from 25 to 44; 41.3% were from 45 to 64; and 10.3% were 65 years of age or older. The gender makeup of the city was 55.2% male and 44.8% female.

=== 2000 census ===
As of the census of 2000, there were 60 people, 25 households, and 19 families living in the city. The population density was 236.0 inhabitants per square mile (91.1/km^{2}). There were 32 housing units at an average density of 125.9 per square mile (48.6/km^{2}). The racial makeup of the city was 98.33% White, and 1.67% from two or more races.

There were 25 households, out of which 28.0% had children under the age of 18 living with them, 68.0% were married couples living together, 8.0% had a female householder with no husband present, and 24.0% were non-families. 24.0% of all households were made up of individuals, and 20.0% had someone living alone who was 65 years of age or older. The average household size was 2.40 and the average family size was 2.79.

15.0% are under the age of 18, 16.7% from 18 to 24, 21.7% from 25 to 44, 25.0% from 45 to 64, and 21.7% who were 65 years of age or older. The median age was 44 years. For every 100 females, there were 100.0 males. For every 100 females age 18 and over, there were 96.2 males.

The median income for a household in the city was $35,536, and the median income for a family was $36,429. Males had a median income of $22,500 versus $25,625 for females. The per capita income for the city was $15,360. There were no families and 1.5% of the population living below the poverty line, including no under eighteens and none of those over 64.

== Education ==
Northboro is within the Shenandoah Community School District.
