= Wabash Trace =

Trail in Iowa, U.S.

Coordinates: 40°52′32″N 95°25′45″W

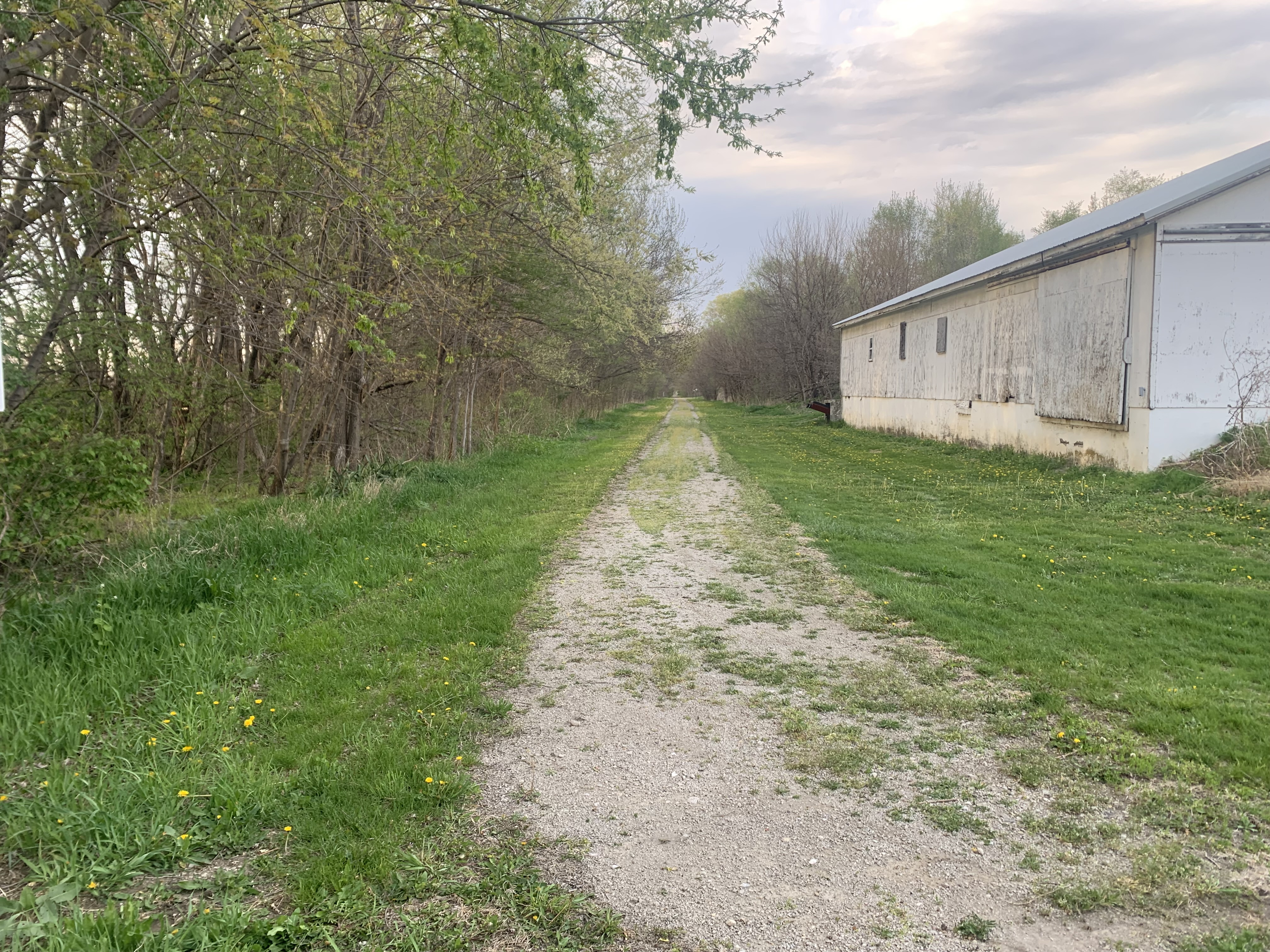
Southern Terminus of Wabash Trace Trail in Blanchard, Iowa

The Wabash Trace Nature Trail is a 63-mile (101 km) rail trail located in Iowa which stretches from the city of Council Bluffs southeast to the city of Blanchard.

== History ==
This rail trail was part of the Wabash Railroad's Omaha to St. Louis rail line. It passes through the towns of Mineola, Silver City, Malvern, Imogene, Shenandoah, Coin and Blanchard. For most of the trail's course, a thin line of trees and bushes parallels the trail. It follows streams such as Silver Creek, Four Mile Creek, Tarkio Creek, and the Tarkio River. The grade is a very gentle one, which is downhill as one pedals northwestward to Council Bluffs. From Silver City northward, one can coast most of the way.

== Highlights ==
Two miles south of the Council Bluffs trailhead, the Wabash Trace crosses Pony Creek on a long, curving bridge. At the crossing of the West Nishnabotna River there are ruined boxcars lying in the river bed, some of them with wooden sides—remnants of a derailment that occurred in the 1960s. Heading south out of Shenandoah (the largest intermediate town) the path follows the rocky ravine of Fourmile Creek. The trail ends at Blanchard, close by a tiny service station that straddles the state line.

There are no bicycle repair shops along the way, but there is a nice shop in Silver City which sells basic repair spare parts and provisions, and allows for self repairs. Shenandoah does have a discount store that sells new bicycles. The town also has a motel, B&B's and eateries, such as The Depot restaurant and brew-pub, open daily at 6 am. Coin and Mineola have very small trail side parks. Shenandoah has a somewhat larger one, Waubonsie Park. There are portable toilets located in Council Bluffs and Mineola and Silver City. The park in Coin has a shower and electricity and allows tent camping for a small fee. There are parks in Malvern and Shenandoah with free camping.

The small Irish Catholic town of Imogene has a quaint restaurant and bar, The Emerald Isle, in addition to a Catholic church, St. Patrick's. It also has a campsite with showers and restrooms available for a fee.
