= Clarinda Community School District =

School district in Iowa, United States

Coordinates: 40.742827°N 95.033191°W

Location
- Clarinda, Iowa Page and Taylor counties United States
- Coordinates: 40.742827, -95.033191

District information
- Type: Local school district
- Motto: Building a Foundation for Success
- Grades: K-12
- Superintendent: Jeff Privia
- Schools: 4
- Budget: $15,178,000 (2020-21)
- NCES District ID: 1931680

Students and staff
- Students: 1062 (2022-23)
- Teachers: 75.66 FTE
- Staff: 83.70 FTE
- Student–teacher ratio: 14.04
- Athletic conference: Hawkeye 10
- District mascot: Cardinals
- Colors: Dark Red and Black

Other information
- Website: www.clarinda.k12.ia.us

Clarinda Community School District is a rural public school district headquartered in Clarinda, Iowa, United States. The district, in sections of Page and Taylor counties, serves Clarinda, Hepburn, Yorktown, and sections of New Market.

== History ==
On July 1, 2008, the New Market Community School District was dissolved; portions went to the Clarinda district.

In 1953 the districts junior high school was condemned. The school year was finished in multiple churches throughout town. A new Junior high was built on the south end of town, named after former president James Garfield. For many years the district operated Lincoln elementary ( built 1923) and McKinley elementary ( built 1955). When the school district built a new senior high school on the west edge of town in 1969, the 1922 High school building became the junior high school (grades 7–9), and Garfield junior High became Garfield elementary. In 1992, facing budget cuts and ADA compliance issues, the district voted to close Lincoln elementary. The district restructured the grade levels with K-2 at Garfield Elementary, 3–5 at McKinley, 6–8 at the middle school and 9–12 at the Senior High school. By 1996 the school district was struggling with decreasing enrollment, and outdated facilities. The high school was overcrowded with the addition of New Market high school students, and the freshman class to the senior high school. A bond issue to expand Garfield elementary into a Pk-8 facility, and add onto the high school passed overwhelmingly. Students moved into the new facilities in the fall of 1998. The old 1923 middle school was demolished and a new library erected on the site, McKinley elementary became the home of the districts central office and alternative school. In 2020 facing overcrowding at the Pk-8 building, the district decided to move the 7th and 8th grades to the high school adopting a Jr/Sr High school model. Space issues remained an issue and following two failed bond issues the district decided to utilize SAVE dollars to construct an addition onto the Jr/Sr high school. The addition is set to open in the fall of 2025.

The district engaged in whole grade sharing with the [South Page Community School District] in 2024 for grades 7–12. The district also began sharing the services of Jeff Privia as superintendent at that time.

Superintendents over the years have been: William Anderson 1958-1961, Robert Looft 1961-1964, Jerald Blasi 1964-1970,Guy Carter 1970-1975, Clarence Lippert 1975-1991, Paul Sellon 1991-1993, James Poole 1993-1995, Paul Honnold 1995-2016, Deron Stender 2016-2019, Chris Bergman 2019-2022, and Jeff Privia 2022- Present

== Schools ==
- Clarinda Junior/Senior High school
- Garfield Elementary School

== Clarinda High School ==
=== Athletics ===
The Cardinals compete in the Hawkeye 10 Conference in the following sports:

==== Fall Sports ====
- Football
- Cross Country (boys and girls)
  - Boys' - 3-time State Champions (1956, 1962, 1963)
- Volleyball

==== Winter Sports ====
- Basketball (boys and girls)
- Bowling
- Wrestling
  - 1994 Class 2A State Champions

==== Spring Sports ====
- Golf (boys and girls)
  - Girls' - 1999 Class 2A State Champions
- Tennis (boys and girls)
- Track and Field (boys and girls)
  - Boys' - 1956 Class A State Champions

==== Summer Sports ====
- Baseball
- Softball

== See also ==
- List of school districts in Iowa
- List of high schools in Iowa
