= Page County Courthouse =

Page County Courthouse may refer to:

- Page County Courthouse (Iowa), Clarinda, Iowa
- Page County Courthouse (Virginia), Luray, Virginia
