= Tarkio Township =

Tarkio Township may refer to the following townships in the United States:

- Tarkio Township, Page County, Iowa
- Tarkio Township, Atchison County, Missouri
