= Nebraska Township, Page County, Iowa =

Township in Page County, Iowa, U.S.

Coordinates: 40°46′25″N 94°57′18″W

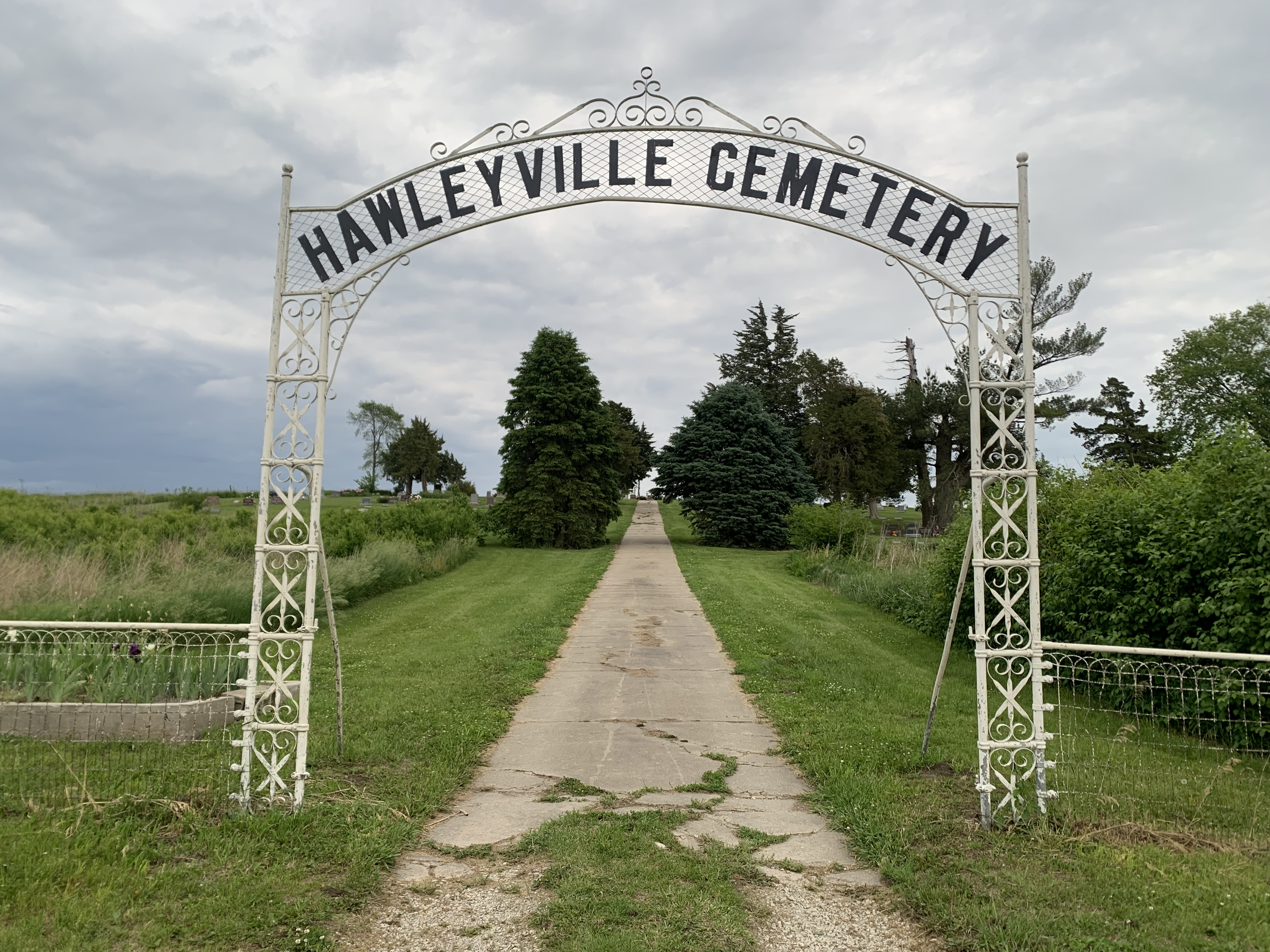
Hawleyville Cemetery in Nebraska Township, the former settlement of Hawleyville was located here.

Nebraska Township is a township in Page County, Iowa, United States.

== History ==
Nebraska Township (Township 69, Range 36) was surveyed in November 1851 by Wm. Dunn and was established in 1858.
