= Valley Township, Page County, Iowa =

Township in Page County, Iowa, U.S.

Coordinates: 40°51′25″N 94°59′10″W

Valley Township is a township in Page County, Iowa, United States.

== History ==
Valley Township (Township 70, Range 36) was surveyed in November 1851 by Wm. Dunn. It was named after the Nodaway River valley, which was covered with valuable timber at the time of settlement.
