= Goldenrod Schoolhouse =

Schoolhouse in Iowa, U.S.

- U.S. National Register of Historic Places
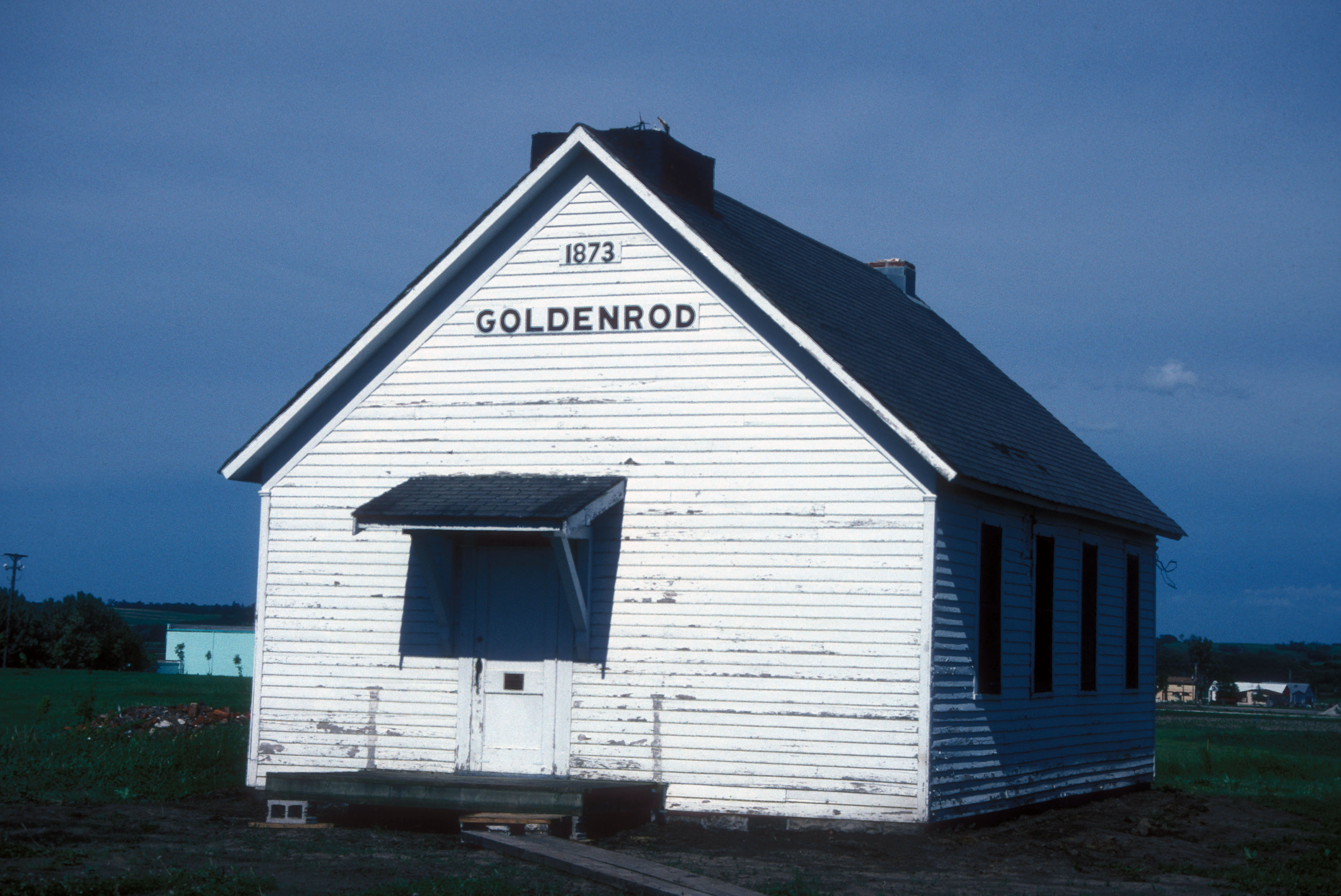

- Location within Iowa Location within the United States
- Location: 1600 S. 16th St. Clarinda, Iowa
- Coordinates: 40°43′19″N 95°02′14.25″W
- Area: less than one acre
- Built: 1873
- NRHP reference No.: 75000697
- Added to NRHP: September 23, 1994

The Goldenrod Schoolhouse is a historic building located in Clarinda, Iowa, United States. The 23-by-33-foot (7.0 by 10.1 m) one-room school was built in Fremont Township, northern Page County, in 1873. Jessie Field taught in the school at the turn of the 20th century. She initiated a school program here in March 1901 that eventually developed into the 4-H organization. The building served as part of the Page County rural school system until 1960. It was slated for demolition when it was saved and moved to the Page County Fairgrounds in Clarinda in 1965. It was near to the place that Jessie Field had held the first Boys Farm Camp and Camp of the Golden Maids in 1910 and 1911. The former school building was originally listed on the National Register of Historic Places in 1975.

The land the old schoolhouse was located on was quite low and flooding and drainage had become a problem. Changes in the city's water system would have affected the area. The Nodaway Valley Historical Society had created a museum with a display of rural schools and the beginnings of 4-H near the fairgrounds. The Goldenrod Schoolhouse was moved to the museum in January 1993. Because of the move it was removed from the National Register in August 1993, and it was returned again the following year.
