= Fremont Township, Page County, Iowa =

Township in Iowa, USA

Coordinates: 40°51′N 95°13′W

Fremont Township is a township in Page County, Iowa, United States.

Fremont Township (Township 70, Range 38) was surveyed in June 1852 by Thomas Evans.
