= Colfax Township, Page County, Iowa =

Township in Page County, Iowa, US

Coordinates: 40°36′59″N 95°12′07″W

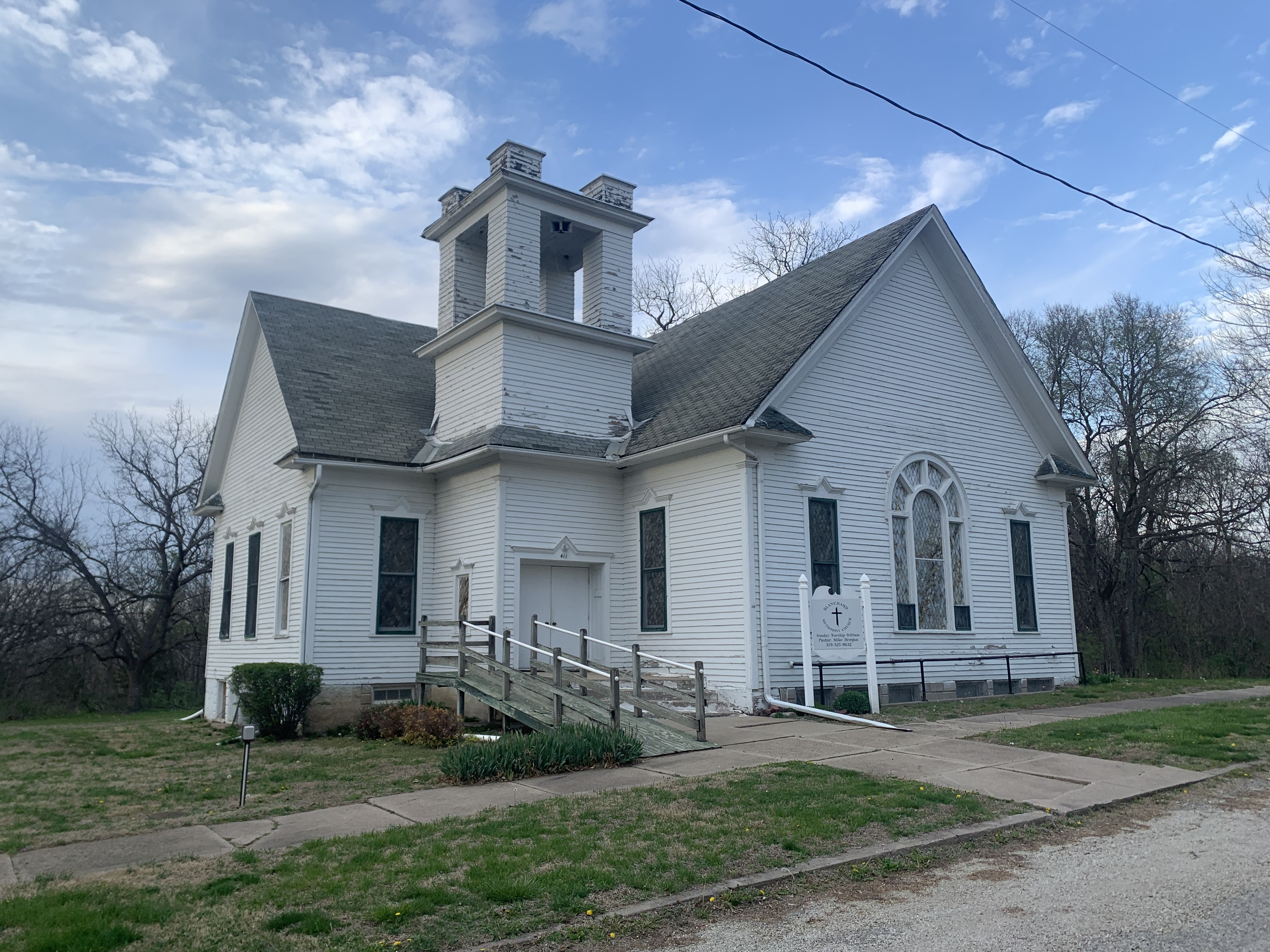
Blanchard Methodist Church in southern Colfax Township.

Colfax Township is a township in Page County, Iowa, United States.

== History ==
Colfax Township (Township 67, Range 38) was surveyed in June 1852 by William Shields. It is named for Schuyler Colfax. A small unincorporated hamlet in the southwest corner of this township known as Willsburg existed in sometime during the mid to late 19th Century.
