= Lincoln Township, Page County, Iowa =

Township in Page County, Iowa, U.S.

Coordinates: 40°41′28″N 95°12′04″W

Lincoln Township is a township in Page County, Iowa, United States.

== History ==
Lincoln Township (Township 68, Range 38) was surveyed in June 1852 by A. Carpenter and was established in 1858. There was also a small rural hamlet called Snow Hill that was located in the southwestern portion of Lincoln Township just along the Tarkio River.
