= Washington Township, Page County, Iowa =

Township in Page County, Iowa, U.S.

Coordinates: 40°37′01″N 95°18′58″W

Washington Township is a township in Page County, Iowa, United States and has a population of 195.

== History ==
Washington Township (Township 67, Range 39) was the first township surveyed in the county, being completed in December 1845 by Warren Reed. It was established in 1858.
