= Shenandoah station =

Rail station in Iowa, U.S.

- Wabash Combination Depot-Shenandoah
- U.S. National Register of Historic Places
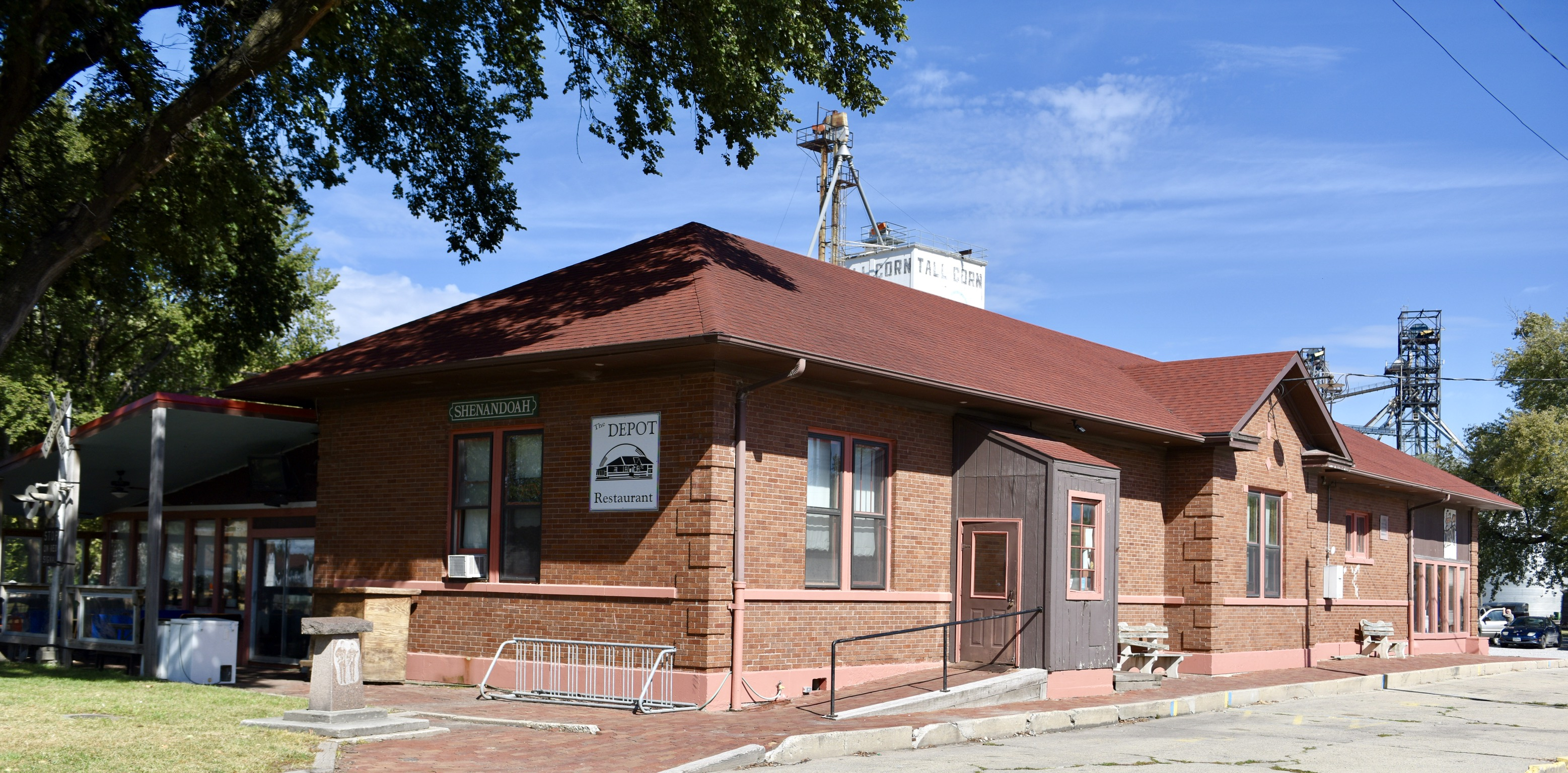

- Location within Iowa Location within the United States
- Location: Junction of Ferguson Rd. and Burlington Northern tracks, Shenandoah, Iowa
- Coordinates: 40°46′20″N 95°22′14″W
- Area: less than one acre
- Built: 1903
- Architect: Wabash Railroad
- Architectural style: Queen Anne; Stick-Eastlake
- MPS: Advent & Development of Railroads in Iowa MPS
- NRHP reference No.: 90001298
- Added to NRHP: September 6, 1990

Shenandoah station, is a former train station in Shenandoah, Iowa, United States. The depot was built in 1903, and replaced a smaller and older structure. It was designed by and served the Wabash Railroad as a combination passenger and freight station. The Queen Anne and Stick-Eastlake style station was a standard design used by the railroad. The single-story, frame structure features a gabled roof and wide, overhanging eaves. It was an island station that sat in the midst of the tracks. The rear track was used for loading and unloading freight, while the main line rails were along the front. The depot was acquired by the Wabash Trace Nature Trail from the Iowa Southern Railway. The Wabash Trace relocated it to Sportsman's Park in Shenandoah, along the Burlington Northern tracks. The depot was listed on the National Register of Historic Places in 1990.

Preceding station	Wabash Railroad	Following station
Council Bluffs toward Omaha	Omaha – St. Louis	Burlington Junction toward St. Louis
