= Morton Township, Page County, Iowa =

Township in Page County, Iowa, U.S.

Coordinates: 40°41′31″N 95°18′54″W

Morton Township is a township in Page County, Iowa, United States.

== History ==
Morton Township (Township 68, Range 39) was surveyed in November 1851 by John S. Shiller and was established in 1858.
