= Coin, Iowa =

- City
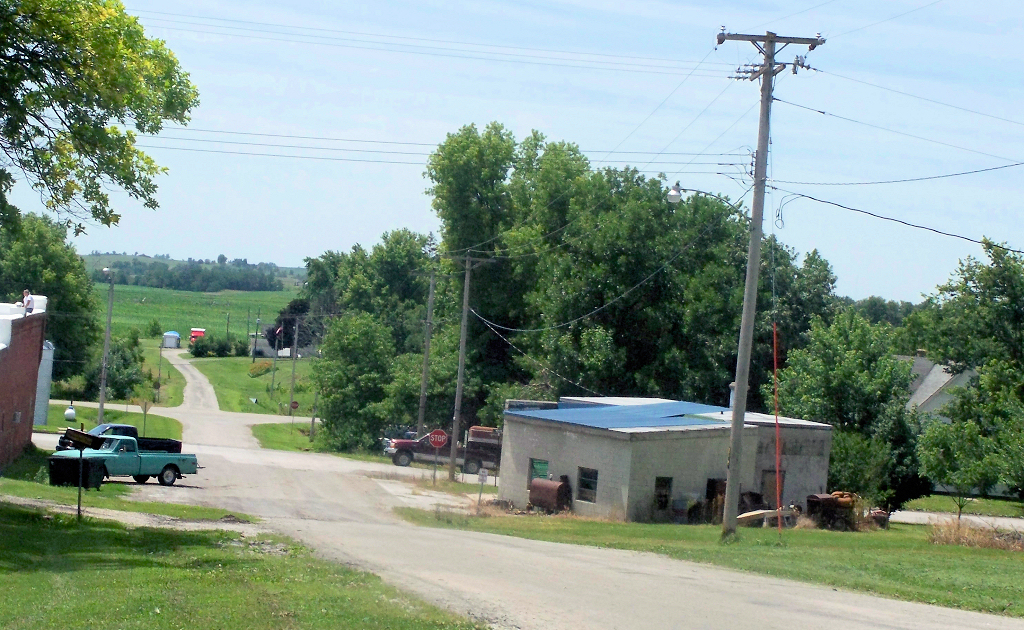
- Street in Coin

- Location of Coin, Iowa
- Coordinates: 40°39′21″N 95°14′06″W
- Country: USA
- State: Iowa
- County: Page

Area
  - Total: 0.90 sq mi (2.32 km^{2})
  - Land: 0.90 sq mi (2.32 km^{2})
  - Water: 0 sq mi (0.00 km^{2})
- Elevation: 1,030 ft (310 m)

Population (2020)
  - Total: 176
  - Density: 196.9/sq mi (76.02/km^{2})
- Time zone: UTC-6 (Central (CST))
  - Summer (DST): UTC-5 (CDT)
- ZIP code: 51636
- Area code: 712
- FIPS code: 19-14970
- GNIS feature ID: 2393587

Coin is a city in Page County, Iowa, United States. The population was 176 at the time of the 2020 census. The Wabash Trace—a railroad converted to a bicycle trail—passes through here.

== History ==
Coin was platted in 1879, on the Chicago, Burlington and Quincy Railroad line; it was a mile south of Snow Hill and on the opposite bank of the river. The origin of the name "Coin" is obscure.

== Notable people ==
- Charles Roy Henderson (1911–1989), statistician and a pioneer of animal breeding, was born in Coin

== Geography ==
Coin is located along the Tarkio River.

According to the United States Census Bureau, the city has a total area of 0.80 square miles (2.07 km^{2}), all of which is land.

== Demographics ==
Historical populations
Year	Pop.	±%
1880	772	—
1900	574	−25.6%
1910	591	+3.0%
1920	603	+2.0%
1930	536	−11.1%
1940	457	−14.7%
1950	407	−10.9%
1960	346	−15.0%
1970	294	−15.0%
1980	316	+7.5%
1990	278	−12.0%
2000	252	−9.4%
2010	193	−23.4%
2020	176	−8.8%
Source:"U.S. Census website". United States Census Bureau. and Iowa Data Center; Source: U.S. Decennial Census

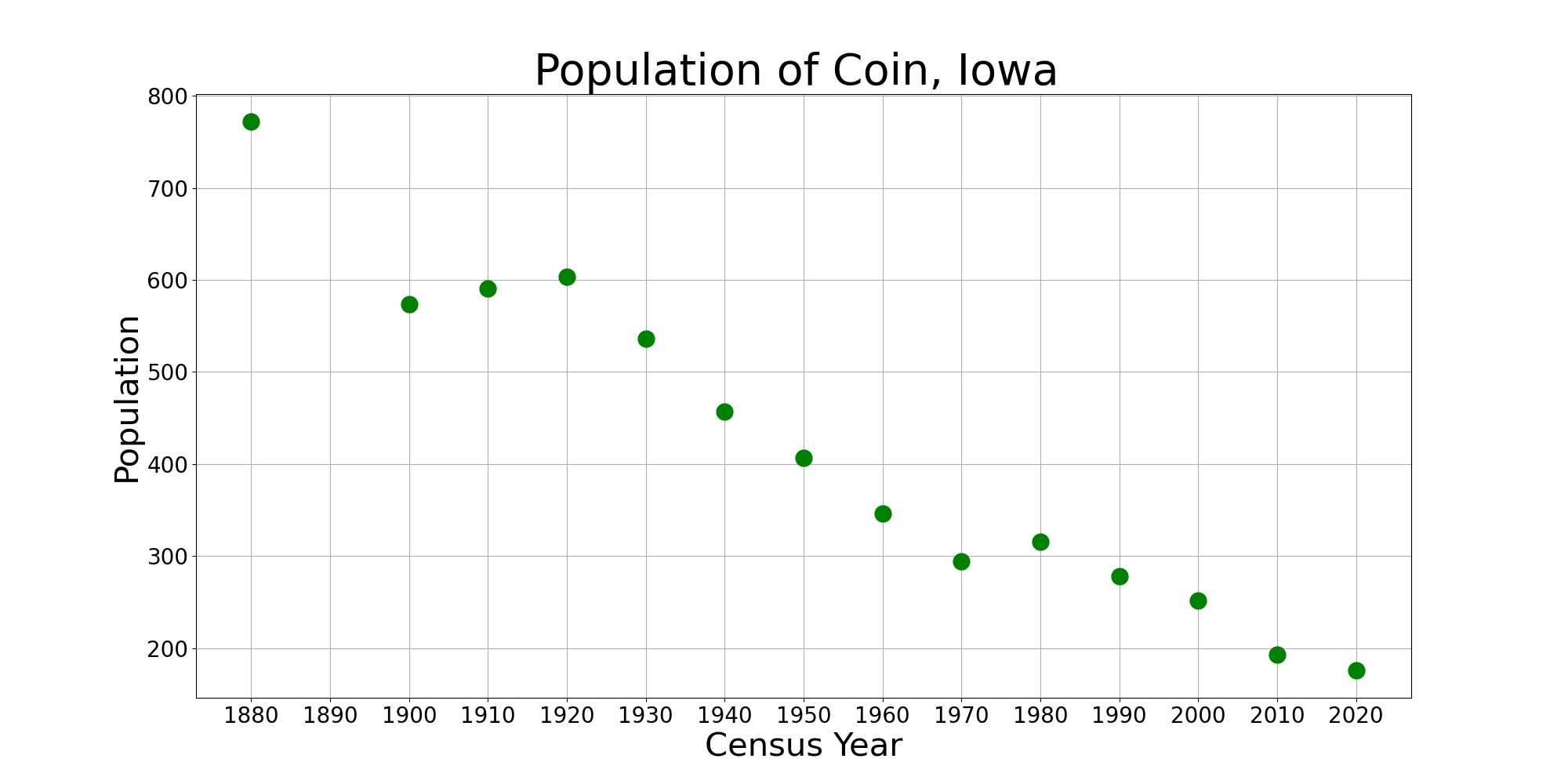
The population of Coin, Iowa from US census data

=== 2020 census ===
As of the census of 2020, there were 176 people, 76 households, and 47 families residing in the city. The population density was 196.9 inhabitants per square mile (76.0/km^{2}). There were 91 housing units at an average density of 101.8 per square mile (39.3/km^{2}). The racial makeup of the city was 90.3% White, 0.6% Black or African American, 0.0% Native American, 0.0% Asian, 0.0% Pacific Islander, 0.6% from other races and 8.5% from two or more races. Hispanic or Latino persons of any race comprised 0.6% of the population.

Of the 76 households, 26.3% of which had children under the age of 18 living with them, 42.1% were married couples living together, 13.2% were cohabitating couples, 27.6% had a female householder with no spouse or partner present and 17.1% had a male householder with no spouse or partner present. 38.2% of all households were non-families. 31.6% of all households were made up of individuals, 18.4% had someone living alone who was 65 years old or older.

The median age in the city was 47.8 years. 24.4% of the residents were under the age of 20; 2.3% were between the ages of 20 and 24; 20.5% were from 25 and 44; 25.0% were from 45 and 64; and 27.8% were 65 years of age or older. The gender makeup of the city was 44.3% male and 55.7% female.

=== 2010 census ===
As of the census of 2010, there were 193 people, 79 households, and 56 families living in the city. The population density was 241.3 inhabitants per square mile (93.2/km^{2}). There were 99 housing units at an average density of 123.8 per square mile (47.8/km^{2}). The racial makeup of the city was 94.3% White and 5.7% from two or more races. Hispanic or Latino of any race were 7.3% of the population.

There were 79 households, of which 27.8% had children under the age of 18 living with them, 49.4% were married couples living together, 13.9% had a female householder with no husband present, 7.6% had a male householder with no wife present, and 29.1% were non-families. 22.8% of all households were made up of individuals, and 8.8% had someone living alone who was 65 years of age or older. The average household size was 2.44 and the average family size was 2.86.

The median age in the city was 44.5 years. 26.4% of residents were under the age of 18; 4.7% were between the ages of 18 and 24; 19.2% were from 25 to 44; 31.2% were from 45 to 64; and 18.7% were 65 years of age or older. The gender makeup of the city was 48.7% male and 51.3% female.

=== 2000 census ===
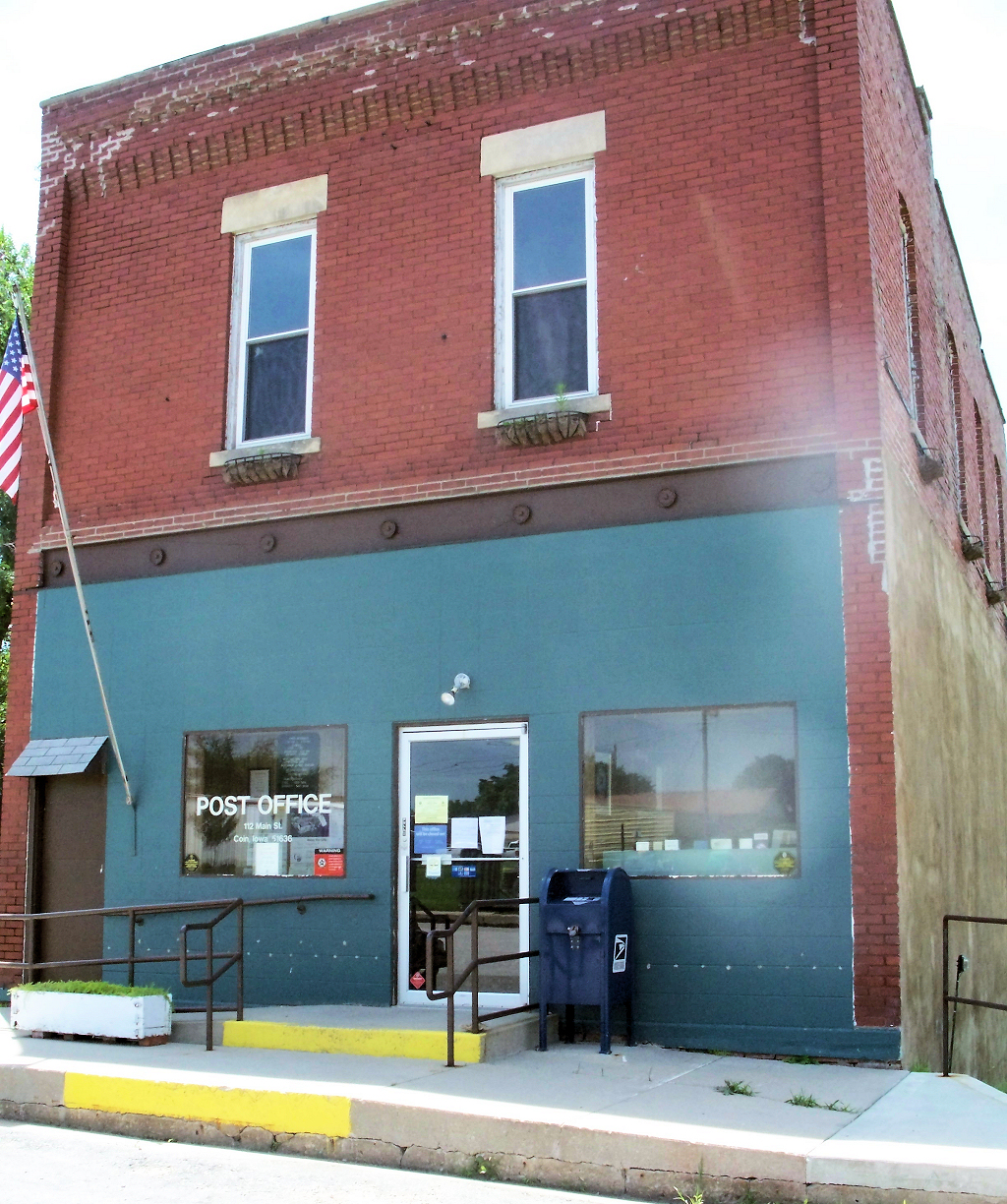
Coin Post Office

As of the census of 2000, there were 252 people, 102 households, and 68 families living in the city. The population density was 314.4 inhabitants per square mile (121.4/km^{2}). There were 118 housing units at an average density of 147.2 per square mile (56.8/km^{2}). The racial makeup of the city was 99.60% White, and 0.40% from two or more races. Hispanic or Latino of any race were 0.79% of the population.

There were 102 households, out of which 35.3% had children under the age of 18 living with them, 53.9% were married couples living together, 8.8% had a female householder with no husband present, and 32.4% were non-families. 31.4% of all households were made up of individuals, and 15.7% had someone living alone who was 65 years of age or older. The average household size was 2.47 and the average family size was 3.03.

26.6% are under the age of 18, 7.5% from 18 to 24, 24.6% from 25 to 44, 22.6% from 45 to 64, and 18.7% who were 65 years of age or older. The median age was 39 years. For every 100 females, there were 92.4 males. For every 100 females age 18 and over, there were 98.9 males.

The median income for a household in the city was $33,500, and the median income for a family was $45,313. Males had a median income of $30,250 versus $24,500 for females. The per capita income for the city was $16,080. About 3.1% of families and 7.5% of the population were below the poverty line, including 3.8% of those under the age of eighteen and 17.0% of those 65 or over.

== Education ==
It is in the South Page Community School District.
