= William P. Hepburn House =

Historic house in Iowa, United States

- U.S. National Register of Historic Places
- U.S. National Historic Landmark
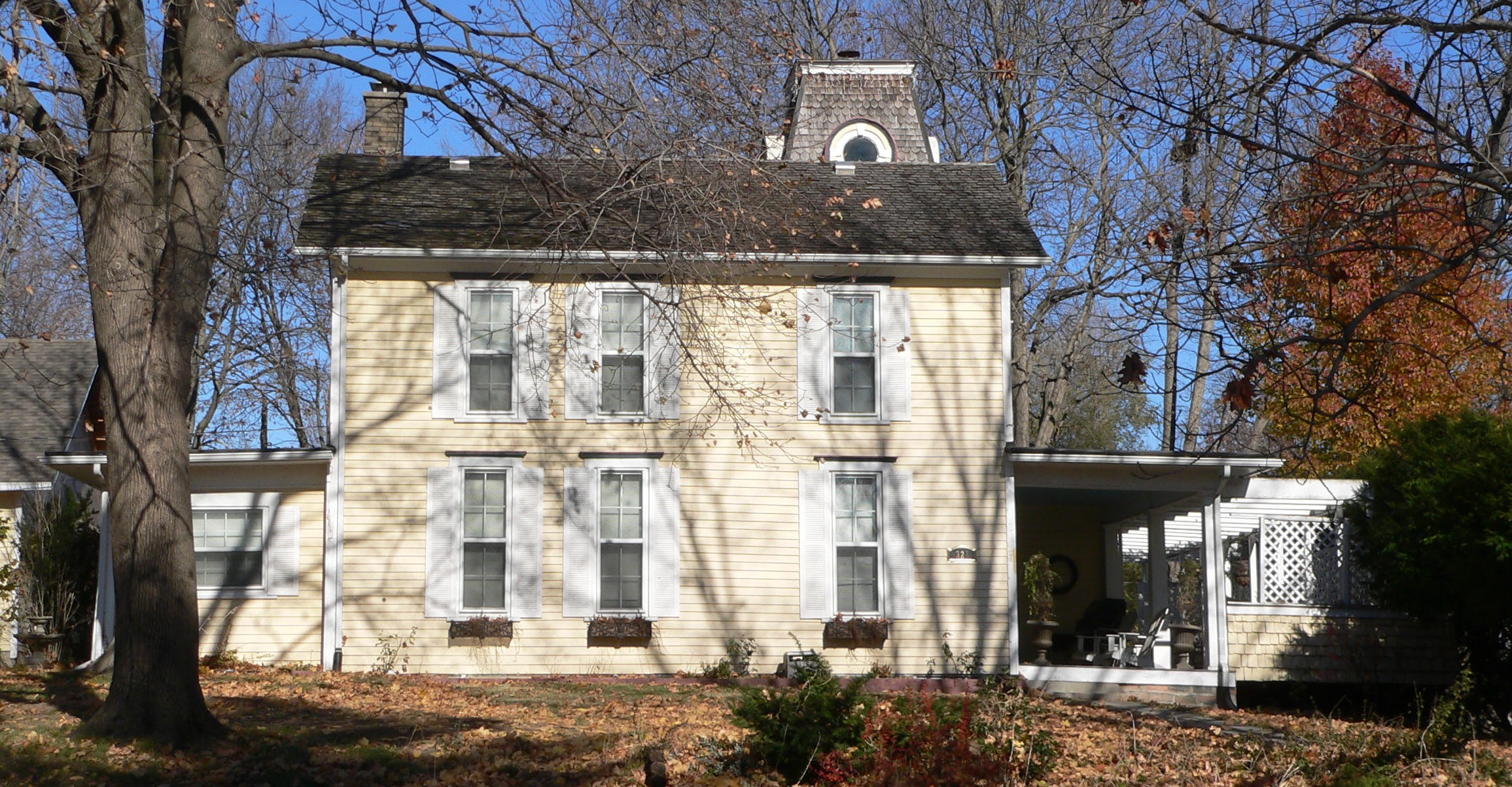
- Hepburn house, seen from Lincoln Street

- Location within Iowa Location within the United States
- Location: 321 W. Lincoln St. Clarinda, Iowa
- Coordinates: 40°44′30″N 95°2′30.5″W
- Built: 1867
- NRHP reference No.: 73000736

Significant dates
- Added to NRHP: June 4, 1973
- Designated NHL: December 8, 1976

The William P. Hepburn House is a historic house and National Historic Landmark in Clarinda, Iowa. It was home to United States Congressman William P. Hepburn (1833–1916) from about 1867 until his death. Hepburn most significantly introduced the Hepburn Act of 1906, which gave the Federal government the power to set railroad rates, and was an important precedent in Federal regulation of private industry. The house was declared a National Historic Landmark in 1976. It is a private residence, not generally open to the public.

== Description and history ==
The Hepburn house is located in a residential area west of downtown Clarinda, at the northeast corner of West Lincoln and North 19th Streets. The house stands at the top of a rise from which Hepburn would have had a view of the city's downtown, but it is now hemmed in by trees and residential development. The house is a 2 1/2-story wood-frame structure, roughly L-shaped, with a cross-gable roof, clapboard siding, and a brick foundation. Extending north along the eastern facade (the main facade of the building) is a flat-roof veranda, and there is a mansard-roofed tower located at the crook of the L.

The house was from 1867 until his death in 1916 the primary residence of William P. Hepburn, and the best-preserved of two residences associated with his political life (the other is a townhouse in Washington, DC). Hepburn, trained as a lawyer and a veteran of the American Civil War, served as member of the United States House of Representatives 1880–1886 and 1892–1908. During the second period he chaired the House Committee on Interstate and Foreign Commerce, and was instrumental in the passage of what became known as the Hepburn Act, groundbreaking legislation that greatly expanded the authority of the Interstate Commerce Commission, especially with regard to railroad rates and fiscal oversight. He also played an important role in authorizing construction of the Panama Canal, and sought to curb the power of the Speaker of the House Joseph G. Cannon.

== See also ==
- List of National Historic Landmarks in Iowa
- National Register of Historic Places listings in Page County, Iowa
