= McCoy Polygonal Barn =

Historic structure in Iowa, U.S.

- U.S. National Register of Historic Places
- Location within Iowa Location within the United States
- Location: Off U.S. Route 71; Hepburn, Iowa
- Coordinates: 40°51′54.1″N 94°59′11.2″W
- Area: less than one acre
- Built: 1914
- MPS: Iowa Round Barns: The Sixty Year Experiment TR
- NRHP reference No.: 86001469
- Added to NRHP: June 30, 1986

The McCoy Polygonal Barn is a historic building located near Hepburn in rural Page County, Iowa, United States. It was built in 1914 as a hog sale barn. The hexagon-shaped building features white horizontal siding, a large monitor with 12 windows, and an aerator. It is only one of five barns known to have been built on a farm in Iowa with a large monitor. Because of this building's original use as a sale barn it was needed to provide the required amount of light. The barn has been listed on the National Register of Historic Places since 1986.
