= East River Township, Page County, Iowa =

Township in Page County, Iowa, U.S.

Coordinates: 40°41′17″N 94°58′08″W

East River Township is a township in Page County, Iowa, United States.

== History ==
East River Township (Township 68, Range 36) was surveyed in June 1852 by A. Carpenter and was named after the East Nodaway River.
