= Harlan Township, Page County, Iowa =

Township in Iowa, USA

Coordinates: 40°41′N 95°05′W

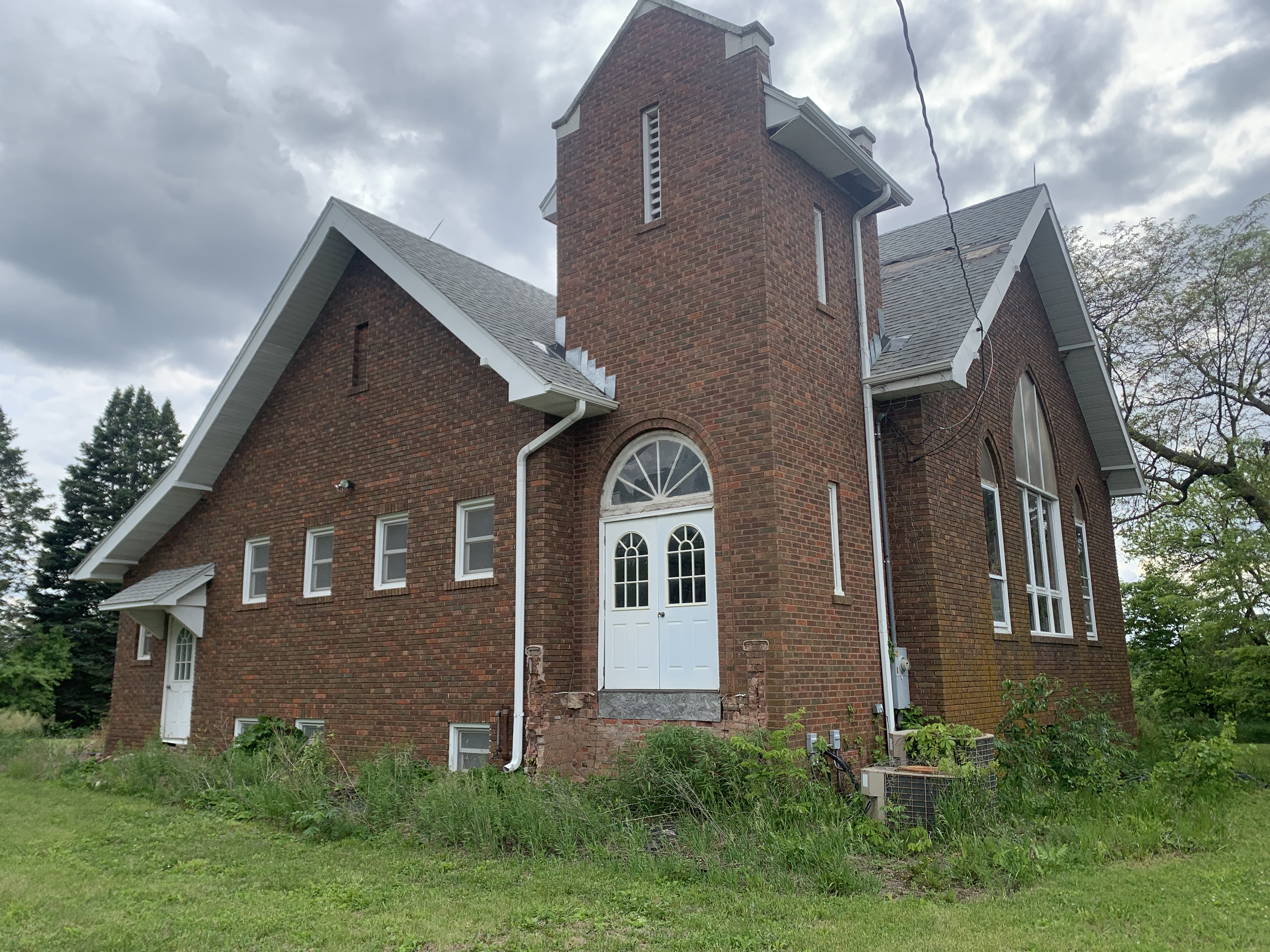
Covenanter Presbyterian Church in Harlan Township in 2025.

Harlan Township is a township in Page County, Iowa, United States.

Harlan Township (Township 68, Range 37) was surveyed in June 1852 by A. Carpenter.
