= Yorktown, Iowa =

- City
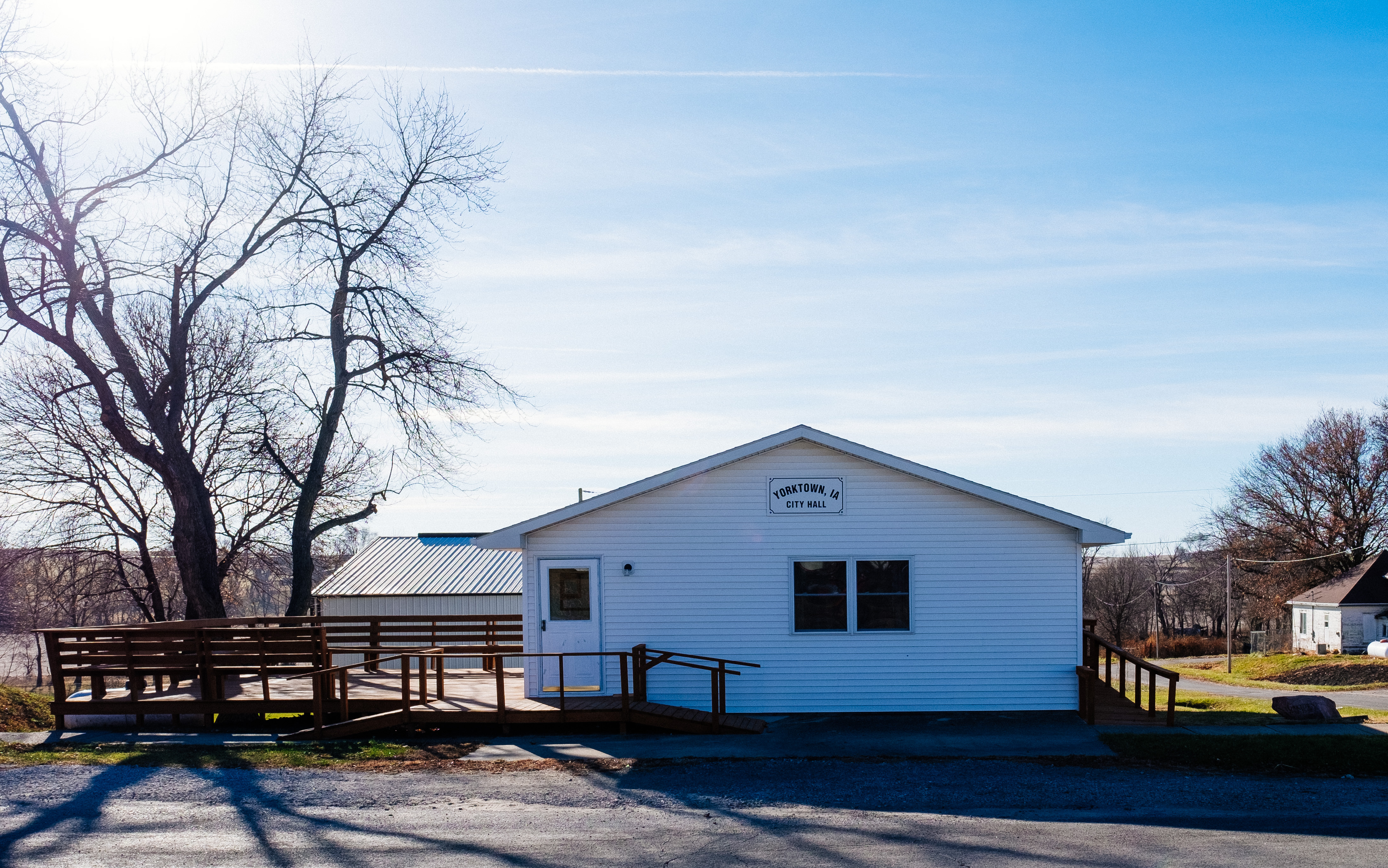
- Yorktown City Hall

- Location of Yorktown, Iowa
- Coordinates: 40°44′07″N 95°09′16″W
- Country: USA
- State: Iowa
- County: Page

Area
  - Total: 0.27 sq mi (0.70 km^{2})
  - Land: 0.27 sq mi (0.70 km^{2})
  - Water: 0 sq mi (0.00 km^{2})
- Elevation: 1,070 ft (330 m)

Population (2020)
  - Total: 60
  - Density: 221/sq mi (85.4/km^{2})
- Time zone: UTC-6 (Central (CST))
  - Summer (DST): UTC-5 (CDT)
- ZIP code: 51656
- Area code: 712
- FIPS code: 19-87420
- GNIS feature ID: 2397393

Yorktown is a city in Page County, Iowa, United States. The population was 60 at the time of the 2020 census.

== History ==
Yorktown was platted in 1882 by C. E. Perkins. It had a station on the Humeston and Shenandoah Railway.

== Geography ==
The city sits in the rolling hills of southwestern Iowa, about 10 miles (16 km) from the Missouri border.

According to the United States Census Bureau, the city has a total area of 0.27 square miles (0.70 km^{2}), all land.

== Demographics ==
Historical populations
Year	Pop.	±%
1900	170	—
1910	228	+34.1%
1920	193	−15.4%
1930	217	+12.4%
1940	197	−9.2%
1950	146	−25.9%
1960	150	+2.7%
1970	105	−30.0%
1980	123	+17.1%
1990	100	−18.7%
2000	82	−18.0%
2010	85	+3.7%
2020	60	−29.4%
Source:"U.S. Census website". United States Census Bureau. and Iowa Data Center; Source: U.S. Decennial Census

=== 2020 Census ===
As of the 2020 Census, the total population was 60 people. The population density was 222 people per square mile, spread over 0.27 miles. Of those 60 people, the median age was 57.5 years, with 14.9% of the town's population under the age of 18, 57.4% between the ages of 18 and 64, and 27.7% of the population over the age of 65. There were a total of 20 households, with an average of 3 people per household.

51% of the town's population was female, with 49% of the population male. The racial makeup of the town was 88.33% White, 8.33% mixed race, and 3.33% Hispanic.

The average income per capita of Yorktown was $17,916, which is lower than the state average, and the median household income was $53,750, 90% of the state average. No one in the town lives underneath of the poverty line.

65% of the population of the town is identified as currently married.

86.5% of the Yorktown population have received a high school degree, which is 6 percentage points lower than the rest of the state. Yorktown has a lower-than-average percentage of the population having received college degrees, with only 10.8% of the town's population have received college degrees compared to the state average of 30.5%.

2.5% of the town's population were veterans.

=== 2010 Census ===
As of the census of 2010, there were 85 people, 32 households, and 24 families living in the city. The population density was 314.8 inhabitants per square mile (121.5/km^{2}). There were 37 housing units at an average density of 137.0 per square mile (52.9/km^{2}). The racial makeup of the city was 87.1% White, 7.1% African American, 1.2% Native American, and 4.7% from other races. Hispanic or Latino of any race were 1.2% of the population.

There were 32 households, of which 25.0% had children under the age of 18 living with them, 62.5% were married couples living together, 6.3% had a female householder with no husband present, 6.3% had a male householder with no wife present, and 25.0% were non-families. 18.8% of all households were made up of individuals, and 6.3% had someone living alone who was 65 years of age or older. The average household size was 2.66 and the average family size was 2.96.

The median age in the city was 47.3 years. 24.7% of residents were under the age of 18; 7.1% were between the ages of 18 and 24; 16.5% were from 25 to 44; 31.8% were from 45 to 64; and 20% were 65 years of age or older. The gender makeup of the city was 57.6% male and 42.4% female.

=== 2000 Census ===
As of the census of 2000, there were 82 people, 36 households, and 25 families living in the city. The population density was 297.2 inhabitants per square mile (114.7/km^{2}). There were 41 housing units at an average density of 148.6 per square mile (57.4/km^{2}). The racial makeup of the city was 100.00% White.

There were 36 households, out of which 30.6% had children under the age of 18 living with them, 58.3% were married couples living together, 8.3% had a female householder with no husband present, and 27.8% were non-families. 25.0% of all households were made up of individuals, and 19.4% had someone living alone who was 65 years of age or older. The average household size was 2.28 and the average family size was 2.65.

20.7% are under the age of 18, 8.5% from 18 to 24, 30.5% from 25 to 44, 20.7% from 45 to 64, and 19.5% who were 65 years of age or older. The median age was 40 years. For every 100 females, there were 90.7 males. For every 100 females age 18 and over, there were 97.0 males.

The median income for a household in the city was $30,417, and the median income for a family was $38,125. Males had a median income of $29,583 versus $27,188 for females. The per capita income for the city was $13,248. There were 17.6% of families and 23.2% of the population living below the poverty line, including 36.4% of under eighteens and 22.7% of those over 64.

== Education ==
The Clarinda Community School District serves the municipality.

== Transportation ==
While there is no fixed-route transit service in Yorktown, intercity bus service is provided by Jefferson Lines in nearby Clarinda.
