= Douglas Township, Page County, Iowa =

Township in Page County, Iowa, U.S.

Coordinates: 40°51′N 95°06′W

Douglas Township is a township in Page County, Iowa, United States.

== History ==
Douglas Township (Township 70, Range 37) was surveyed in June 1852 by Thomas Evans and was established in 1858.
