= Tarkio River =

River in Iowa and Missouri, U.S.

Tarkio River Big Tarkio River
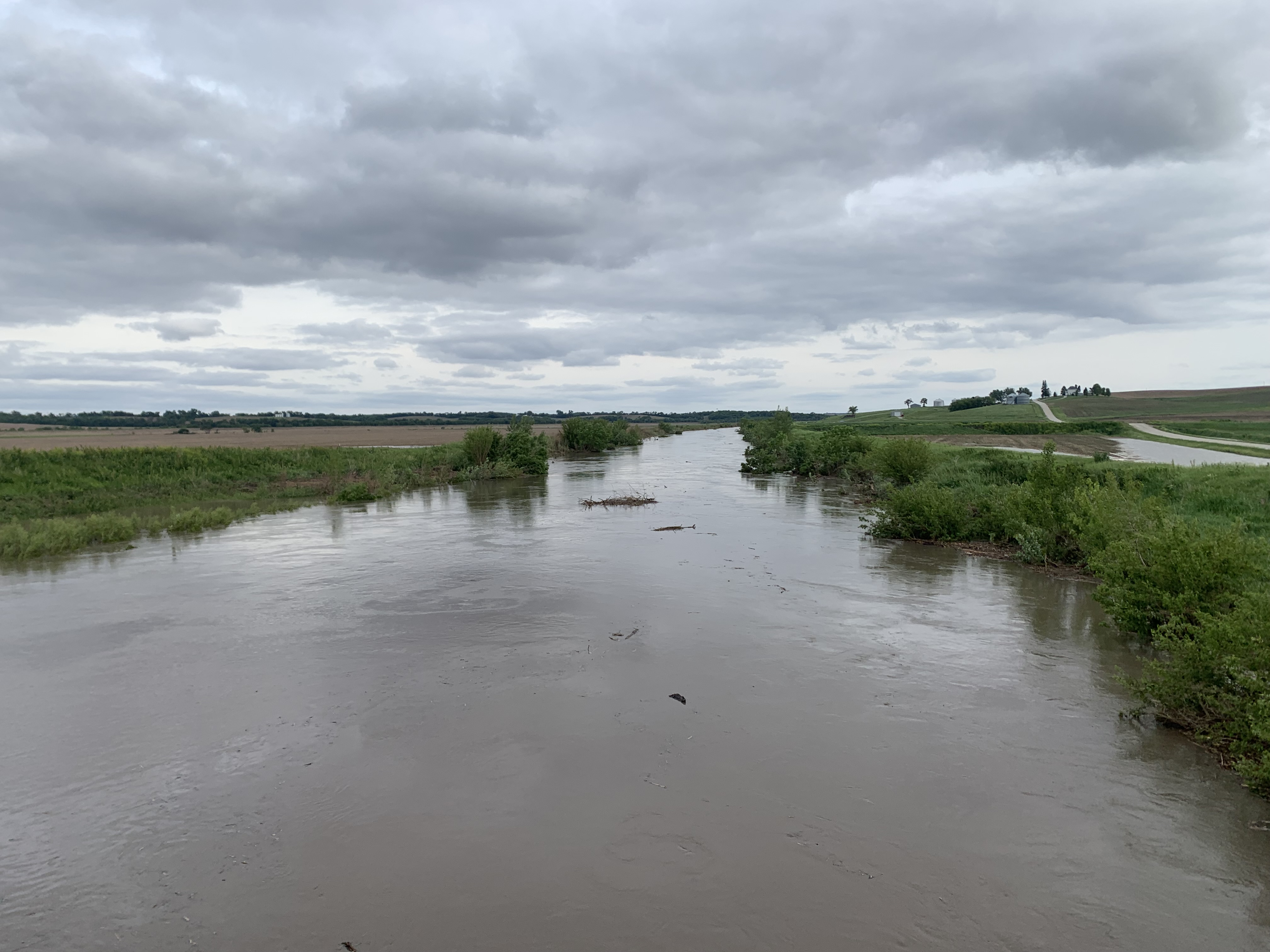
- Tarkio River at Missouri Route J bridge west of Fairfax, Missouri

Location
- Country: United States
- State: Iowa and Missouri
- County: Cass County, Iowa, Montgomery County, Iowa, Page County, Iowa, Atchison County, Missouri, and Holt County, Missouri

Physical characteristics
- Source
  - location: Pleasant Township
  - coordinates: 41°11′38″N 95°03′45″W
  - elevation: 1,300 ft (400 m)
- Mouth: Missouri River
  - location: Union Township
  - coordinates: 40°09′46″N 95°26′19″W
  - elevation: 866 ft (264 m)
- Length: 81.1 mi (130.5 km)
- Basin size: 508 sq mi (1,320 km^{2})
- Discharge
  - location: Fairfax, Missouri
  - average: 223 cu ft/s (6.3 m^{3}/s)
  - minimum: 3.3 cu ft/s (0.093 m^{3}/s)
  - maximum: 1,350 cu ft/s (38 m^{3}/s)

Basin features
- Progression: Tarkio River → Missouri River → Mississippi River → Atlantic Ocean

Tarkio River is a stream in southwestern Iowa and northwestern Missouri. It is a tributary to the Missouri River and is 81.1 miles long. The river is monitored by USGS at Fairfax, Missouri and is considered a major water source by the Iowa DNR.

The river passes rural areas and figures most prominently in the drainage system nears its mouth in management of Big Lake, Missouri and the Loess Bluffs National Wildlife Refuge, formerly known as Squaw Creek National Wildlife Refuge. Several streams and ditches in the Missouri River bottoms near its mouth contain the Tarkio name.

== Etymology ==
The name Tarkio is from a Native American word meaning "place where walnuts grow".

== History ==
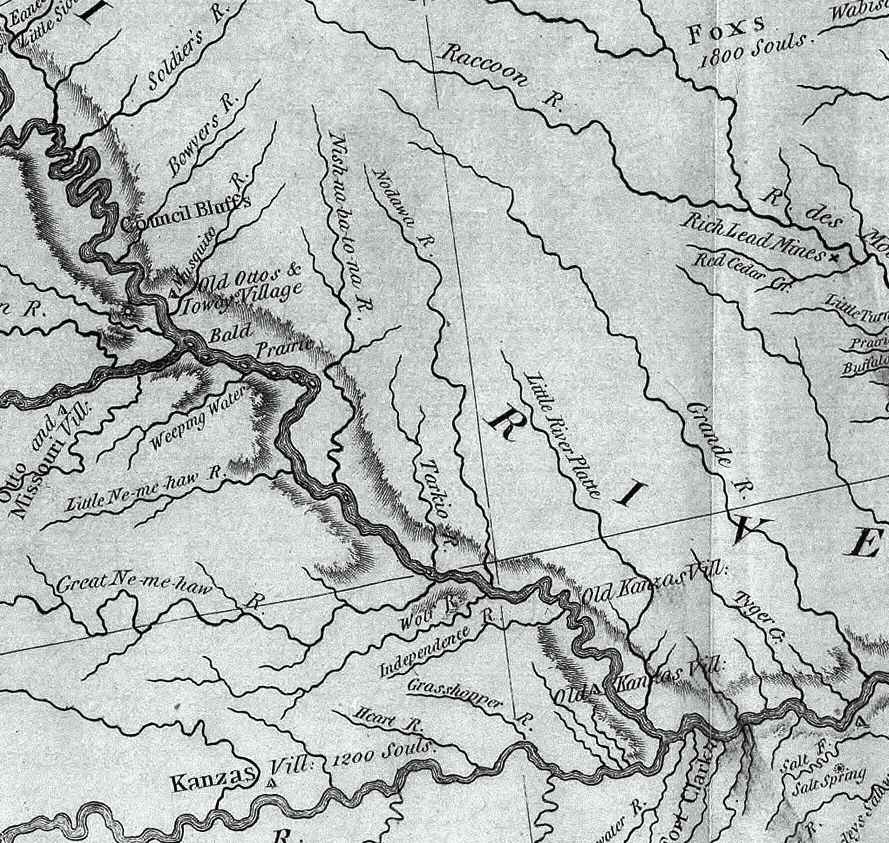
Lewis and Clark Expedition maps showing the Tarkio between Nishnabotna and Nodaway River

Some of the earliest settlements along the river date to the early 1840s in Clark Township of Atchison County, Missouri. And the purported price of land on the eastern side of the Tarkio River was 15 cents an acre.

== Geography ==
Tarkio River is a left tributary of the Missouri River and joins it about 140 miles upstream from Kaw Point in Kansas City, and 507 miles before its mouth in the Mississippi River. The river basin which drains approximately 508 square miles (1,316 km^{2}) and is between the Nishnabotna River to the west and the Nodaway River to the east.

=== Course ===
The river starts as an arroyo in Cass County, Iowa southeast of Griswold, Iowa and becomes a full stream just south of the county line in Montgomery County, Iowa north of Stanton, Iowa and heads south through Montgomery County into Page County, Iowa passing Coin, Iowa. It enters Missouri in Atchison County, Missouri at Blanchard, Iowa. It passes Tarkio, Missouri and Fairfax, Missouri (which is the main gage for river reporting). It enters Holt County near Corning, Missouri and enters the Missouri River at river mile (RM) 507 or river kilometer (RK) 816. The river has a mean annual discharge of 244 cubic feet per second at Fairfax.

=== Crossings ===
There are six major highway crossings of the Tarkio River, four in Missouri and two in Iowa. The Missouri crossings are: I-29 at mile marker 97, US 59, US 136, and Route 111; and the Iowa crossings are US 34 and Iowa 2.

== Other streams with Tarkio name ==
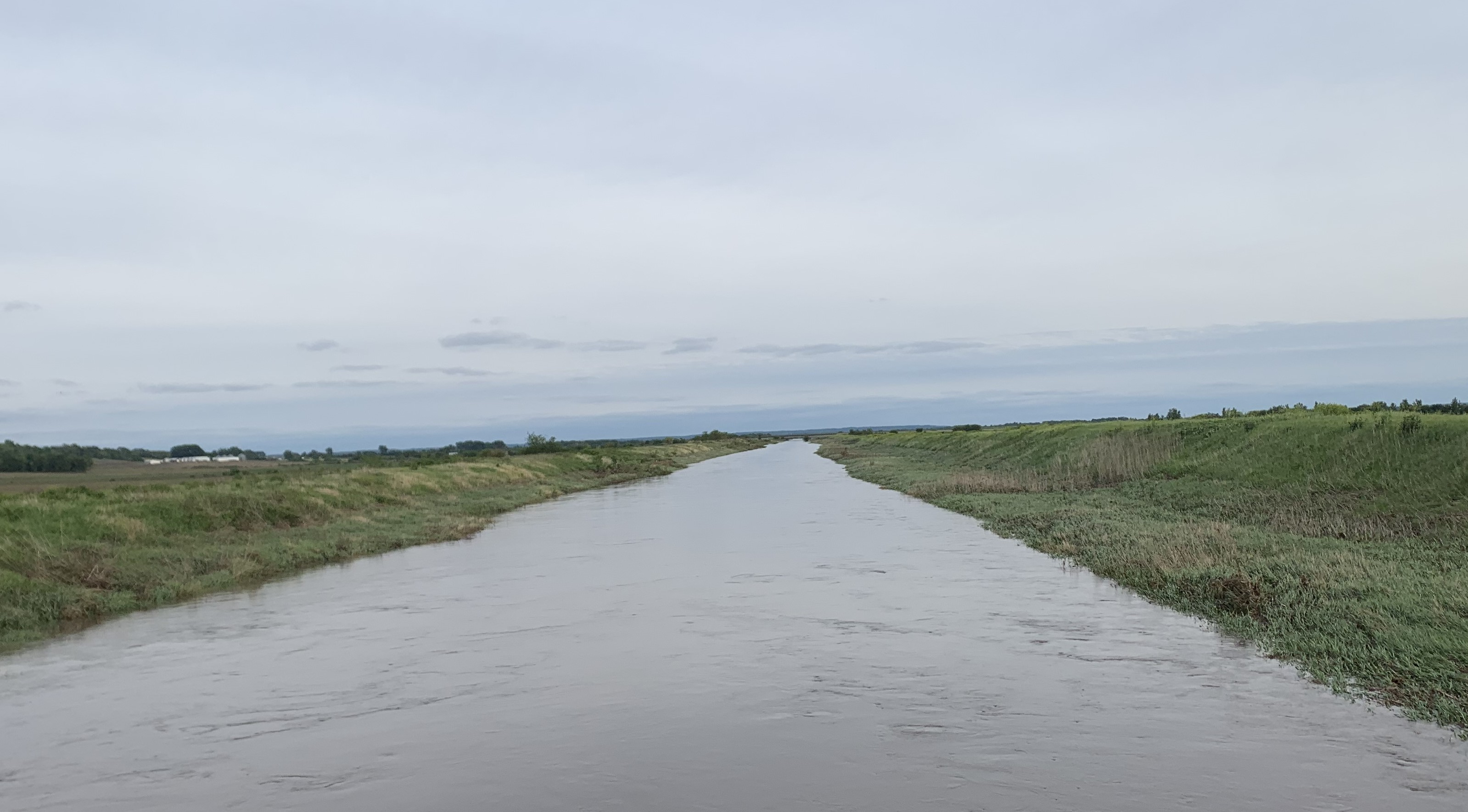
Little Tarkio Creek at US 59 bridge east of Craig, Missouri

There are several streams with the Tarkio name in the Missouri River bottoms near where the Tarkio meets the Missouri. Almost none of the streams actually flows into the Tarkio although some are historically part of the river.

- Old Channel Tarkio River - The river originally flowed further south along the base of the bluffs by Craig, Missouri. It now drains into Little Tarkio Creek.
- Little Tarkio Creek - The creek which begins in the bluffs above the Missouri flows on the east side of Big Lake and passes Fortescue, Missouri before emptying into the Missouri at RM 493 (RK 793).
- Old Channel Little Tarkio Creek - The creek flows on the west side of Squaw Creek National Wildlife Refuge and drains into Little Tarkio Ditch
- Little Tarkio Ditch - The ditch drains the water from the Squaw Creek National Wildlife Refuge and drains into the Missouri at approximately RM 485 (RK 781).

== Flooding ==
The drainage of the river through the flatlands of the Missouri can sometimes lead to spectacular floods when the river cannot drain. In the Great Flood of 1993 flooding caused Interstate 29 to be closed near the mouth. In the 2011 Missouri River floods, the Tarkio River and its other namesakes overwashed an area from Fortescue to the Missouri River totally obliterating Big Lake. On July 7, 2011, the river rose 8 feet (2.4 m) in six hours in one burst at Fairfax.

== See also ==
- List of tributaries of the Missouri River
- List of rivers of Iowa
- List of rivers of Missouri
