= Union Township, Holt County, Missouri =

Township in Holt County, Missouri, U.S.

Union Township
- Township
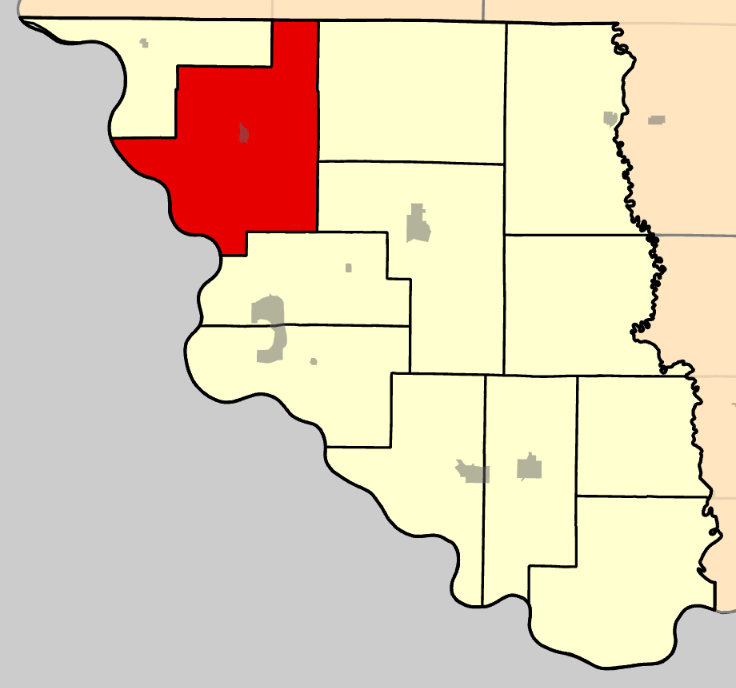
- Coordinates: 40°11′03″N 95°22′46″W
- Country: United States
- State: Missouri
- County: Holt

Area
  - Total: 52.42 sq mi (135.8 km^{2})
  - Land: 51.88 sq mi (134.4 km^{2})
  - Water: 0.54 sq mi (1.4 km^{2}) 1.03%
- Elevation: 866 ft (264 m)

Population (2020)
  - Total: 224
  - Density: 4.3/sq mi (1.7/km^{2})
- FIPS code: 29-08774680
- GNIS feature ID: 766772

Union Township is a township in Holt County, Missouri, United States. At the 2020 census, its population was 224. It is the largest township in Holt County, being over 50 square miles. Craig, the only extant community, is located in the township's center.

== History ==
Union Township was settled in the early 1840s, at Sharpe's Grove, but its establishment date is unknown.

Marietta was first settled circa 1844 and was established March 15, 1854, was a community on the east bank of the Missouri River, southwest of where Craig is today, near Lewsiville. A post office named Rushbottom existed from 1850 to 1871. Rush Bottoms Conservation Area is where the settlement used to be. A schoolhouse named Marietta persisted until at least 1920.

A hamlet called Tarkio, also known as Tarkeo or Big Spring, was located in the northern portion of Union township, about 1.75 miles northwest of Craig, along the Big Tarkio Creek. There was a post office named Tarkio from 1843 to 1869.

The Kansas City, St. Joseph, and Council Bluffs Railroad was completed through this township in 1869.

== Geography ==
Union Township is the largest township in area in Holt County and the only one to touch its northern and western boundary. Two-thirds of its area is the Missouri River bottomlands, and the rest is the Loess Bluffs.

Two of Holt County's largest streams flow north-south through the township, the Tarkio River and Little Tarkio Creek. Also, a couple named landforms are present in the northern bluffs of the township, Pigeon Ridge and Mill Hollow.

== Transportation ==
The following highways travel through the township:

- Interstate 29
- U.S. Route 59
- Route 111
