= W.T.S. White House and Carriage House =

Historic house in Iowa, United States

- U.S. National Register of Historic Places
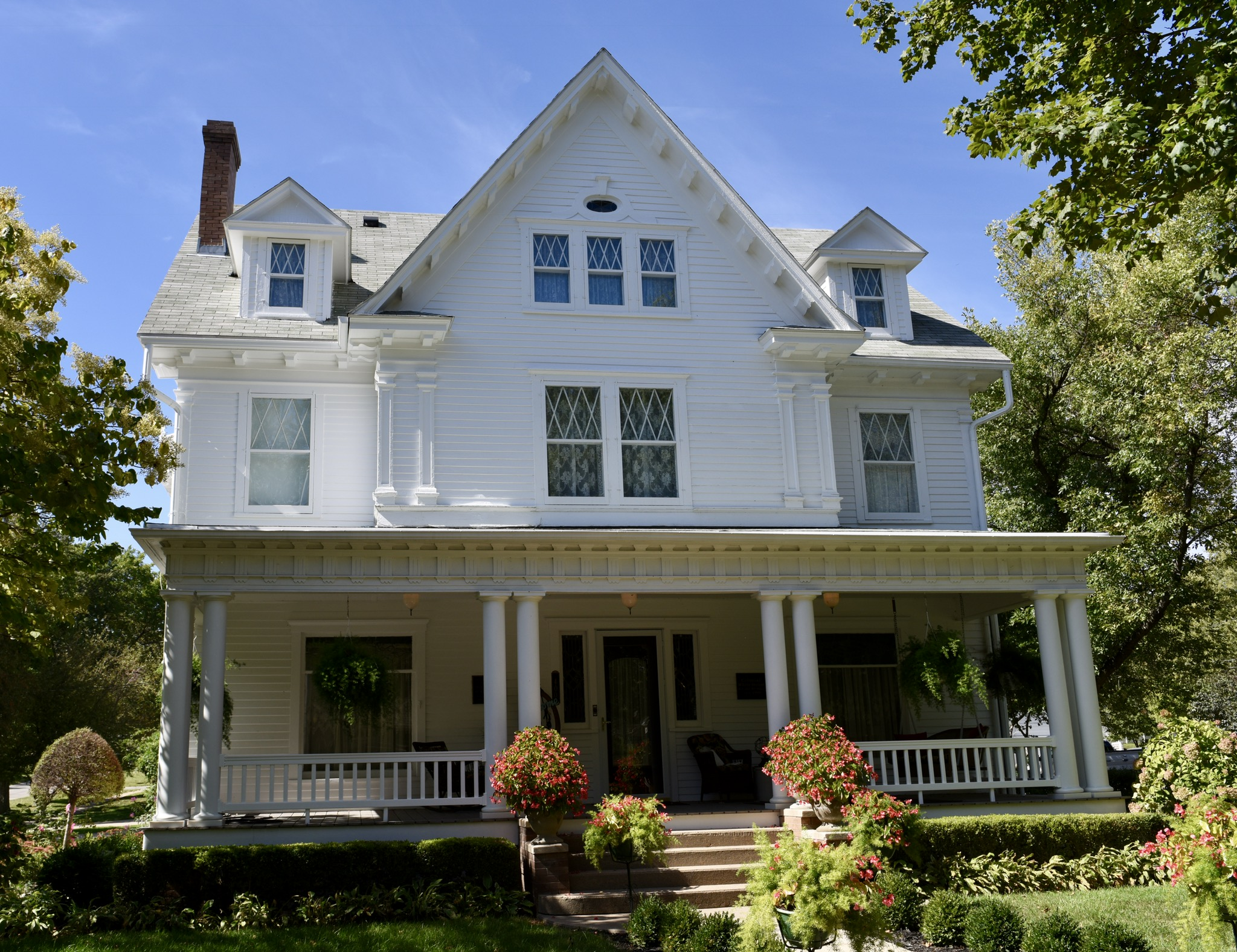

- Location within Iowa Location within the United States
- Location: 400 N. 16th St. Clarinda, Iowa
- Coordinates: 40°44′30.2″N 95°02′17.5″W
- Area: less than one acre
- Built: 1906
- Architect: William W. Welch
- Architectural style: Colonial Revival
- NRHP reference No.: 93001544
- Added to NRHP: January 21, 1994

The W.T.S. White House and Carriage House are historic buildings located in Clarinda, Iowa, United States. White created his fortune as president of the Clarinda Poultry Butter and Egg Company. He hired local architect William W. Welch to design his house. It and the carriage house were completed in 1906, and White moved to Chicago the following year. He sold the property to A.U. and Agnes Hunt for $8,000. The house and carriage house were listed together on the National Register of Historic Places in 1994. Both structures are Colonial Revival in style. The 2½-story frame house features Tuscan columns on the front porch, dentil cornice, and diamond lights in the second floor windows. The two-story carriage house measures 25 by 30 feet (7.6 by 9.1 m), and is located behind the main house. It originally housed a horse and buggy, and has been transformed into an automobile garage.
