= Hepburn, Iowa =

- Unincorporated community
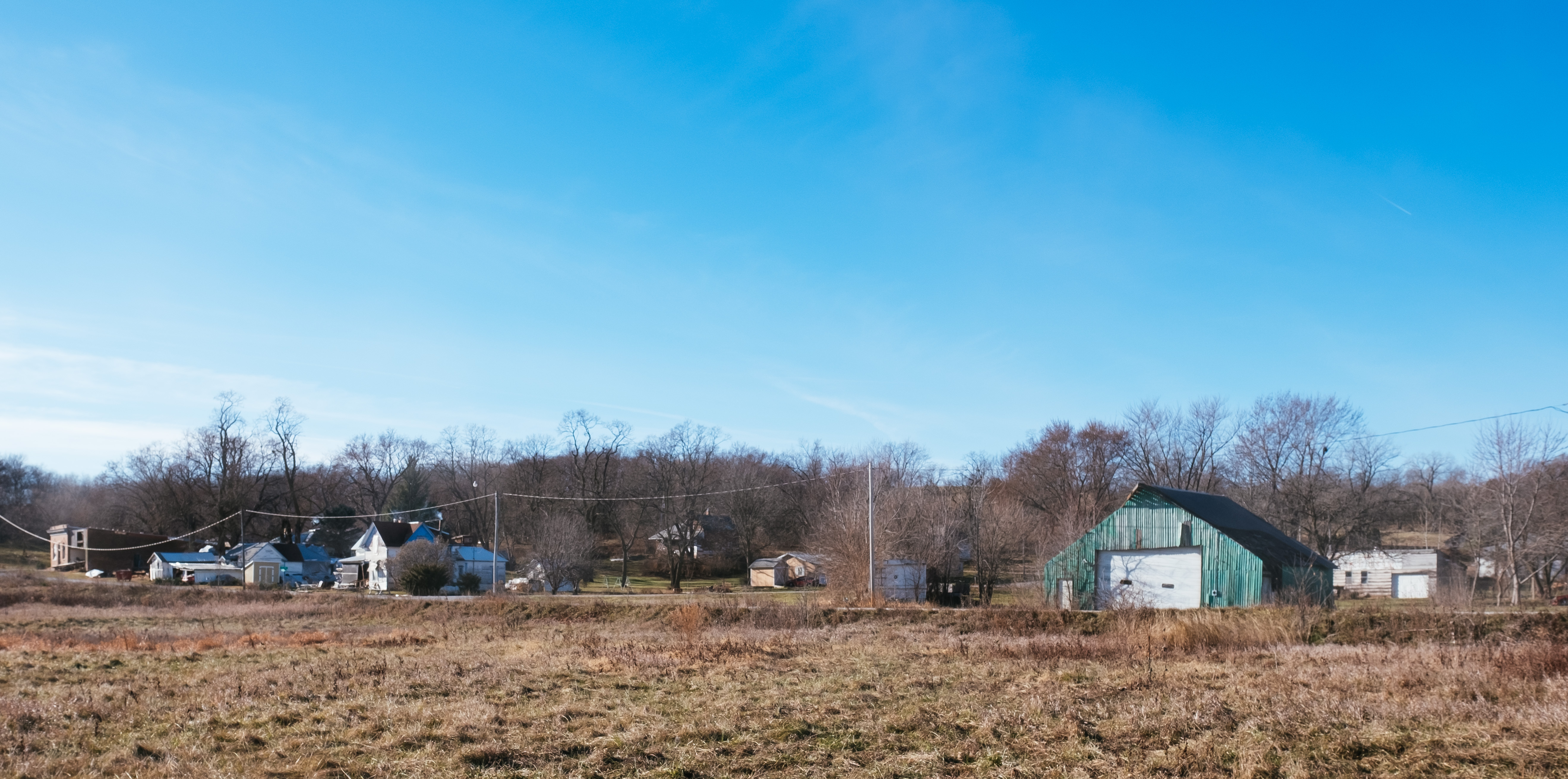
- Buildings along Railroad Street

- Location of Hepburn, Iowa
- Coordinates: 40°50′51″N 95°01′00″W
- Country: United States
- State: Iowa
- County: Page
- Incorporated: 1901
- Disincorporated: 2022

Area
  - Total: 0.081 sq mi (0.21 km^{2})
  - Land: 0.081 sq mi (0.21 km^{2})
  - Water: 0 sq mi (0.00 km^{2})
- Elevation: 1,050 ft (320 m)

Population (2020)
  - Total: 26
  - Density: 315.8/sq mi (121.94/km^{2})
- Time zone: UTC-6 (Central (CST))
  - Summer (DST): UTC-5 (CDT)
- ZIP code: 51632
- Area code: 712
- FIPS code: 19-35760
- GNIS feature ID: 2394356

Hepburn is an unincorporated community in Page County, Iowa, United States. It was formerly an incorporated city until its discontinuance in 2022, when the Iowa City Development Board approved its disincorporation following a vote by the city council. The population was 26 at the time of the 2020 census.

== History ==
Hepburn was platted in 1873, and a post office was opened that same year. It is named for William Peters Hepburn of Clarinda, Iowa, a Civil War veteran (Lt. Col., 2nd Regiment Iowa Volunteer Cavalry), and later a prominent Congressman and staunch political ally of Theodore Roosevelt.

Hepburn had a depot on the Chicago, Burlington and Quincy Railroad.

In 2022, the city council voted to discontinue the city after no residents expressed interest in serving as mayor or council members during the November 2021 general election. The Iowa City Development Board approved the discontinuance in March 2022, formally ending Hepburn's municipal status. Following this, the board assumed control of the city's remaining funds and accounts, and the Page County government took over responsibility for roads and infrastructure maintenance. Residents of the former city now fall under the jurisdiction of the county board of supervisors.

== Geography ==
According to the United States Census Bureau, the city has a total area of 0.08 square miles (0.21 km^{2}), all land.

== Demographics ==
Historical populations
Year	Pop.	±%
1890	75	—
1900	118	+57.3%
1910	110	−6.8%
1920	108	−1.8%
1930	140	+29.6%
1940	81	−42.1%
1950	64	−21.0%
1960	49	−23.4%
1970	38	−22.4%
1980	42	+10.5%
1990	41	−2.4%
2000	39	−4.9%
2010	23	−41.0%
2020	26	+13.0%
Source:"U.S. Census website". United States Census Bureau. and Iowa Data Center; Source: U.S. Decennial Census

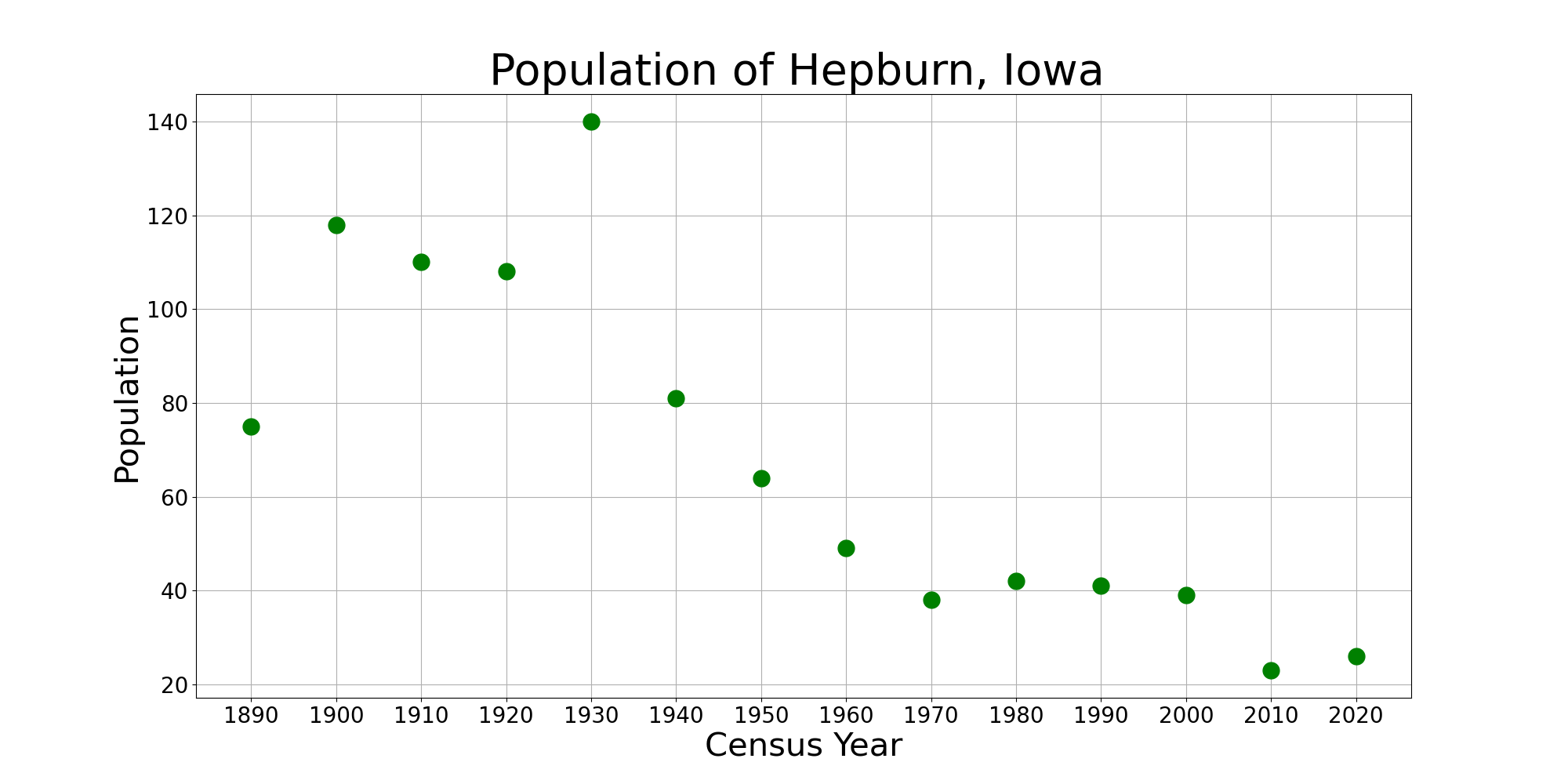
The population of Hepburn, Iowa from US census data

=== 2020 census ===
As of the census of 2020, there were 26 people, 8 households, and 8 families residing in the city. The population density was 315.8 inhabitants per square mile (121.9/km^{2}). There were 8 housing units at an average density of 97.2 per square mile (37.5/km^{2}). The racial makeup of the city was 88.5% White, 0.0% Black or African American, 0.0% Native American, 0.0% Asian, 0.0% Pacific Islander, 0.0% from other races and 11.5% from two or more races. Hispanic or Latino persons of any race comprised 0.0% of the population.

Of the 8 households, 62.5% of which had children under the age of 18 living with them, 50.0% were married couples living together, 0.0% were cohabitating couples, 37.5% had a female householder with no spouse or partner present and 12.5% had a male householder with no spouse or partner present. 0.0% of all households were non-families. 0.0% of all households were made up of individuals, 0.0% had someone living alone who was 65 years old or older.

The median age in the city was 46.5 years. 15.4% of the residents were under the age of 20; 3.8% were between the ages of 20 and 24; 23.1% were from 25 and 44; 34.6% were from 45 and 64; and 23.1% were 65 years of age or older. The gender makeup of the city was 57.7% male and 42.3% female.

=== 2010 census ===
As of the census of 2010, there were 23 people, 8 households, and 7 families living in the city. The population density was 287.5 inhabitants per square mile (111.0/km^{2}). There were 10 housing units at an average density of 125.0 per square mile (48.3/km^{2}). The racial makeup of the city was 100.0% White.

There were 8 households, of which 50.0% had children under the age of 18 living with them, 87.5% were married couples living together, and 12.5% were non-families. 12.5% of all households were made up of individuals, and 12.5% had someone living alone who was 65 years of age or older. The average household size was 2.88 and the average family size was 3.14.

The median age in the city was 35.5 years. 34.8% of residents were under the age of 18; 0.0% were between the ages of 18 and 24; 26% were from 25 to 44; 26% were from 45 to 64; and 13% were 65 years of age or older. The gender makeup of the city was 43.5% male and 56.5% female.

=== 2000 census ===
As of the census of 2000, there were 39 people, 15 households, and 10 families living in the city. The population density was 654.1 inhabitants per square mile (252.5/km^{2}). There were 18 housing units at an average density of 301.9 per square mile (116.6/km^{2}). The racial makeup of the city was 94.87% White, and 5.13% from two or more races. Hispanic or Latino of any race were 7.69% of the population.

There were 15 households, out of which 40.0% had children under the age of 18 living with them, 53.3% were married couples living together, 13.3% had a female householder with no husband present, and 33.3% were non-families. 13.3% of all households were made up of individuals, and none had someone living alone who was 65 years of age or older. The average household size was 2.60 and the average family size was 3.00.

28.2% are under the age of 18, 10.3% from 18 to 24, 15.4% from 25 to 44, 30.8% from 45 to 64, and 15.4% who were 65 years of age or older. The median age was 44 years. For every 100 females, there were 105.3 males. For every 100 females age 18 and over, there were 100.0 males.

The median income for a household in the city was $22,500, and the median income for a family was $10,833. Males had a median income of $28,125 versus $26,250 for females. The per capita income for the city was $13,629. There were 37.5% of families and 32.1% of the population living below the poverty line, including no under eighteens and 40.0% of those over 64.

== Education ==
The Clarinda Community School District serves the municipality.

== Transportation ==
While there is no fixed-route transit service in Hepburn, intercity bus service is provided by Jefferson Lines in nearby Clarinda.

== See also ==
- McCoy Polygonal Barn, listed on the National Register of Historic Places.
