= Page County Courthouse (Iowa) =

Courthouse in Iowa, U.S.

- U.S. National Register of Historic Places
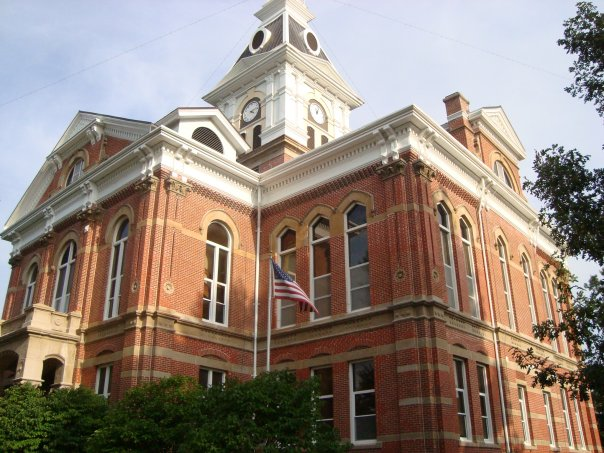

- Location within Iowa Location within the United States
- Location: Main St. Clarinda, Iowa
- Coordinates: 40°44′19.4″N 95°02′13.6″W
- Area: less than one acre
- Built: 1887
- Built by: William Butler
- Architect: William Foster
- Architectural style: Italianate
- MPS: County Courthouses in Iowa TR
- NRHP reference No.: 81000262
- Added to NRHP: July 2, 1981

The Page County Courthouse in Clarinda, Iowa, United States, was built in 1887. It was listed on the National Register of Historic Places in 1981 as a part of the County Courthouses in Iowa Thematic Resource. The courthouse is the fourth building the county has used for court functions and county administration.

== History ==
Initially, the official functions of Page County were carried out 2 miles (3.2 km) southeast of Clarinda. The city became the county seat in 1853. The county judge had a frame structure built on the north side of the public square for his offices and to sell goods. It was destroyed, along with county records, in a fire in 1858. Two years prior to that a two-story frame building was constructed as a courthouse, but the building proved inadequate and court was held in churches and school buildings. Efforts to replace it in 1870 and 1873 failed at the ballot box. The board of supervisors decided to take action on their own and in 1873 a simple building measuring 44 by 60 feet (13 by 18 m) was constructed on the town square in Clarinda for $7,456.

Planning for the current courthouse was begun in 1882 and the foundations were laid in 1885 and the building, completed in 1887, cost $86,500 to construct. The state fire marshal ordered the removal of the clock tower in 1950 because of falling bricks. It was removed the following year and replaced with a wrought iron railing and flagpole. The courthouse was gutted in a fire on December 11, 1991. A bond issue was passed by voters in August 1992 for $875,000 and another $175,000 in private donations was raised to replace the clock tower. The restored courthouse was rededicated on June 5, 1994.

== Architecture ==
The courthouse is a two-story structure that is composed of red brick with limestone trim. Surrounding the main entrance is a single-story stone portico. The building exhibits an eclectic mix of Gothic Revival and Italianate design elements. A wide cornice with a denticular frieze runs below the projecting bracketed eave. The windows feature a variety of shapes, including rectilinear, triangular, segmental arched, and round-arched. The hoods of the round-arch windows give the illusion of being pointed. The courthouse is capped with a hipped roof. In the center of the structure is a high square cupola with a clock, a steep roof, and wrought iron cresting. The significance of the courthouse is derived from its association with county government, and the political power and prestige of Clarinda as the county seat.
