= Tarkio Township, Page County, Iowa =

Township in Page County, Iowa, U.S.

Coordinates: 40°46′16″N 95°12′50″W

Tarkio Township is a township in Page County, Iowa, United States.

== History ==
Tarkio Township (Township 69, Range 38) was surveyed in September 1851 by Thomas D. Evans and was established in 1858. There was a small hamlet that was named after the East Tarkio River, it was called Tarkio City and it once existed in the southern portion of the township near the mouth of the East Tarkio River.
