= Blanchard, Iowa =

- City
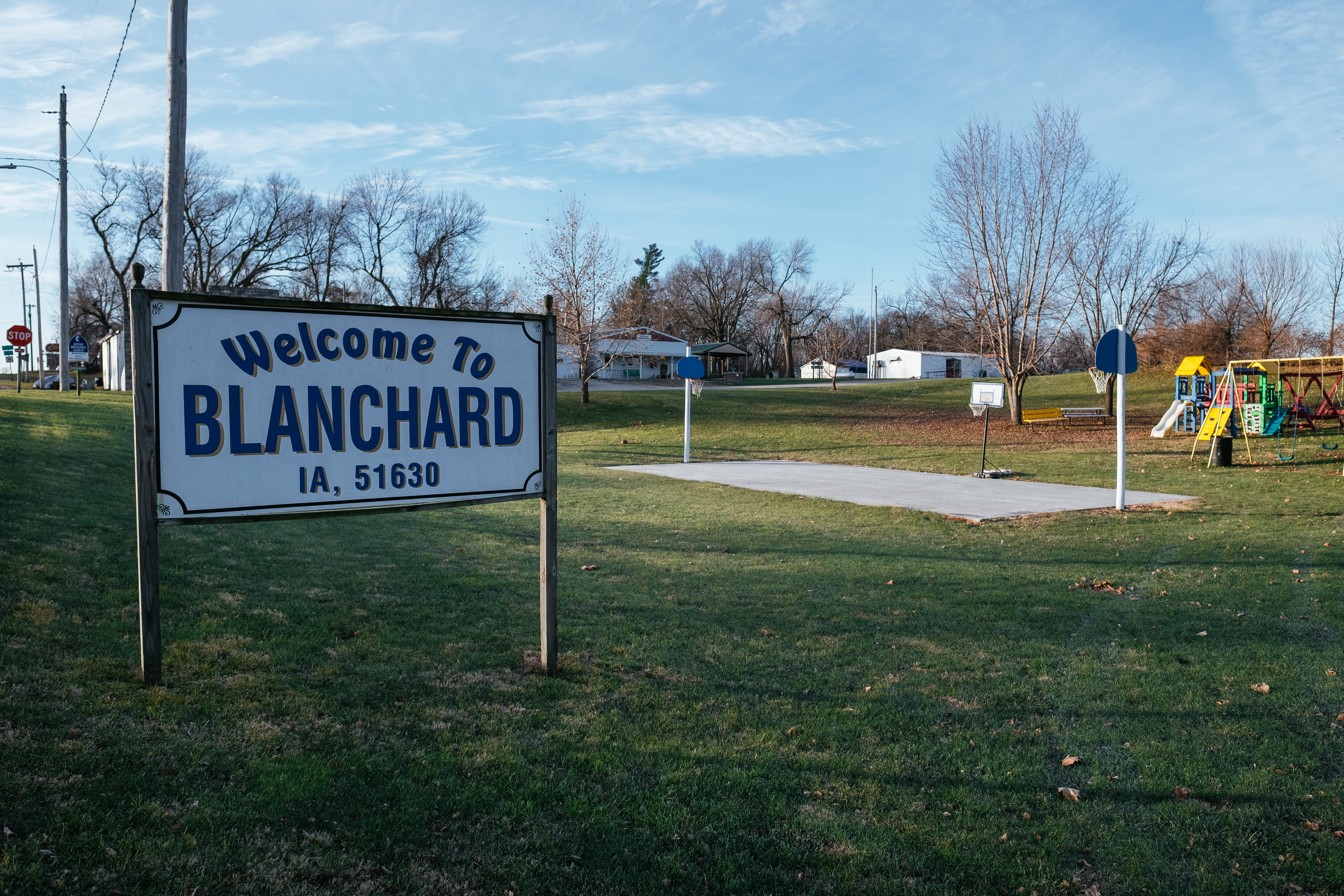
- Welcome Sign and City Park in Blanchard

- Location of Blanchard, Iowa
- Coordinates: 40°34′49″N 95°13′16″W
- Country: United States
- State: Iowa
- County: Page
- Established: 1880

Area
  - Total: 0.20 sq mi (0.52 km^{2})
  - Land: 0.20 sq mi (0.52 km^{2})
  - Water: 0 sq mi (0.00 km^{2})
- Elevation: 994 ft (303 m)

Population (2020)
  - Total: 29
  - Density: 144.6/sq mi (55.83/km^{2})
- Time zone: UTC-6 (Central (CST))
  - Summer (DST): UTC-5 (CDT)
- ZIP code: 51630
- Area code: 712
- FIPS code: 19-06895
- GNIS feature ID: 2394189

Blanchard is a city in Page County, Iowa, United States. The population was 29 at the 2020 census.

A small section of the city reaches into Missouri and is unofficially known as South Blanchard. Lineville in Wayne County is similarly split along state lines.

== History ==
Blanchard was laid out in 1879, and a post office was established that same year. It was incorporated as a town on June 11, 1880.

== Geography ==
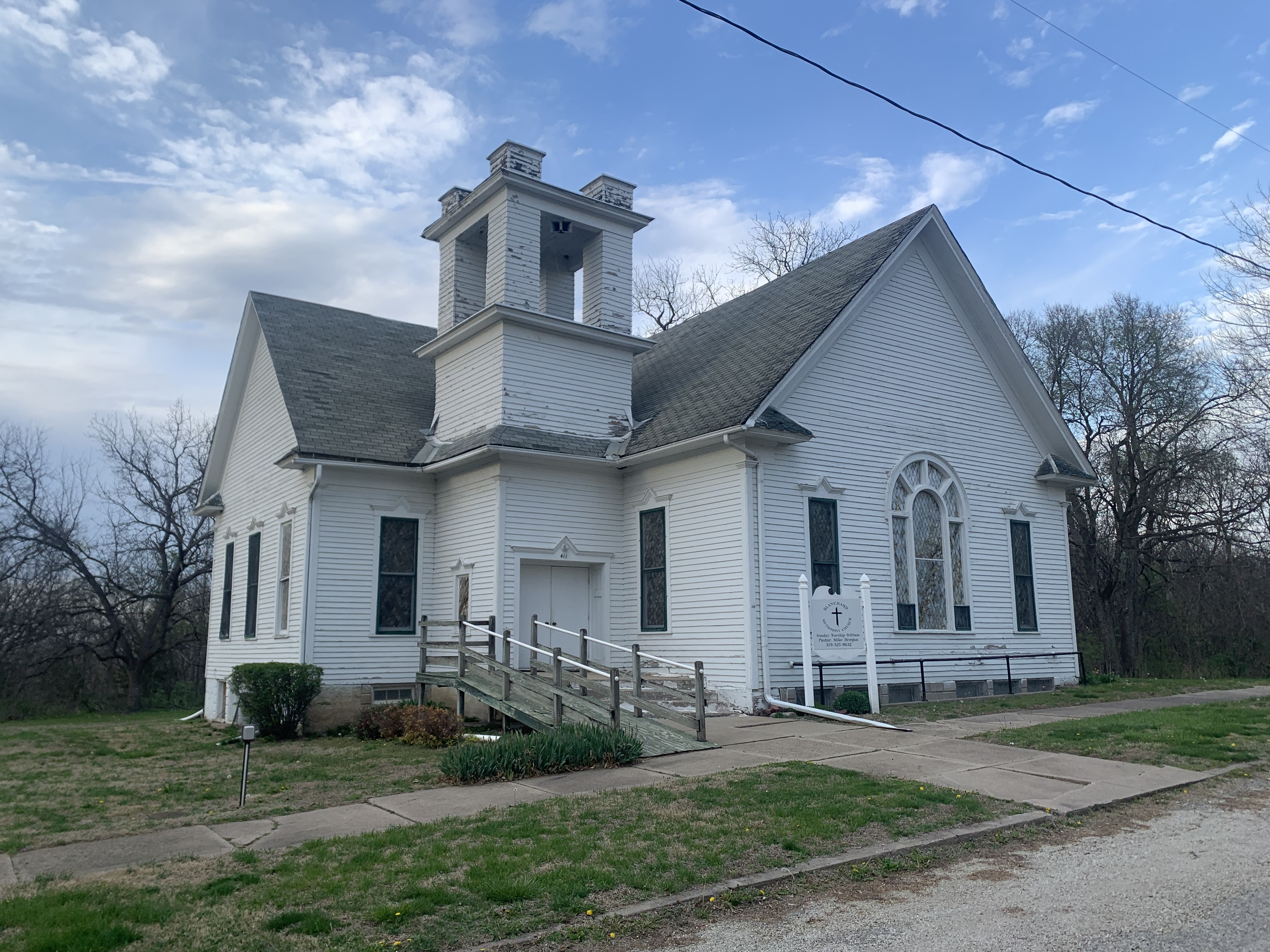
Blanchard Methodist Church

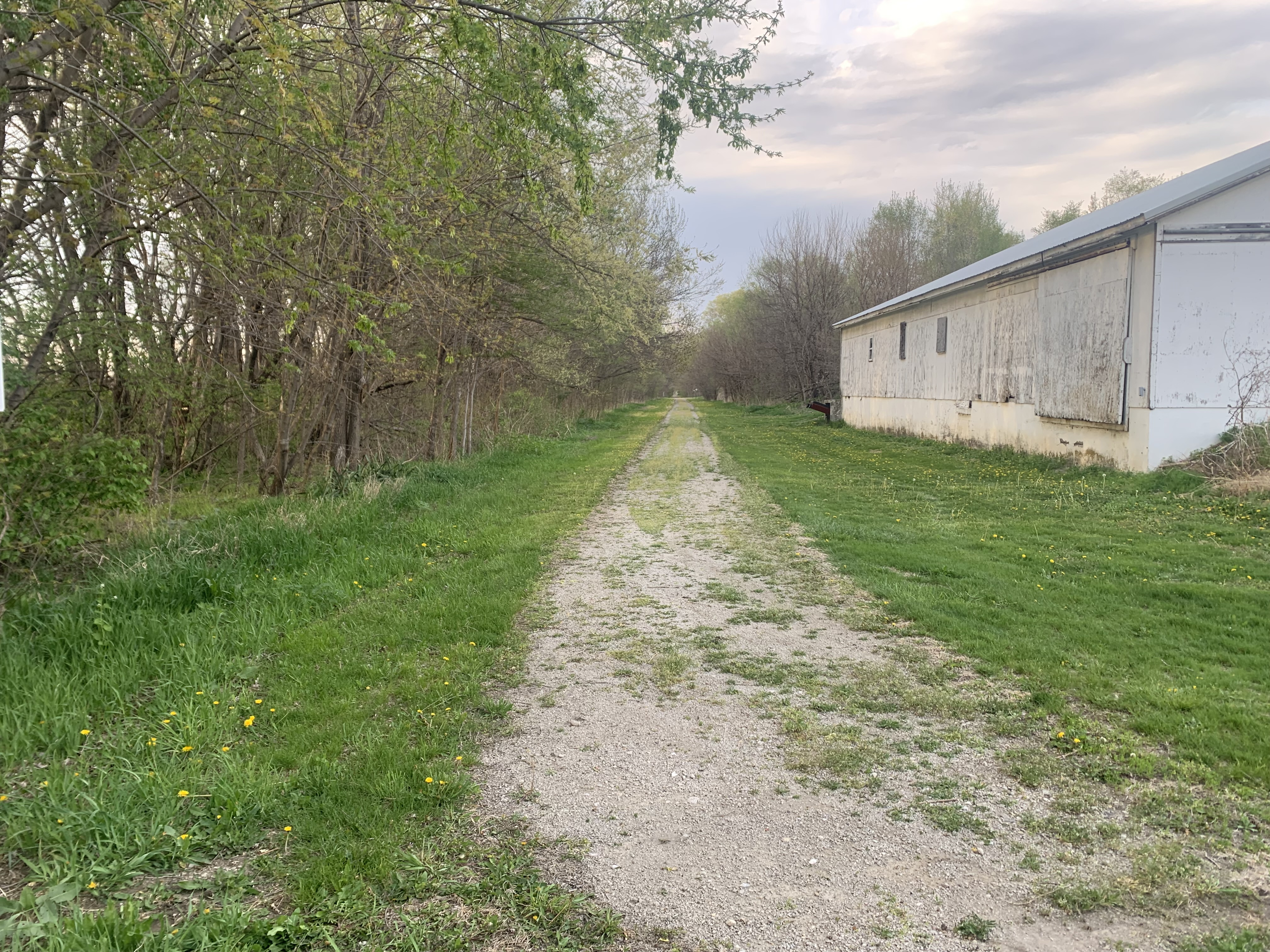
Southern Terminus of Wabash Trace Trail in Blanchard

According to the United States Census Bureau, the city has a total area of 0.23 square miles (0.60 km^{2}), all land.

== Demographics ==
Historical populations
Year	Pop.	±%
1880	321	—
1890	432	+34.6%
1900	520	+20.4%
1910	408	−21.5%
1920	429	+5.1%
1930	347	−19.1%
1940	259	−25.4%
1950	214	−17.4%
1960	174	−18.7%
1970	139	−20.1%
1980	101	−27.3%
1990	67	−33.7%
2000	61	−9.0%
2010	38	−37.7%
2020	29	−23.7%
Source:"U.S. Census website". United States Census Bureau. and Iowa Data Center; Source: U.S. Decennial Census

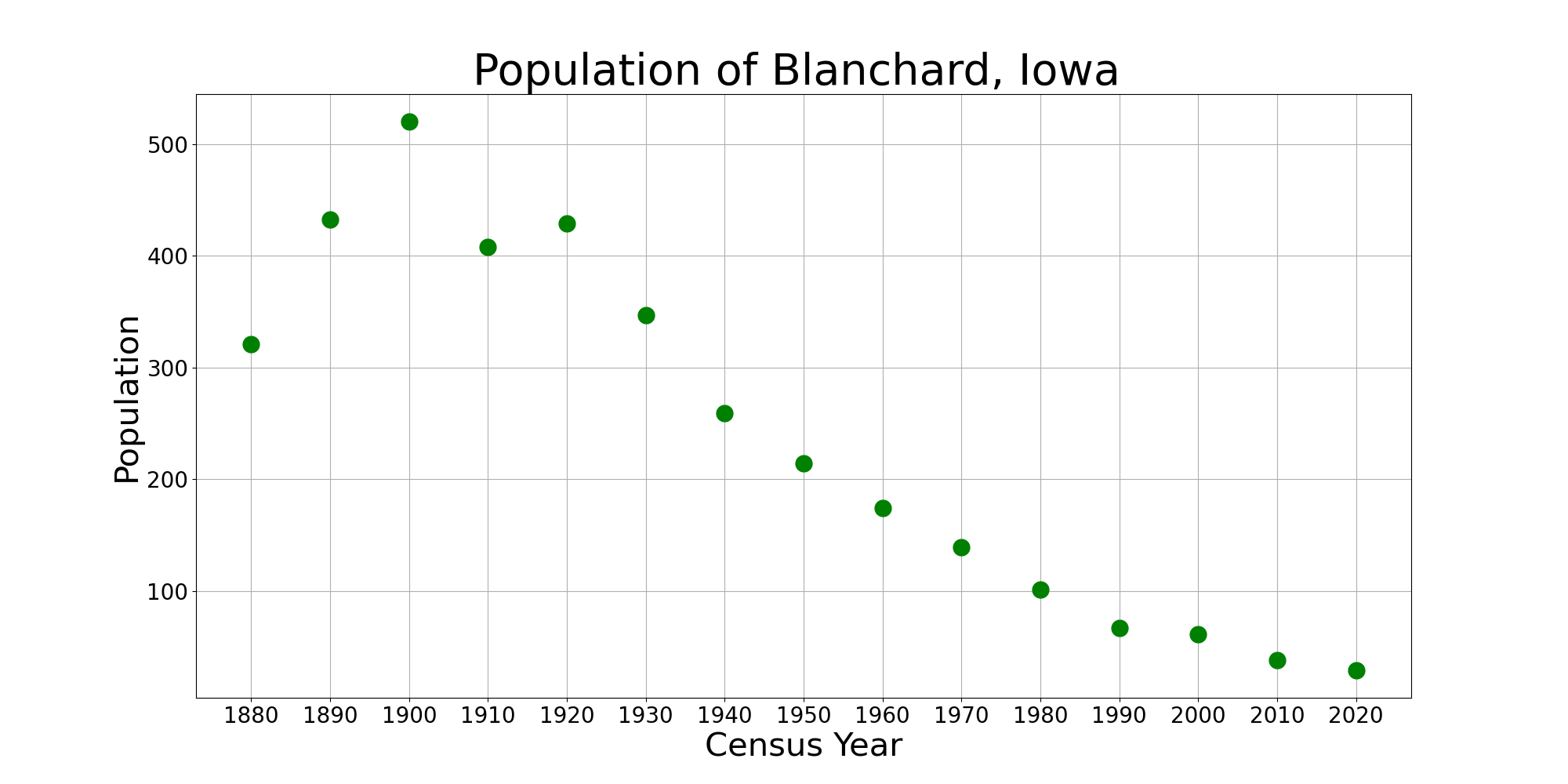
The population of Blanchard, Iowa from US census data

=== 2020 census ===
As of the census of 2020, there were 29 people, 14 households, and 12 families residing in the city. The population density was 144.6 inhabitants per square mile (55.8/km^{2}). There were 17 housing units at an average density of 84.8 per square mile (32.7/km^{2}). The racial makeup of the city was 89.7% White, 0.0% Black or African American, 0.0% Native American, 3.4% Asian, 0.0% Pacific Islander, 6.9% from other races and 0.0% from two or more races. Hispanic or Latino persons of any race comprised 3.4% of the population.

Of the 14 households, 42.9% of which had children under the age of 18 living with them, 57.1% were married couples living together, 7.1% were cohabitating couples, 21.4% had a female householder with no spouse or partner present and 14.3% had a male householder with no spouse or partner present. 14.3% of all households were non-families. 14.3% of all households were made up of individuals, 14.3% had someone living alone who was 65 years old or older.

The median age in the city was 52.2 years. 6.9% of the residents were under the age of 20; 17.2% were between the ages of 20 and 24; 24.1% were from 25 and 44; 20.7% were from 45 and 64; and 31.0% were 65 years of age or older. The gender makeup of the city was 51.7% male and 48.3% female.

=== 2010 census ===
As of the census of 2010, there were 38 people, 18 households, and 12 families residing in the city. The population density was 165.2 inhabitants per square mile (63.8/km^{2}). There were 22 housing units at an average density of 95.7 per square mile (36.9/km^{2}). The racial makeup of the city was 100.0% White.

There were 18 households, of which 16.7% had children under the age of 18 living with them, 55.6% were married couples living together, 5.6% had a female householder with no husband present, 5.6% had a male householder with no wife present, and 33.3% were non-families. 27.8% of all households were made up of individuals, and 16.7% had someone living alone who was 65 years of age or older. The average household size was 2.11 and the average family size was 2.58.

The median age in the city was 46 years. 10.5% of residents were under the age of 18; 13.2% were between the ages of 18 and 24; 26.3% were from 25 to 44; 31.5% were from 45 to 64; and 18.4% were 65 years of age or older. The gender makeup of the city was 50.0% male and 50.0% female.

=== 2000 census ===
As of the census of 2000, there were 61 people, 28 households, and 16 families residing in the city. The population density was 270.9 inhabitants per square mile (104.6/km^{2}). There were 31 housing units at an average density of 137.7 per square mile (53.2/km^{2}). The racial makeup of the city was 100.00% White.

There were 28 households, out of which 25.0% of the households had children under the age of 18 living with them, 42.9% were married couples living together, 3.6% had a female householder with no husband present, and 39.3% were non-families. 32.1% of all households were made up of individuals, and 25.0% had someone living alone who was 65 years of age or older. The average household size was 2.18 and the average family size was 2.71.

21.3% are under the age of 18, 9.8% from 18 to 24, 31.1% from 25 to 44, 13.1% from 45 to 64, and 24.6% who were 65 years of age or older. The median age was 32 years. For every 100 females, there were 103.3 males. For every 100 females age 18 and over, there were 100.0 males.

The median income for a household in the city was $37,917, and the median income for a family was $31,250. Males had a median income of $25,000 versus $21,250 for females. The per capita income for the city was $15,226. There were 9.5% of families and 5.7% of the population living below the poverty line, including 11.1% of under eighteens and none of those over 64.

== Education ==
It is in the South Page Community School District.

== Notable person ==
- Pat Ragan, baseball player.
