= Page County, Iowa =

County in Iowa, United States

- County
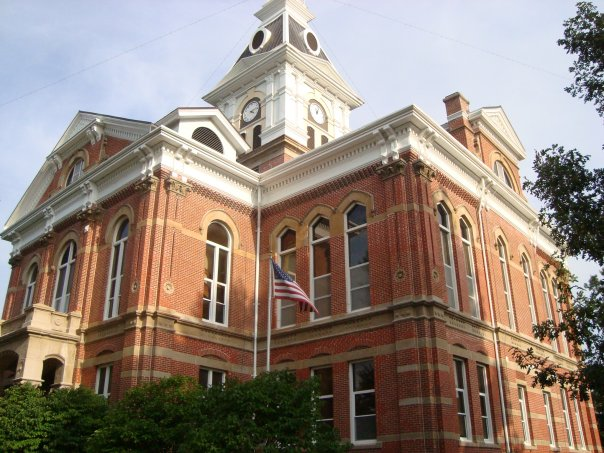
- The courthouse in Clarinda is on the NRHP.

- Location within the U.S. state of Iowa
- Coordinates: 40°44′17″N 95°08′53″W
- Country: United States
- State: Iowa
- Founded: February 24, 1847
- Named for: John Page
- Seat: Clarinda
- Largest city: Clarinda

Area
  - Total: 535 sq mi (1,390 km^{2})
  - Land: 535 sq mi (1,390 km^{2})
  - Water: 0.5 sq mi (1.3 km^{2}) 0.1%

Population (2020)
  - Total: 15,211
  - Estimate (2025): 14,856 ▼
  - Density: 28.4/sq mi (11.0/km^{2})
- Time zone: UTC−6 (Central)
  - Summer (DST): UTC−5 (CDT)
- Congressional district: 3rd
- Website: pagecounty.iowa.gov
- Iowa county number 73

Page County is a county located in the U.S. state of Iowa. As of the 2020 census, the population was 15,211. The county seat is Clarinda. The county is named in honor of Captain John Page of the 4th U.S. Infantry, who was mortally wounded in the Battle of Palo Alto.

== Geography ==
According to the U.S. Census Bureau, the county has a total area of 535 square miles (1,390 km^{2}), of which 535 square miles (1,390 km^{2}) is land and 0.5 square miles (1.3 km^{2}) (0.1%) is water.

=== Major highways ===
- U.S. Highway 59
- U.S. Highway 71
- Iowa Highway 2
- Iowa Highway 48

=== Transit ===
- Jefferson Lines

=== Adjacent counties ===
- Montgomery County (north)
- Taylor County (east)
- Nodaway County, Missouri (southeast)
- Atchison County, Missouri (southwest)
- Fremont County (west)

== Demographics ==
Historical population
Census	Pop.	Note	%±
1850	551		—
1860	4,419		702.0%
1870	9,975		125.7%
1880	19,667		97.2%
1890	21,341		8.5%
1900	24,187		13.3%
1910	24,002		−0.8%
1920	24,137		0.6%
1930	25,904		7.3%
1940	24,887		−3.9%
1950	23,921		−3.9%
1960	21,023		−12.1%
1970	18,537		−11.8%
1980	19,063		2.8%
1990	16,870		−11.5%
2000	16,976		0.6%
2010	15,932		−6.1%
2020	15,211		−4.5%
2025 (est.)	14,856	▼	−2.3%
U.S. Decennial Census; 1790–1960 1900–1990; 1990–2000 2010–2020

=== 2020 census ===
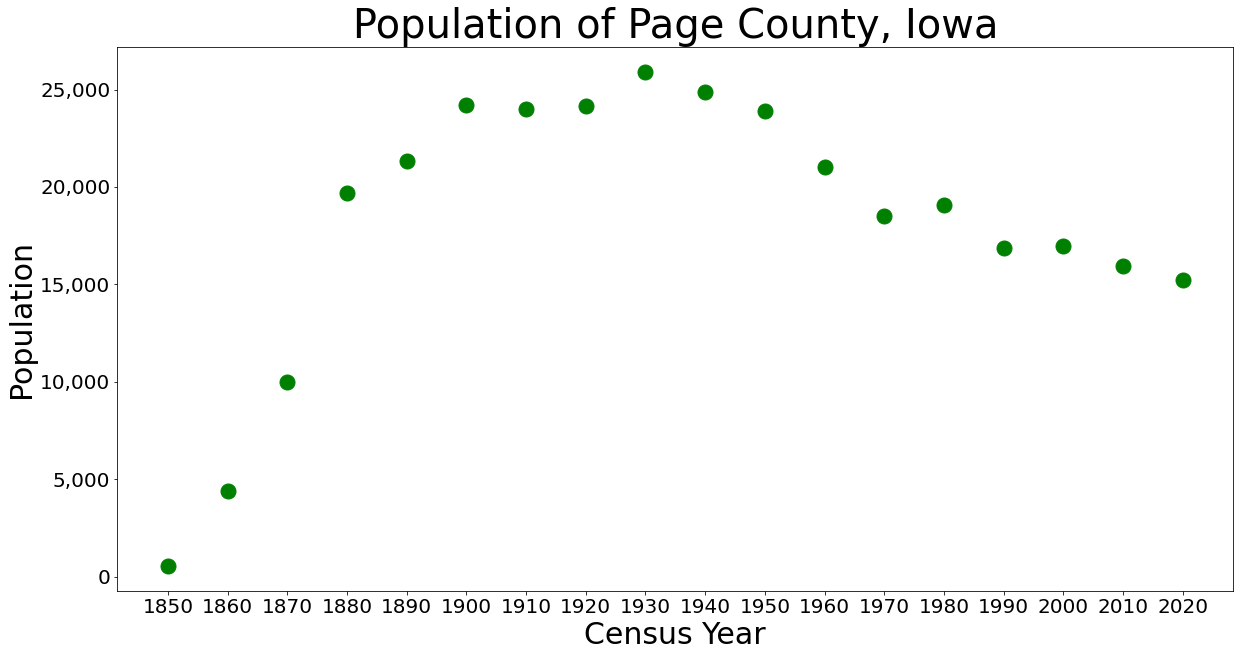
Population of Page County from the U.S. census data

As of the 2020 census, the county had a population of 15,211 and a population density of 28.3/sq mi (10.9/km^{2}).

The median age was 43.3 years. 21.0% of residents were under the age of 18 and 23.2% of residents were 65 years of age or older. For every 100 females there were 112.8 males, and for every 100 females age 18 and over there were 112.8 males age 18 and over.

95.71% of the population reported being of one race. The racial makeup of the county was 91.1% White, 2.4% Black or African American, 0.4% American Indian and Alaska Native, 0.8% Asian, <0.1% Native Hawaiian and Pacific Islander, 1.0% from some other race, and 4.3% from two or more races. Hispanic or Latino residents of any race comprised 3.1% of the population.

66.2% of residents lived in urban areas, while 33.8% lived in rural areas.

There were 6,212 households in the county, of which 25.2% had children under the age of 18 living in them. Of all households, 47.0% were married-couple households, 20.8% were households with a male householder and no spouse or partner present, and 26.2% were households with a female householder and no spouse or partner present. About 34.4% of all households were made up of individuals and 17.6% had someone living alone who was 65 years of age or older.

There were 6,983 housing units, of which 6,212 were occupied; 11.0% were vacant. Among occupied housing units, 69.2% were owner-occupied and 30.8% were renter-occupied. The homeowner vacancy rate was 2.8% and the rental vacancy rate was 8.9%.

=== 2010 census ===
As of the 2010 census recorded a population of 15,932 in the county, with a population density of 29.8/sq mi (11.5/km^{2}). There were 7,181 housing units, of which 6,393 were occupied.

=== 2000 census ===
As of the 2000 census, there were 16,976 people, 6,708 households, and 4,460 families in the county. The population density was 32 people per square mile (12 people/km^{2}). There were 7,302 housing units at an average density of 14 units per square mile (5.4 units/km^{2}). The racial makeup of the county was 96.11% White, 1.66% Black or African American, 0.49% Native American, 0.48% Asian, 0.01% Pacific Islander, 0.49% from other races, and 0.77% from two or more races. 1.56% were Hispanic or Latino people of any race.

Of the 6,708 households 28.20% had children under the age of 18 living with them, 55.50% were married couples living together, 8.10% had a female householder with no husband present, and 33.50% were non-families. 29.90% of households were one person and 15.40% were one person aged 65 or older. The average household size was 2.32 and the average family size was 2.87.

The age distribution was 23.30% under the age of 18, 7.90% from 18 to 24, 26.30% from 25 to 44, 22.80% from 45 to 64, and 19.80% 65 or older. The median age was 40 years. For every 100 females there were 102.70 males. For every 100 females age 18 and over, there were 101.80 males.

The median household income was $35,466 and the median family income was $42,446. Males had a median income of $32,549 versus $21,526 for females. The per capita income for the county was $16,670. About 8.10% of families and 12.50% of the population were below the poverty line, including 17.90% of those under age 18 and 7.60% of those age 65 or over.

== Communities ==
=== Cities ===
- Blanchard
- Braddyville
- Clarinda
- Coin
- College Springs
- Essex
- Hepburn
- Northboro
- Shambaugh
- Shenandoah
- Yorktown

=== Townships ===
- Amity
- Buchanan
- Colfax
- Douglas
- East River
- Fremont
- Grant
- Harlan
- Lincoln
- Morton
- Nebraska
- Nodaway
- Pierce
- Tarkio
- Valley
- Washington

=== Population ranking ===
The population ranking of the following table is based on the 2020 census of Page County.

† county seat

Rank	City/Town/etc.	Municipal type	Population (2020 Census)
1	† Clarinda	City	5,369
2	Shenandoah (partially in Fremont County)	City	4,925 (4,925 total)
3	Essex	City	722
4	Coin	City	176
5	College Springs	City	172
6	Shambaugh	City	159
7	Braddyville	City	147
8	Yorktown	City	60
9	Northboro	City	52
10	Blanchard	City	29
11	Hepburn	City	26

== History ==
A fire on December 11, 1991, heavily damaged the Page County Courthouse. The fire was believed to have started in the attic and spread throughout much of the building. Multiple area fire departments fought the blaze and saved the structure. Court services were relocated to several buildings in Clarinda and other areas of Page County as repairs were made to the courthouse. After 2 1/2 years of work, the courthouse was re-occupied in March 1994.

== Politics ==
Page County has consistently voted Republican since the Civil War, with the exception of Franklin D. Roosevelt in 1932. Roosevelt lost the county in 1936 despite winning nationally by a larger margin than in 1932. In the 2024 presidential election, Page County was the only county in Iowa to shift toward the Democratic candidate compared to 2020, with a margin change of 0.7 percentage points.

United States presidential election results for Page County, Iowa
Year	Republican		Democratic		Third party(ies)	
Year	No.	%	No.	%	No.	%
1896	3,213	56.32%	2,390	41.89%	102	1.79%
1900	3,424	60.68%	1,889	33.48%	330	5.85%
1904	3,463	71.21%	944	19.41%	456	9.38%
1908	3,141	60.77%	1,726	33.39%	302	5.84%
1912	980	19.65%	1,462	29.32%	2,545	51.03%
1916	2,993	60.87%	1,747	35.53%	177	3.60%
1920	6,949	76.10%	1,931	21.15%	251	2.75%
1924	6,023	65.58%	1,643	17.89%	1,518	16.53%
1928	7,181	73.34%	2,478	25.31%	133	1.36%
1932	4,512	47.46%	4,863	51.15%	132	1.39%
1936	6,624	58.50%	4,646	41.03%	53	0.47%
1940	7,407	64.04%	4,102	35.47%	57	0.49%
1944	6,300	65.07%	3,297	34.05%	85	0.88%
1948	5,638	60.15%	3,567	38.05%	169	1.80%
1952	8,840	76.52%	2,669	23.10%	44	0.38%
1956	7,380	70.98%	3,001	28.86%	16	0.15%
1960	7,089	69.69%	3,075	30.23%	8	0.08%
1964	4,775	51.85%	4,402	47.80%	32	0.35%
1968	5,907	68.06%	2,128	24.52%	644	7.42%
1972	6,200	76.43%	1,790	22.07%	122	1.50%
1976	5,343	64.10%	2,865	34.37%	127	1.52%
1980	5,618	71.93%	1,772	22.69%	420	5.38%
1984	5,876	75.06%	1,914	24.45%	38	0.49%
1988	4,583	67.37%	2,185	32.12%	35	0.51%
1992	3,670	50.21%	1,951	26.69%	1,689	23.11%
1996	4,032	57.25%	2,220	31.52%	791	11.23%
2000	4,588	65.00%	2,293	32.48%	178	2.52%
2004	5,243	69.79%	2,211	29.43%	59	0.79%
2008	4,351	59.12%	2,900	39.41%	108	1.47%
2012	4,348	61.42%	2,613	36.91%	118	1.67%
2016	4,893	69.46%	1,807	25.65%	344	4.88%
2020	5,319	70.66%	2,086	27.71%	123	1.63%
2024	5,153	70.38%	2,060	28.13%	109	1.49%

== See also ==
- National Register of Historic Places listings in Page County, Iowa
- Page County Courthouse
- USS Page County (LST-1076)
- Shenandoah Chamber of Industry Homepage
