= Nodaway =

Nodaway can refer to several places in the United States:

- Nodaway County, Missouri
- Nodaway, Iowa
- Nodaway, Missouri
- The Nodaway River, in Iowa and Missouri
- Nodaway Valley Community School District

There are six townships named Nodaway:

- Nodaway Township, Adams County, Iowa
- Nodaway Township, Page County, Iowa
- Nodaway Township, Taylor County, Iowa
- Nodaway Township, Andrew County, Missouri
- Nodaway Township, Holt County, Missouri
- Nodaway Township, Nodaway County, Missouri
