= Cuyhoga Creek =

Stream in northwest Missouri, U.S.

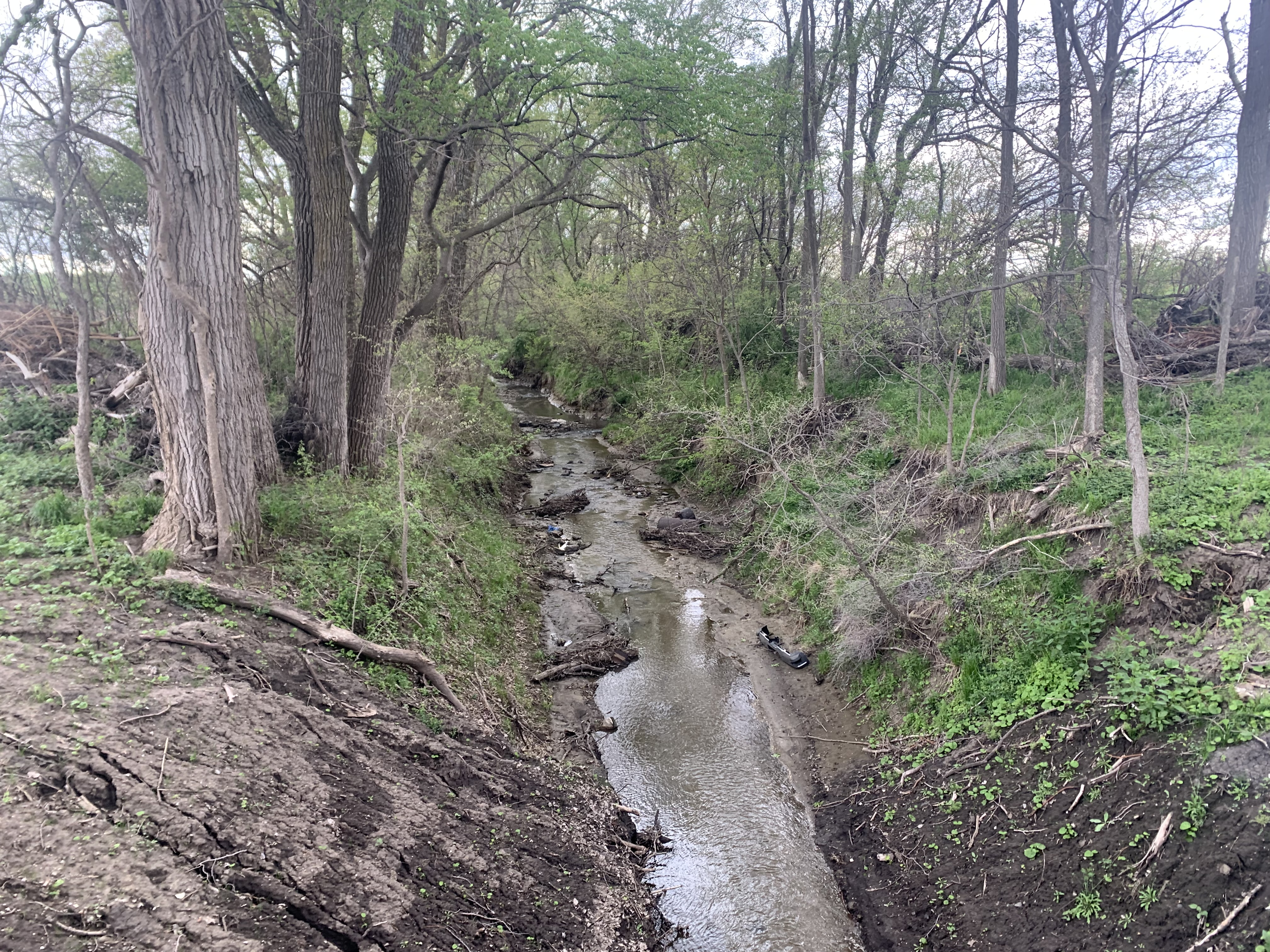
- Cuyhoga Creek at the Danube Road bridge southwest of Burlington Junction

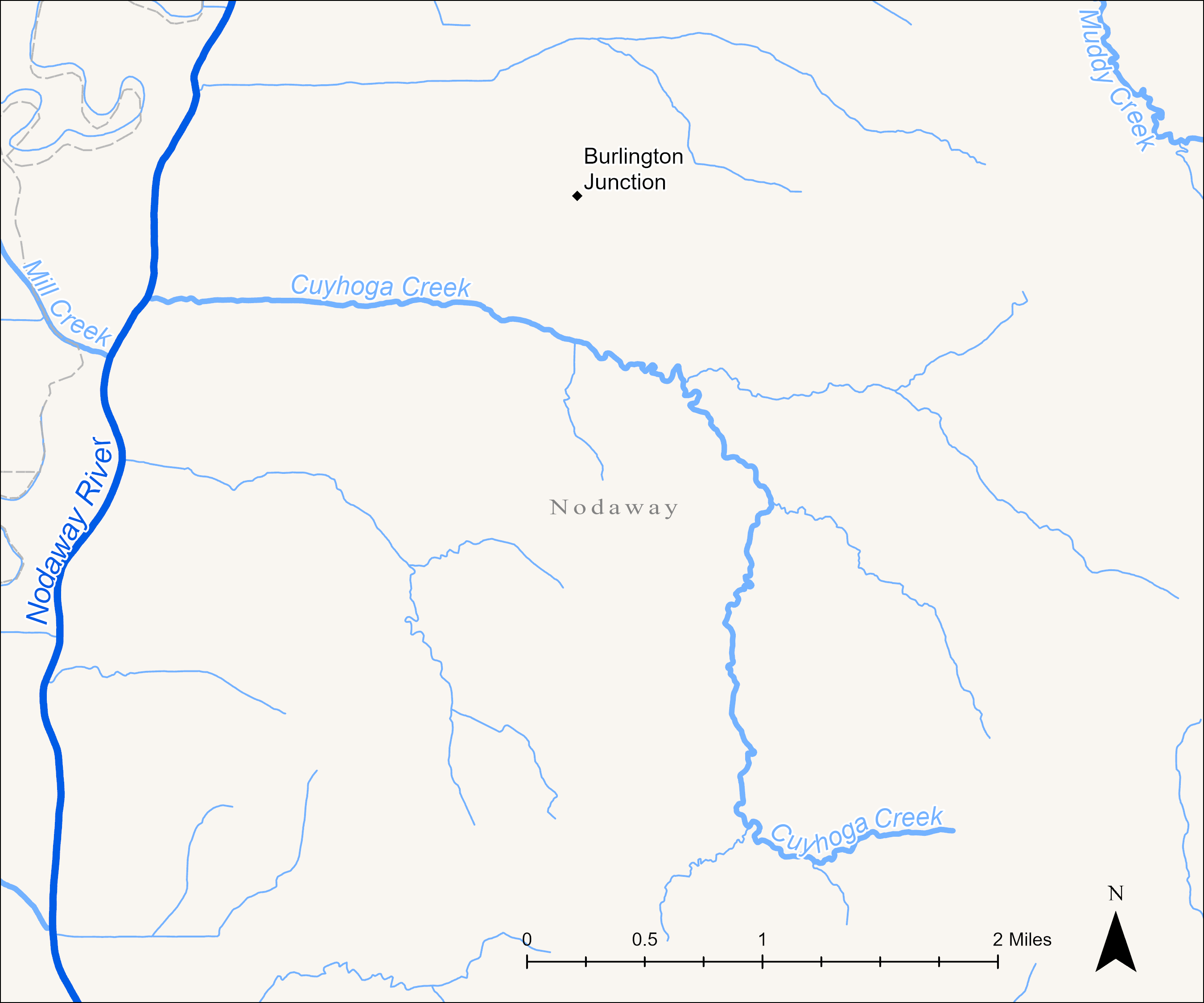
- Map of Cuyhoga Creek

Location
- Country: United States
- State: Missouri
- County: Nodaway

Physical characteristics
- Source
  - location: Nodaway Township
  - coordinates: 40°25′01″N 95°02′17″W
  - elevation: 1,115 ft (340 m)
- Mouth: Nodaway River
  - location: Nodaway Township
  - coordinates: 40°26′33″N 95°05′19″W
  - elevation: 915 ft (279 m)
- Length: 4.7 mi (7.6 km)

Basin features
- Progression: Cuyhoga Creek → Nodaway River → Missouri River → Mississippi River → Atlantic Ocean

Cuyhoga Creek is a stream in northwestern Nodaway County in the U.S. state of Missouri. It is a tributary of the Nodaway River and is 4.7 miles long. It passes through the southern portion of the city of Burlington Junction.

== Etymology ==
The name was provided by the native Indians before European settlement of the area. Multiple variant spellings of Cuyhoga existed: Cayhoga, Kihoga, and Kilhoga. Kihoga was perhaps the original and most established variant, but since the publishing of a 1939 USGS map Cuyhoga has been the exclusive spelling.

== Geography ==
Cuyhoga Creek is a left tributary of the Nodaway River and joins it 46.8 miles before its mouth in the Missouri River.

=== Course ===
The stream begins in central Nodaway Township southwest of the concurrency between US 71 and US 136. It flows northwesterly towards Burlington Junction where it passes through the southern portion of the town and deposits into the Nodaway River just west of town 0.2 miles south of the US 136 bridge over the Nodaway River.

=== Crossings ===
Cuyhoga Creek is crossed by one highway, Route 113, just south of Burlington Junction.

== See also ==
- Tributaries of the Nodaway River
- List of rivers of Missouri
