= Muddy Creek (Nodaway River tributary) =

Stream in northwest Missouri, U.S.

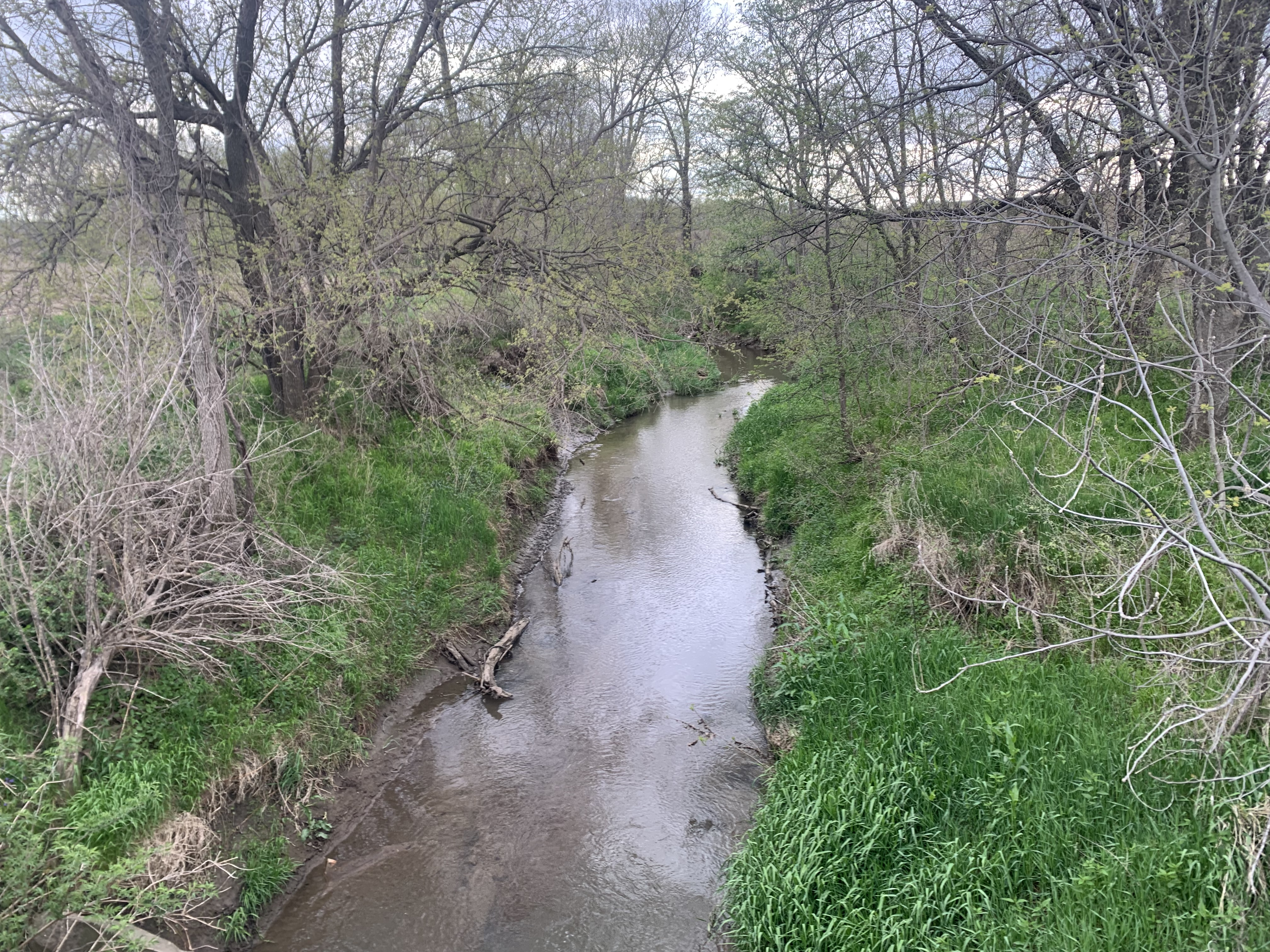
- Muddy Creek at Dynasty Road bridge in Nodaway Township

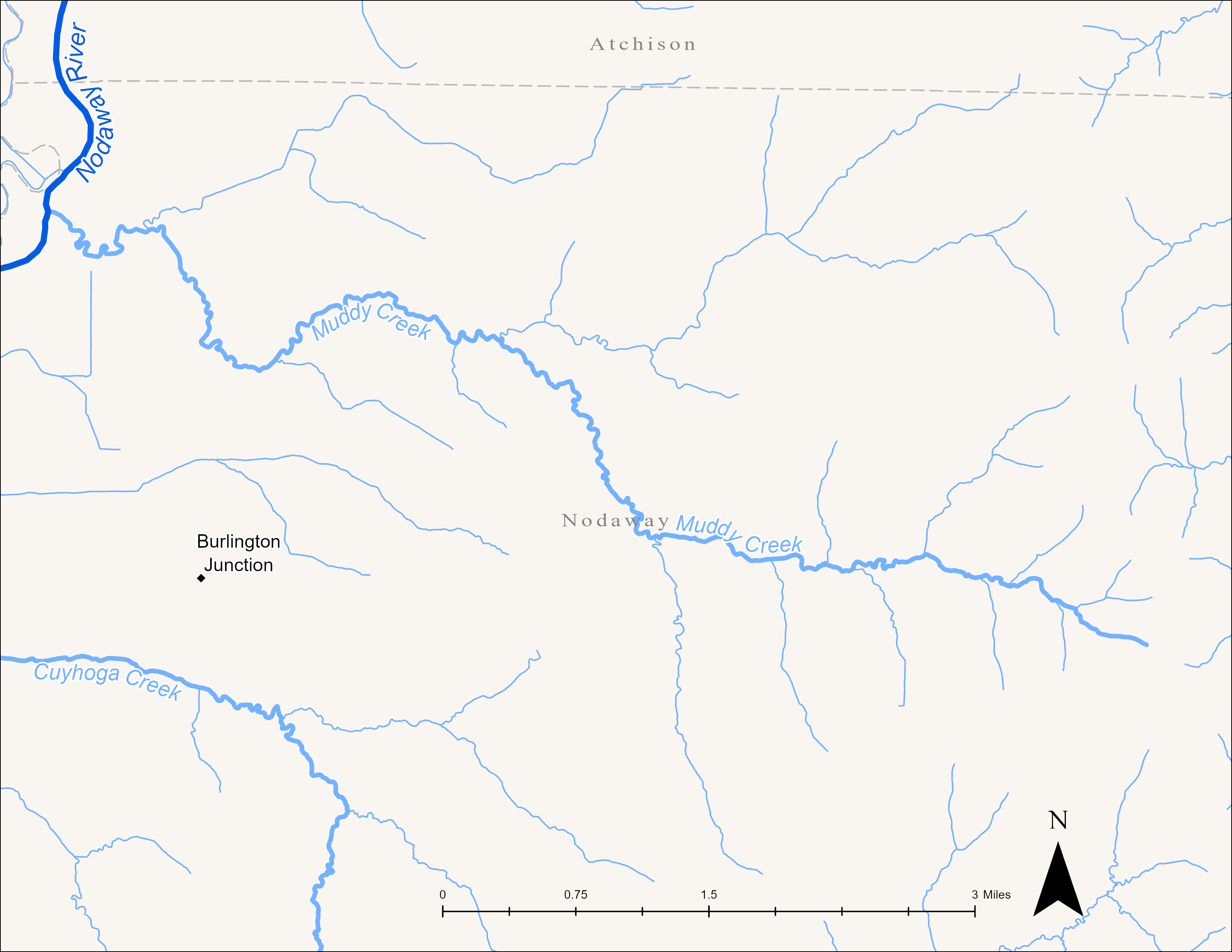
- Watershed map of Muddy Creek

Location
- Country: United States
- State: Missouri
- County: Nodaway

Physical characteristics
- Source
  - location: Nodaway Township
  - coordinates: 40°26′33″N 94°59′07″W
  - elevation: 1,115 ft (340 m)
- Mouth: Nodaway River
  - location: Nodaway Township
  - coordinates: 40°28′09″N 95°04′28″W
  - elevation: 919 ft (280 m)
- Length: 7.5 mi (12.1 km)

Basin features
- Progression: Muddy Creek → Nodaway River → Missouri River → Mississippi River → Atlantic Ocean

Muddy Creek is a stream in northwestern Nodaway County in the U.S. state of Missouri. It is a tributary of the Nodaway River and is 7.5 miles long.

== Etymology ==
Muddy Creek was so named on account of its usually muddy water.

== Geography ==
Muddy Creek is a left tributary of the Nodaway River and joins it 50.1 miles before its mouth in the Missouri River. The entire stream is within Nodaway Township, though its watershed extends slightly into Atchison Township.

=== Course ===
The stream begins just west of Toad Hollow and traverses northwesterly, passing north of Burlington Junction, to the Nodaway River.

=== Crossings ===
Muddy Creek is crossed by one highway, US Highway 71.

== Miscellaneous ==
There is a business located near Muddy Creek that takes its name.

== See also ==
- Tributaries of the Nodaway River
- List of rivers of Missouri
