= Lincoln Creek (Nodaway River tributary) =

Stream in northwest Missouri, U.S.

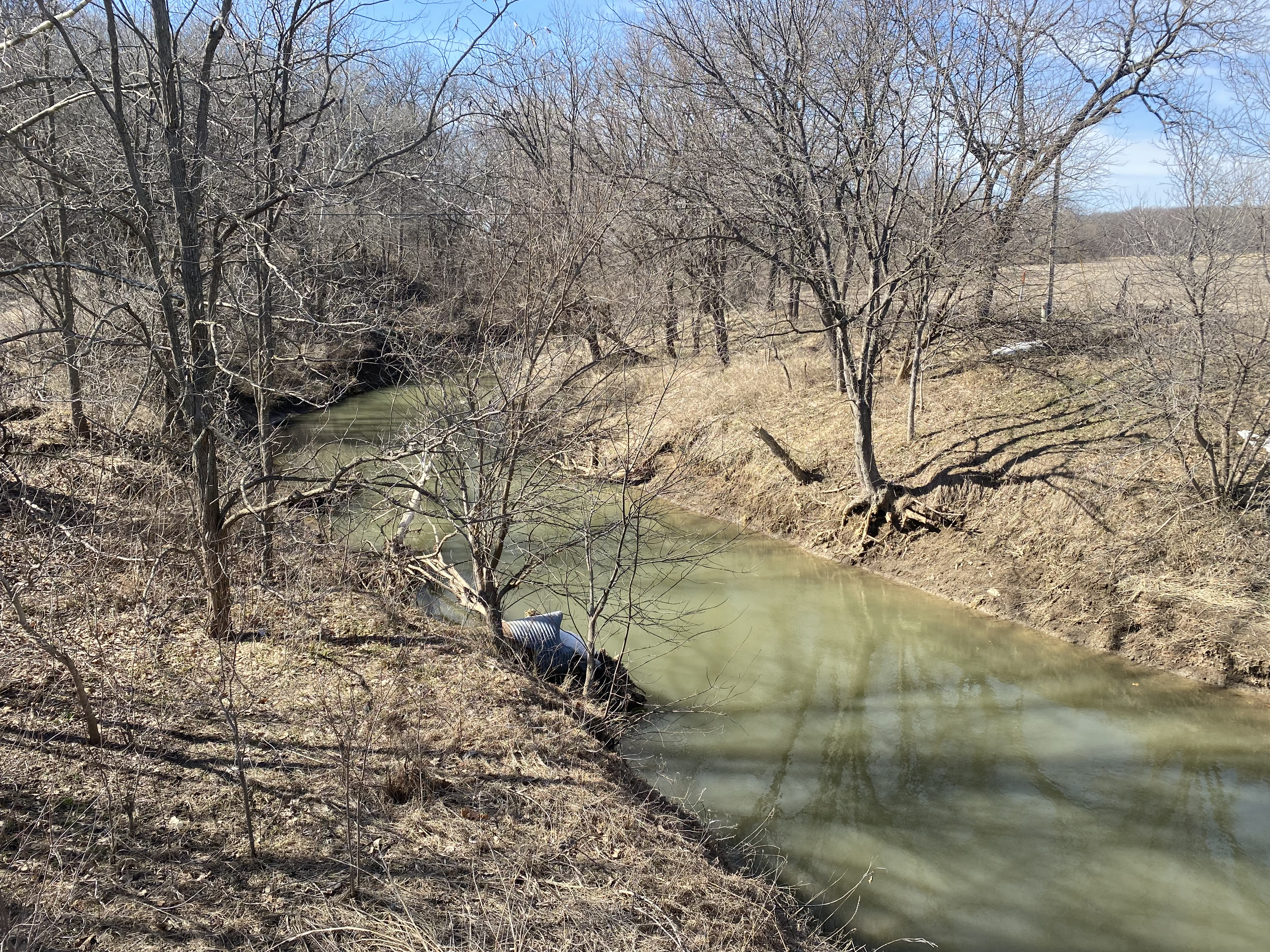
- Lincoln Creek on Route H bridge in Jackson Township

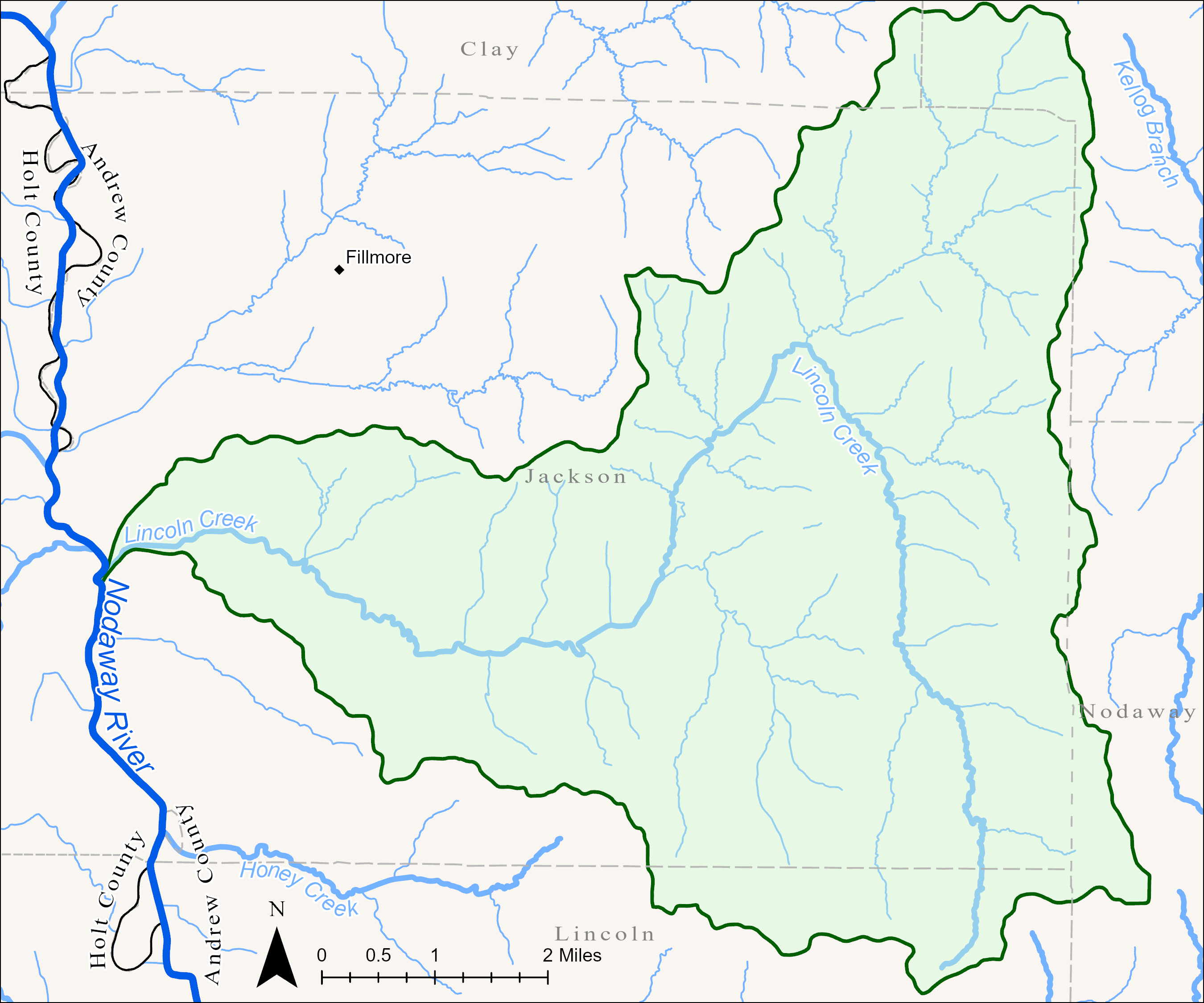
- Watershed map of Lincoln Creek

Location
- Country: United States
- State: Missouri
- County: Andrew

Physical characteristics
- Source
  - location: Lincoln Township
  - coordinates: 39°57′23″N 94°53′58″W
  - elevation: 1,140 ft (350 m)
- Mouth: Nodaway River
  - location: Jackson Township
  - coordinates: 39.994995°N 95.004140°W
  - elevation: 830 ft (250 m)
- Length: 13.8 mi (22.2 km)
- Basin size: 13.85 sq mi (35.9 km^{2})

Basin features
- Progression: Lincoln Creek → Nodaway River → Missouri River → Mississippi River → Atlantic Ocean
- Stream gradient 20.3 ft/mi (3.84 m/km)

Lincoln Creek is a stream in western Andrew County in the U.S. state of Missouri. It is a tributary of the Nodaway River and is 13.8 miles long.

== History ==
Lincoln Creek was named after John Lincoln, a member of the Lincoln family who was the proprietor of a local gristmill. It was one of the first named tributaries of the Nodaway River, being denoted as such as early as 1842.

== Geography ==
Lincoln Creek is a left tributary of the Nodaway River and joins it 10.2 miles before its mouth in the Missouri River. There are no communities in the Lincoln Creek watershed though Fillmore is close by, being about 2.5 miles northeast of its mouth, and has a permitted wastewater treatment facility that flows into Lincoln Creek.

=== Crossings ===
There are two highways that cross Lincoln Creek: US-59 and Route H. The bridge for Route H was completed in 1966.

== See also ==
- Lincoln Township, Andrew County, Missouri
- Tributaries of the Nodaway River
- List of rivers of Missouri
