= Jenkins Creek =

Jenkins Creek may refer to:

- Jenkins Creek (Flat Creek tributary), a stream in Missouri
- Jenkins Creek (Nodaway River tributary), a stream in Missouri
