= Burr Oak Creek (Nodaway River tributary) =

Stream in northwest Missouri, U.S.

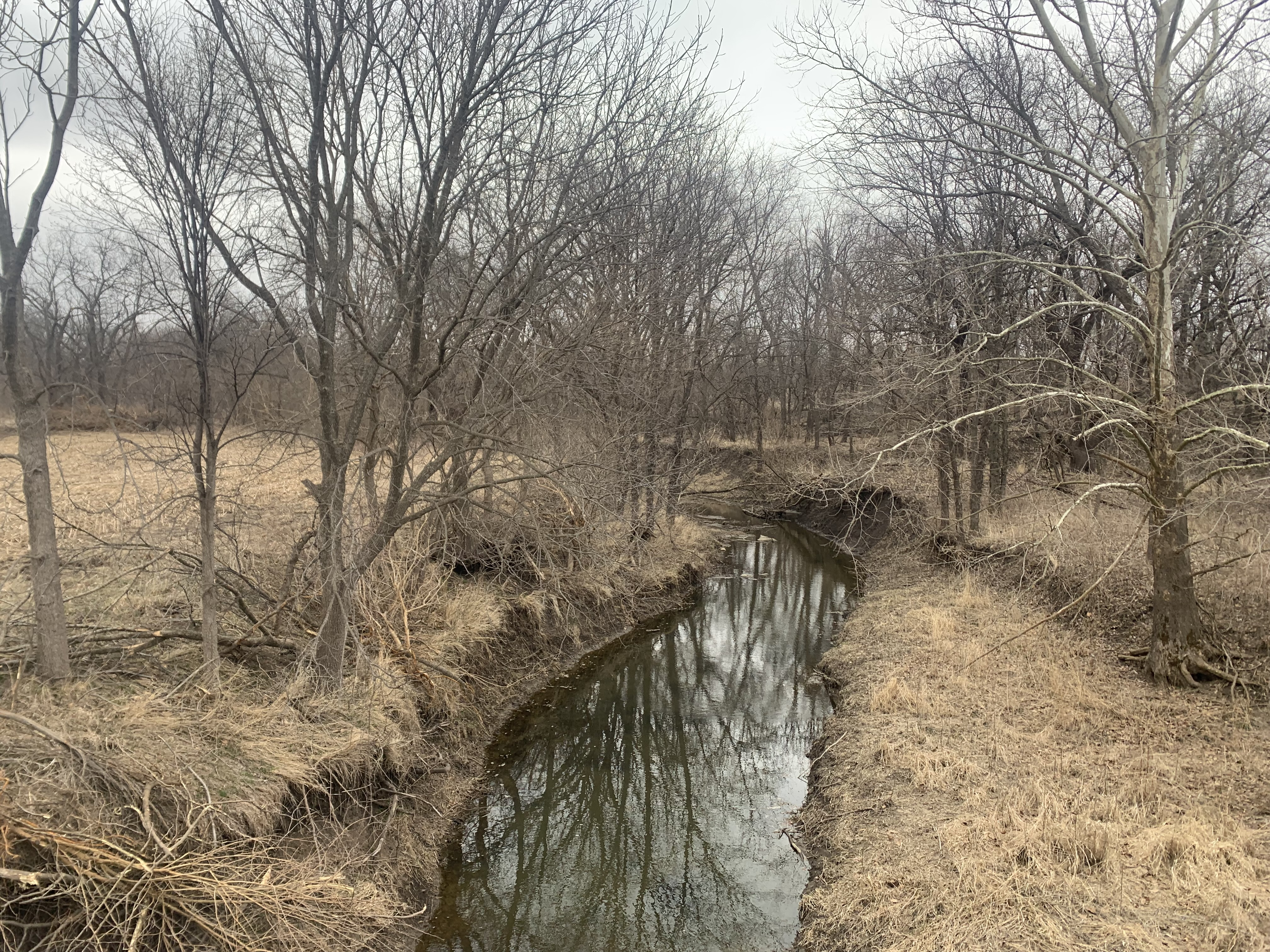
- Burr Oak Creek at Catalina Road

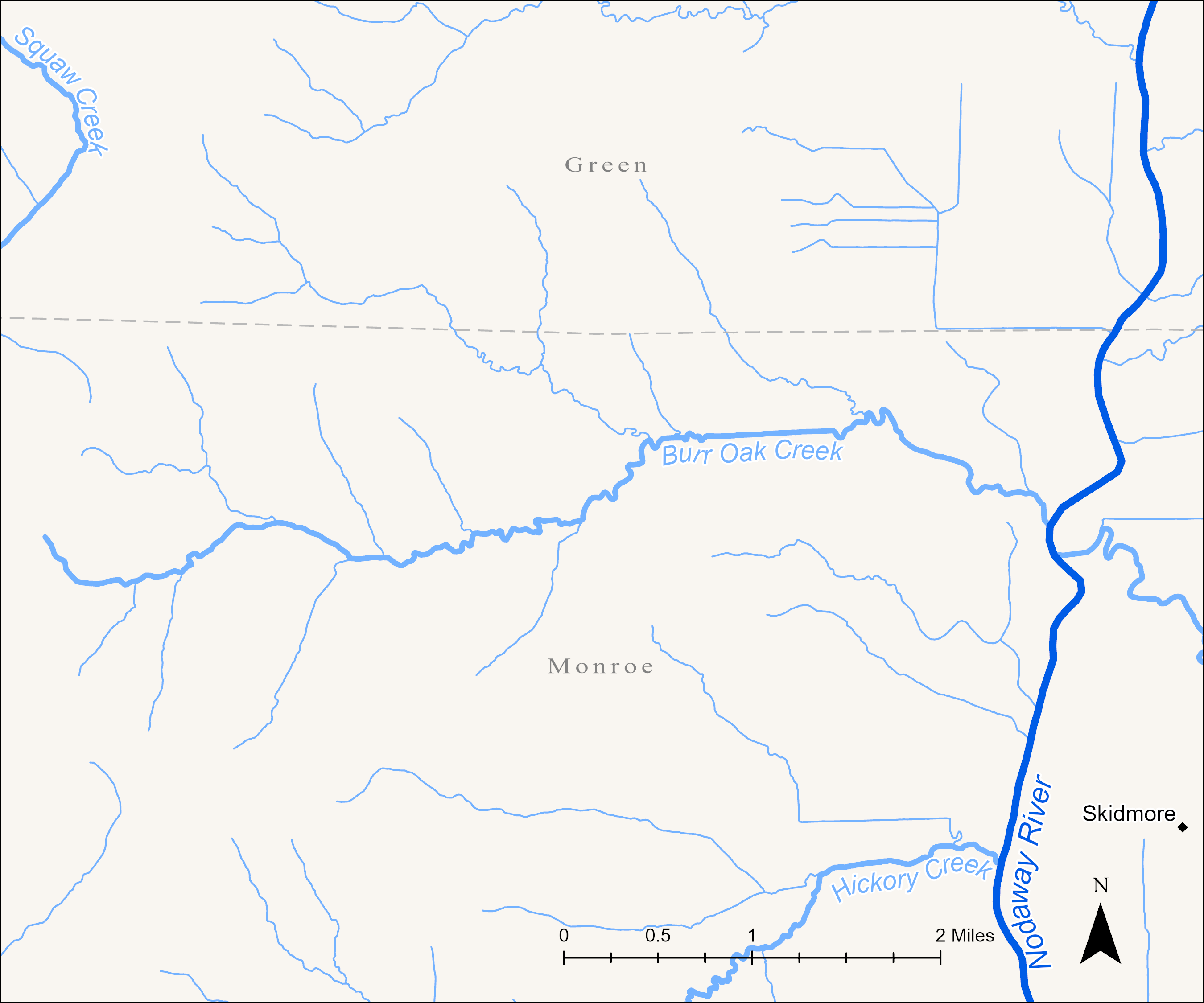
- Watershed map of Burr Oak Creek

Location
- Country: United States
- State: Missouri
- County: Nodaway

Physical characteristics
- Source
  - location: Monroe Township
  - coordinates: 40°18′23″N 95°09′51″W
  - elevation: 1,065 ft (325 m)
- Mouth: Nodaway River
  - location: Monroe Township
  - coordinates: 40°18′20″N 95°05′05″W
  - elevation: 886 ft (270 m)
- Length: 5.8 mi (9.3 km)

Basin features
- Progression: Burr Oak Creek → Nodaway River → Missouri River → Mississippi River → Atlantic Ocean

Burr Oak Creek is a stream in Nodaway County in the U.S. state of Missouri. It is a tributary of the Nodaway River and is 5.8 miles long.

== Etymology ==
Burr Oak Creek was so named on account of burr oak timber near its course.

== Geography ==
Burr Oak Creek is a right tributary of the Nodaway River and joins it 36.9 miles before its mouth in the Missouri River. The entire stream is within Monroe Township though part of its watershed reaches into southern Green Township.

=== Course ===
The creek headwaters four miles west of Skidmore and one mile east of the Atchison-Nodaway County line. The stream meanders easterly near towards the Nodaway and deposits about a mile north of Skidmore.

== See also ==
- Tributaries of the Nodaway River
- List of rivers of Missouri
