= Hickory Creek (upper Nodaway River tributary) =

Stream in northwest Missouri, U.S.

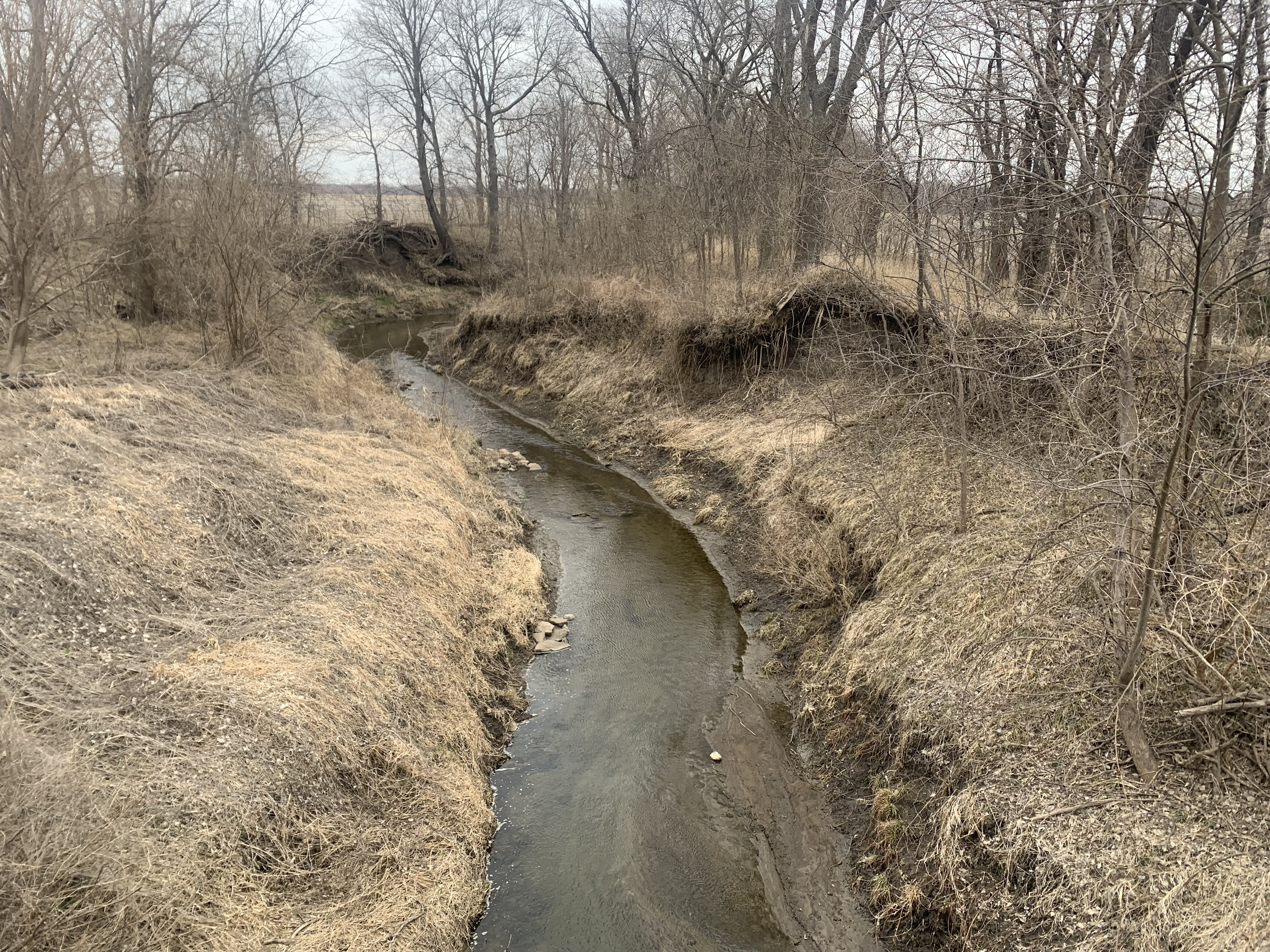
- Hickory Creek at Catalina Road in Monroe Township

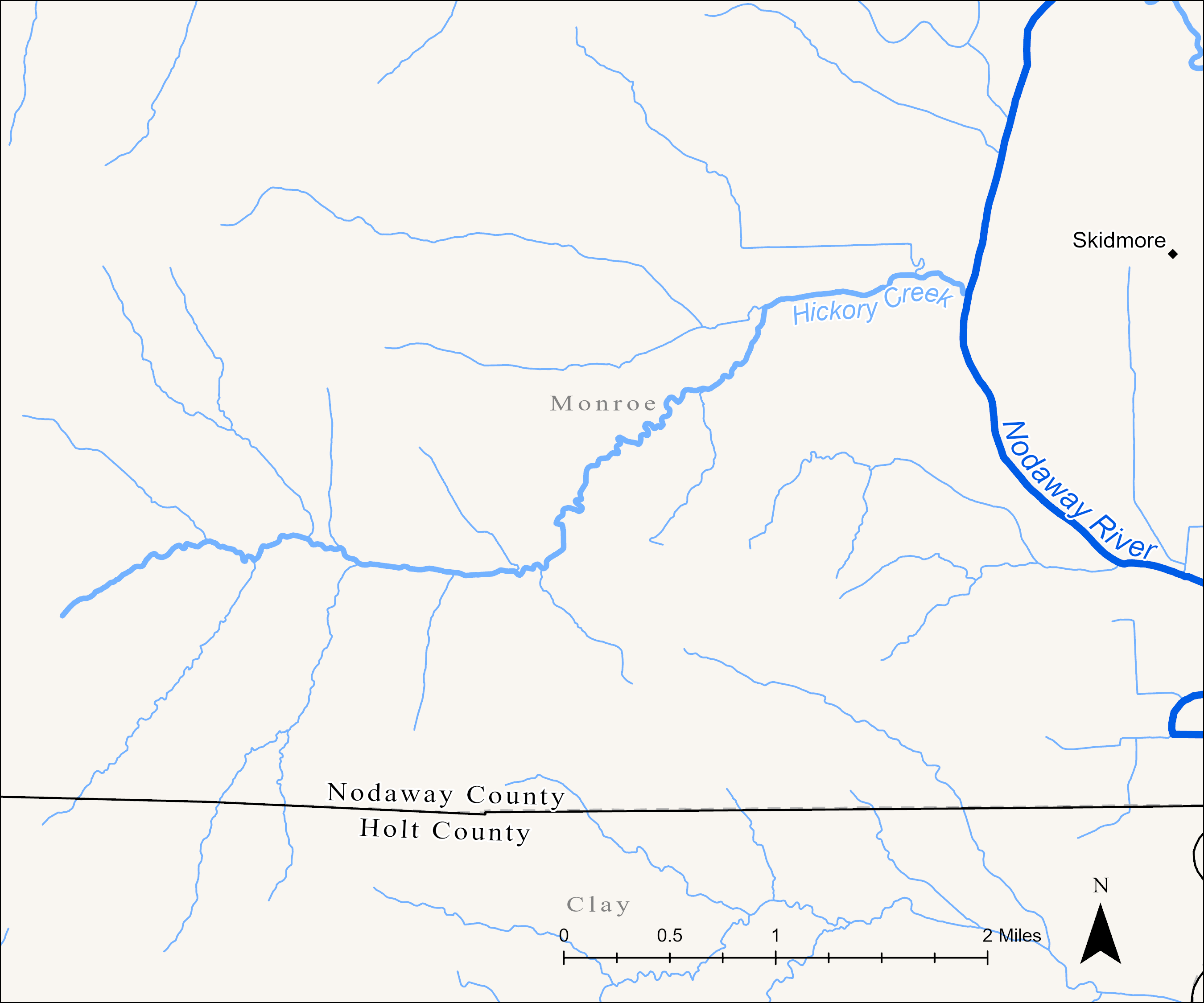
- Watershed map of Hickory Creek

Location
- Country: United States
- State: Missouri
- County: Nodaway

Physical characteristics
- Source
  - location: Monroe Township
  - coordinates: 40°16′15″N 95°09′10″W
  - elevation: 1,030 ft (310 m)
- Mouth: Nodaway River
  - location: Monroe Township
  - coordinates: 40°10′32″N 95°04′07″W
  - elevation: 869 ft (265 m)
- Length: 4.7 mi (7.6 km)

Basin features
- Progression: Hickory Creek → Nodaway River → Missouri River → Mississippi River → Atlantic Ocean

Hickory Creek is a stream in southwestern Nodaway County in the U.S. state of Missouri. It is a tributary of the Nodaway River and is 4.7 miles long. There is another larger tributary of the Nodaway River also called Hickory Creek located downstream in Holt County.

== Etymology ==
Hickory Creek was named after a nearby grove of hickory trees. Other names for this stream include Hickory Cove Creek and Hickory Grove Creek, both put forward from a 1893 plat map.

== Geography ==
Hickory Creek is a right tributary of the Nodaway River and joins it 36.1 miles upstream of its mouth in the Missouri River. The watershed is almost entirely in Monroe Township, though a small portion stretches south into Clay Township of Holt County. There are no named tributaries of Hickory Creek.

=== Course ===
Hickory Creek begins approximately 1.5 miles east-northeast of the tripoint between Atchison, Holt, and Nodaway counties. It flows easterly towards Skidmore and enters the Nodaway River just south of the Route DD bridge just west of Skidmore.

== See also ==
- Tributaries of the Nodaway River
- List of rivers of Missouri
