= Wolf Creek (Nodaway River tributary) =

Stream in northwest Missouri, U.S.

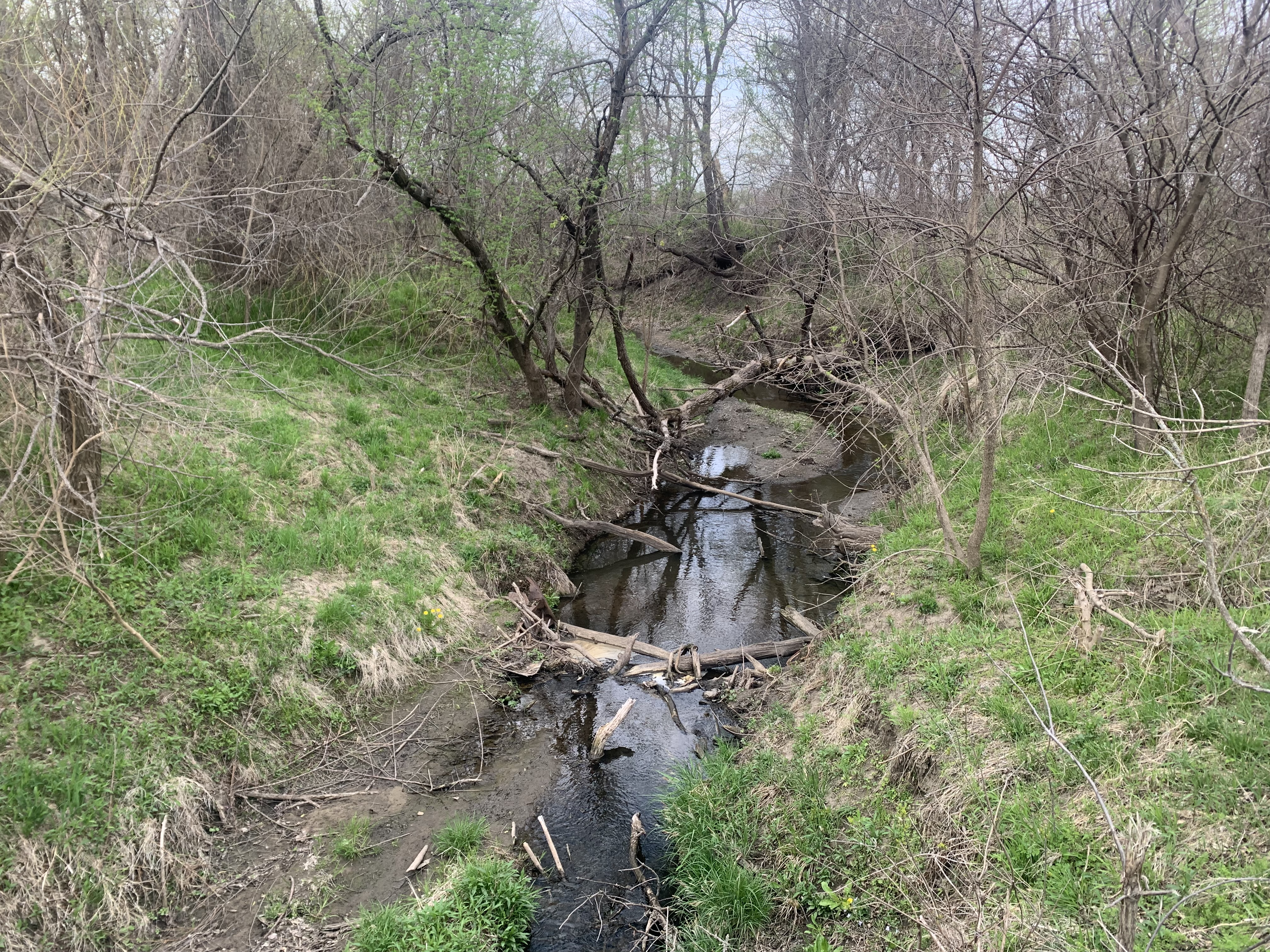
- Wolf Creek at Route JJ bridge south of Braddyville, Iowa in northern Atchison Township

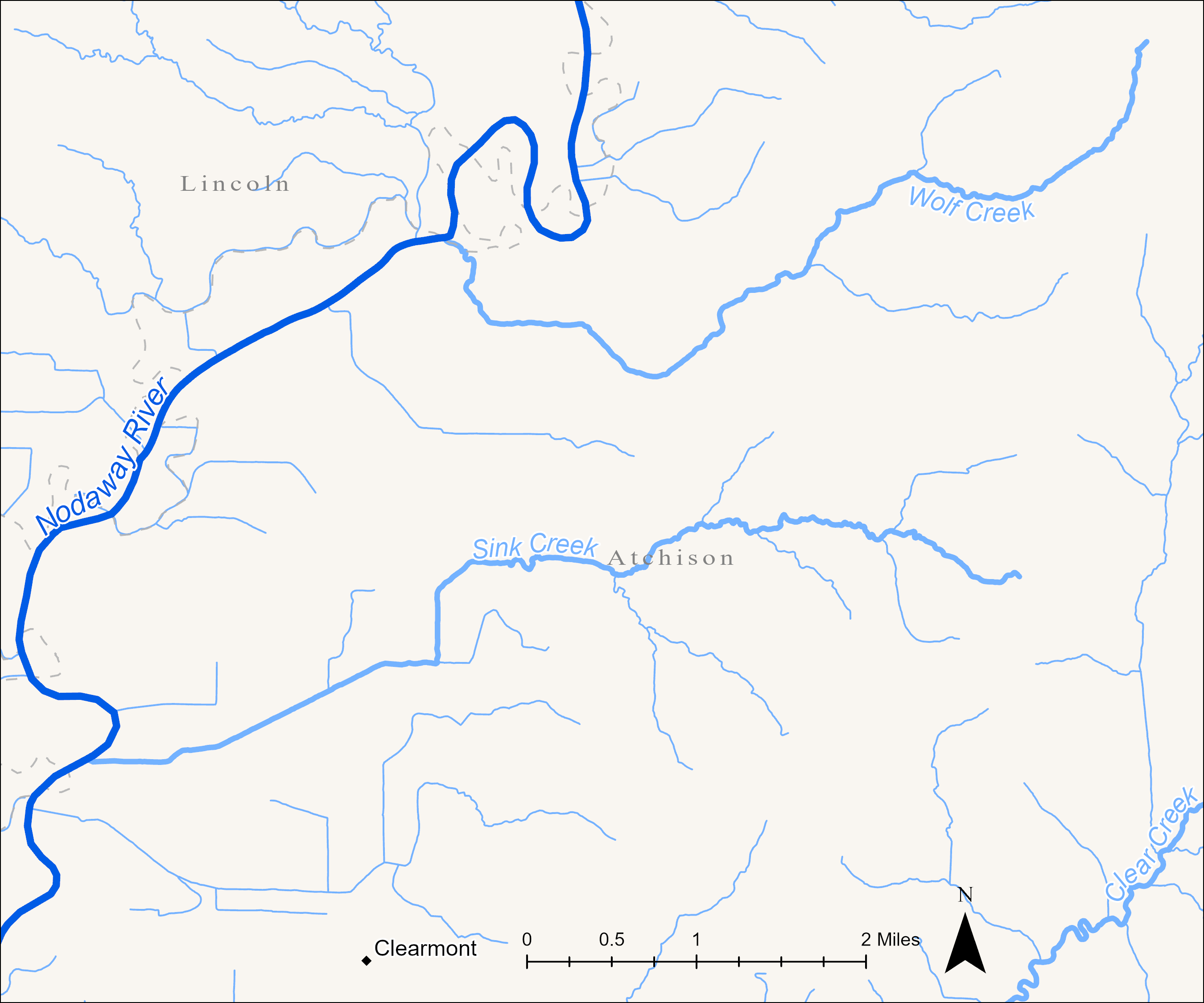

Location
- Country: United States
- State: Missouri
- County: Nodaway County, Missouri

Physical characteristics
- Source
  - location: Atchison Township
  - coordinates: 40°34′09″N 94°58′06″W
  - elevation: 1,155 ft (352 m)
- Mouth: Nodaway River
  - location: Atchison Township
  - coordinates: 40°33′21″N 95°01′49″W
  - elevation: 919 ft (280 m)
- Length: 5.6 mi (9.0 km)

Basin features
- Progression: Wolf Creek → Nodaway River → Missouri River → Mississippi River → Atlantic Ocean

Wolf Creek is a stream in northwestern Missouri in the United States. It is a tributary to the Nodaway River and is 5.6 miles long.

== Geography ==
Wolf Creek is a left tributary of the Nodaway River, and joins it 7.3 miles after its source and 58.4 miles before its mouth in the Missouri River. The stream begins about a half-mile south of the Iowa-Missouri border and progresses southwesterly towards a point south of Braddyville, Iowa and deposits in the Nodaway River near a large undulation it has a mile south of the Iowa border. Route JJ crosses the creek twice, once soon after its source and the second time right before its confluence, which occurs at the crossing of the Nodaway River by US 71.

== See also ==
- Tributaries of the Nodaway River
- List of rivers of Missouri
