= Nodaway Township, Nodaway County, Missouri =

Township in Nodaway County, Missouri, U.S.

Nodaway Township
- Township
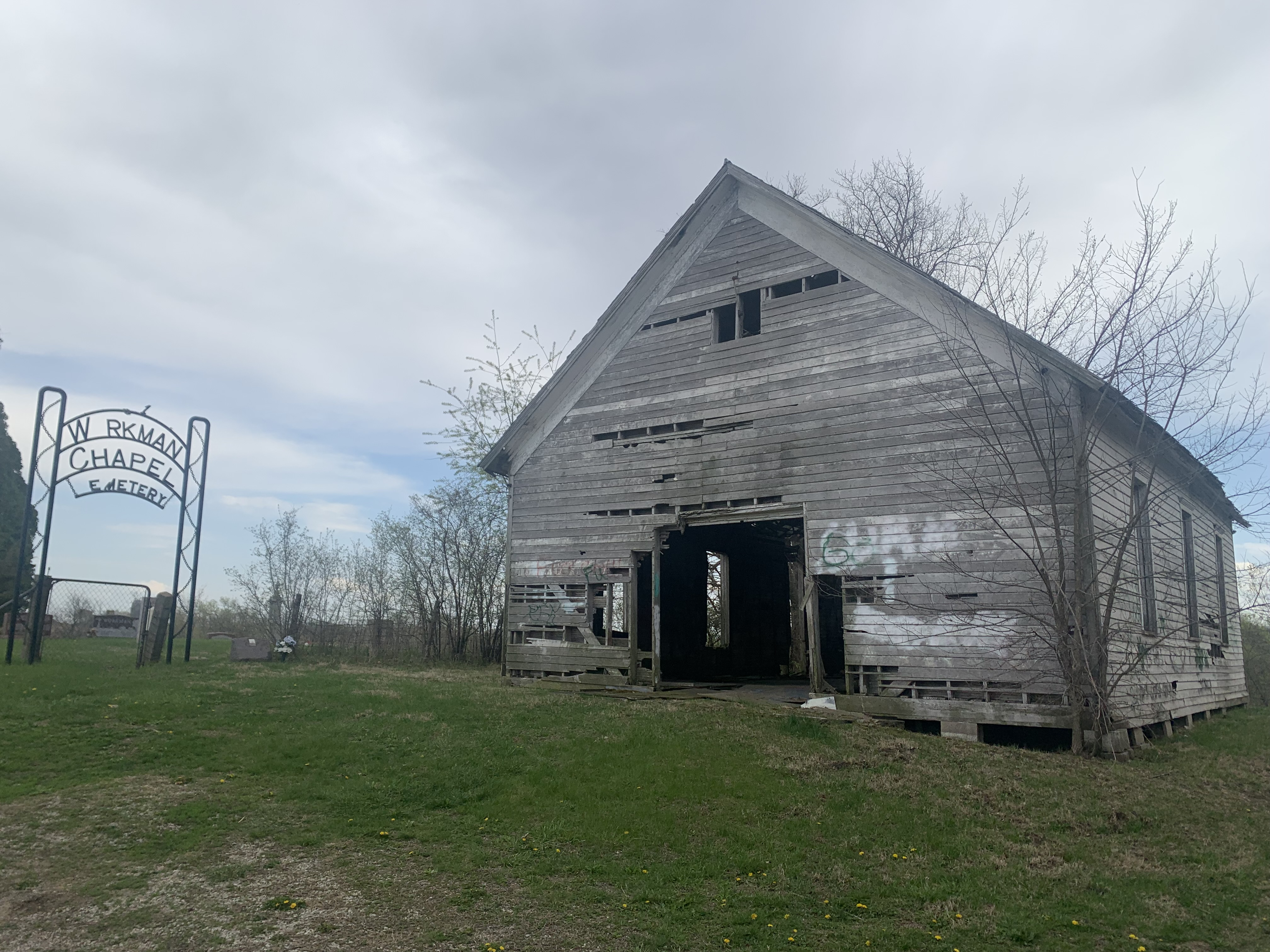
- Remnant of Workman Union Chapel and Cemetery in northeast Nodaway Township

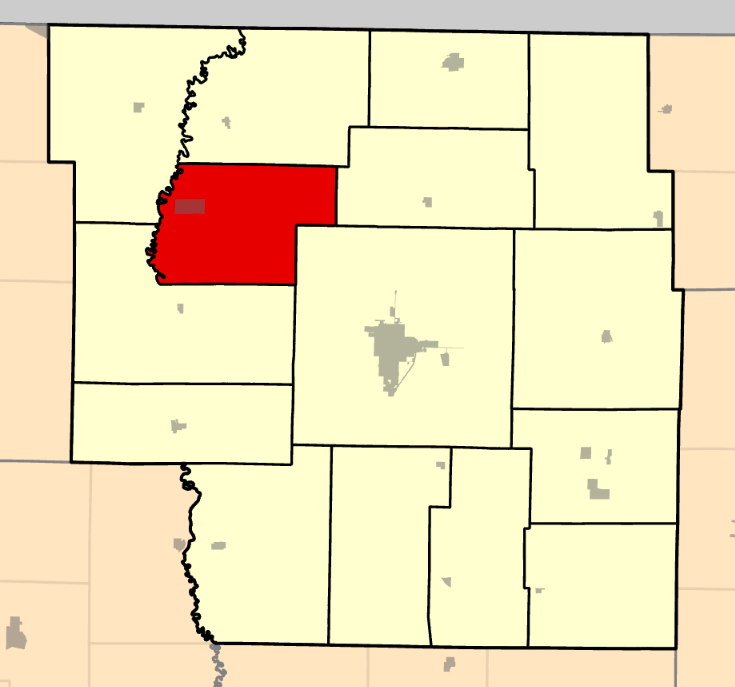
- Coordinates: 40°26′29″N 95°00′56″W
- Country: United States
- State: Missouri
- County: Nodaway
- Erected: 1871

Area
  - Total: 46.57 sq mi (120.6 km^{2})
  - Land: 46.51 sq mi (120.5 km^{2})
  - Water: 0.06 sq mi (0.16 km^{2}) 0.13%
- Elevation: 1,086 ft (331 m)

Population (2020)
  - Total: 871
  - Density: 18.7/sq mi (7.2/km^{2})
- FIPS code: 29-14752724
- GNIS feature ID: 767094

Nodaway Township is a township in Nodaway County, Missouri, United States. At the 2020 census, its population was 871. It contains 46 sections of land and is bounded on the west by the Nodaway River. The town of Burlington Junction is located west of center in the township and Wilcox lies in its southeast.

== History ==
Nodaway Township was erected on March 29, 1871, from parts of Green Township and Atchison Township and named after the Nodaway River. Later, a 6-square-mile (16 km^{2}) area was taken off the east and added to Union Township.

== Settlements ==
Roseberry was a small hamlet located one mile east of Burlington Junction but is now defunct.

== Transportation ==
The following highways travel through the township:

- U.S. Route 71
- U.S. Route 136
- Route 113
- Route AB
- Route FF
