= Possum Walk Hotel =

- U.S. National Register of Historic Places
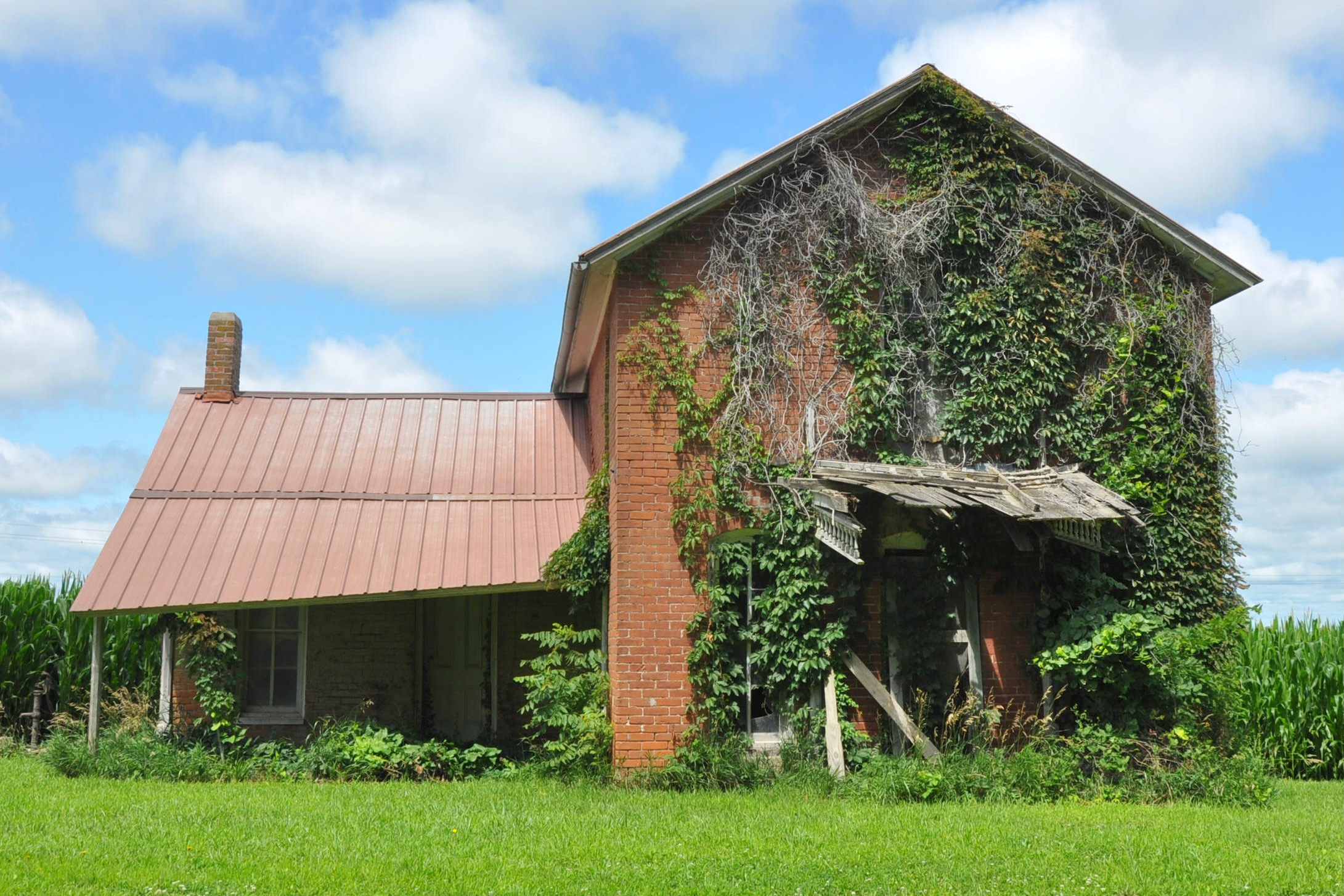
- Possum Walk Hotel in 2024

- Location within Missouri Location within the United States
- Location: North of Burlington Junction, near Burlington Junction, Missouri
- Coordinates: 40°29′46″N 95°5′10″W
- Area: less than one acre
- Built: 1873-1875
- Architect: Scott, Theodore
- Architectural style: Italianate
- NRHP reference No.: 83001033
- Added to NRHP: March 29, 1983

Possum Walk Hotel is a historic hotel building located near Burlington Junction, Nodaway County, Missouri. It was built between 1873 and 1875, and is a two-story, Italianate style "L"-plan brick building. It features a long shed roof porch on the facade of the ell extension and a small porch with balcony at the main entrance.

It was listed on the National Register of Historic Places in 1983.
