= Roseberry, Missouri =

Extinct hamlet in Missouri, U.S.

Coordinates: 40°26′16″N 95°02′27″W

Roseberry is an extinct hamlet in northwestern Nodaway County, in the U.S. state of Missouri. It was situated one mile east of Burlington Junction.

Roseberry was platted on October 27th, 1879 at the junction of the Wabash Railroad with the old Clarinda Branch. It was named after Matthew Roseberry, a promoter of the town site. Subsequently, when the junction of the Burlington and Wabash lines was created at Burlington Junction, Roseberry became defunct. There is nothing remaining from the hamlet.
