= Nodaway, Missouri =

Census-designated place in Andrew County, Missouri, United States

- Census-designated place
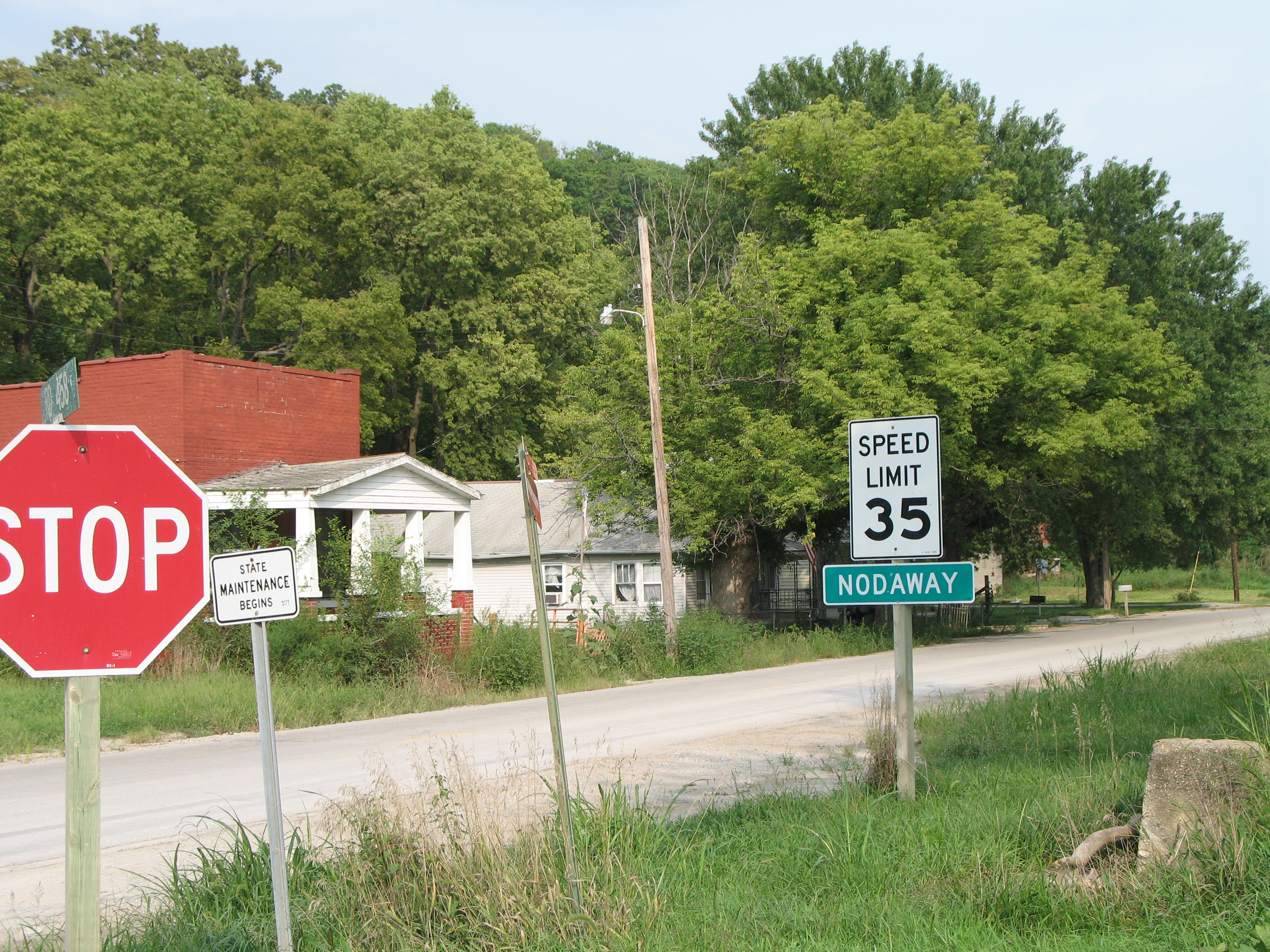
- Street scene in Nodaway

- Location within the state of Missouri
- Coordinates: 39°54′47″N 94°58′12″W
- Country: United States
- State: Missouri
- County: Nodaway
- Township: Lincoln
- Established: 1868
- Elevation: 912 ft (278 m)
- Time zone: UTC-6 (Central (CST))
  - Summer (DST): UTC-5 (CDT)
- GNIS feature ID: 2587097

Nodaway (/ˈnɒdəweɪ/ NOD-ə-way) is a census-designated place (CDP) in Lincoln Township, Andrew County, Missouri, United States. The community is part of the St. Joseph, MO–KS Metropolitan Statistical Area.

== History ==
Nodaway was founded in 1868, and named after the nearby Nodaway River. A post office called Nodaway was established in 1868, and remained in operation until 1957.

== Geography ==
The community is located along Missouri Route T just north of the confluence of the Nodaway and Missouri rivers approximately one mile northeast of the community of Amazonia.

Southeast of the community of Nodaway and southwest of Amazonia was Nodaway Island, a large meander in the floodplain of Missouri River in southwestern Andrew County
