= Lincoln Township, Andrew County, Missouri =

Township in Andrew County, Missouri, U.S.

Lincoln Township
- Township
- Coordinates: 39°54′41″N 94°55′27″W
- Country: United States
- State: Missouri
- County: Andrew

Area
  - Total: 44.46 sq mi (115.2 km^{2})
  - Land: 43.79 sq mi (113.4 km^{2})
  - Water: 0.67 sq mi (1.7 km^{2}) 1.51%
- Elevation: 942 ft (287 m)

Population (2020)
  - Total: 1,113
  - Density: 25.4/sq mi (9.8/km^{2})
- FIPS code: 29-00342572
- GNIS feature ID: 766225

Lincoln Township is a township in Andrew County, Missouri, United States. At the 2020 census, its population was 1113.

Lincoln Township was named after John Lincoln, a member of the Lincoln family who settled the area.

== Geography ==
Lincoln Township covers an area of 44.46 square miles (115.15 km^{2}) and contains one incorporated municipality, Amazonia. It contains three cemeteries: Greenwick, Hackberry, and Old Union.

The streams of Caples Creek, Hopkins Creek, Mill Creek, and the Nodaway River run through this township.

Worthwine Island, an island of the Missouri River, is located in the southern portion of Lincoln Township and is within the Worthwine Island Conservation Area.

== Transportation ==
The following highways travel through the township:

- Interstate 29
- U.S. Route 59
- Route CC
- Route K
- Route RA
- Route T
