= Braddyville, Iowa =

- City
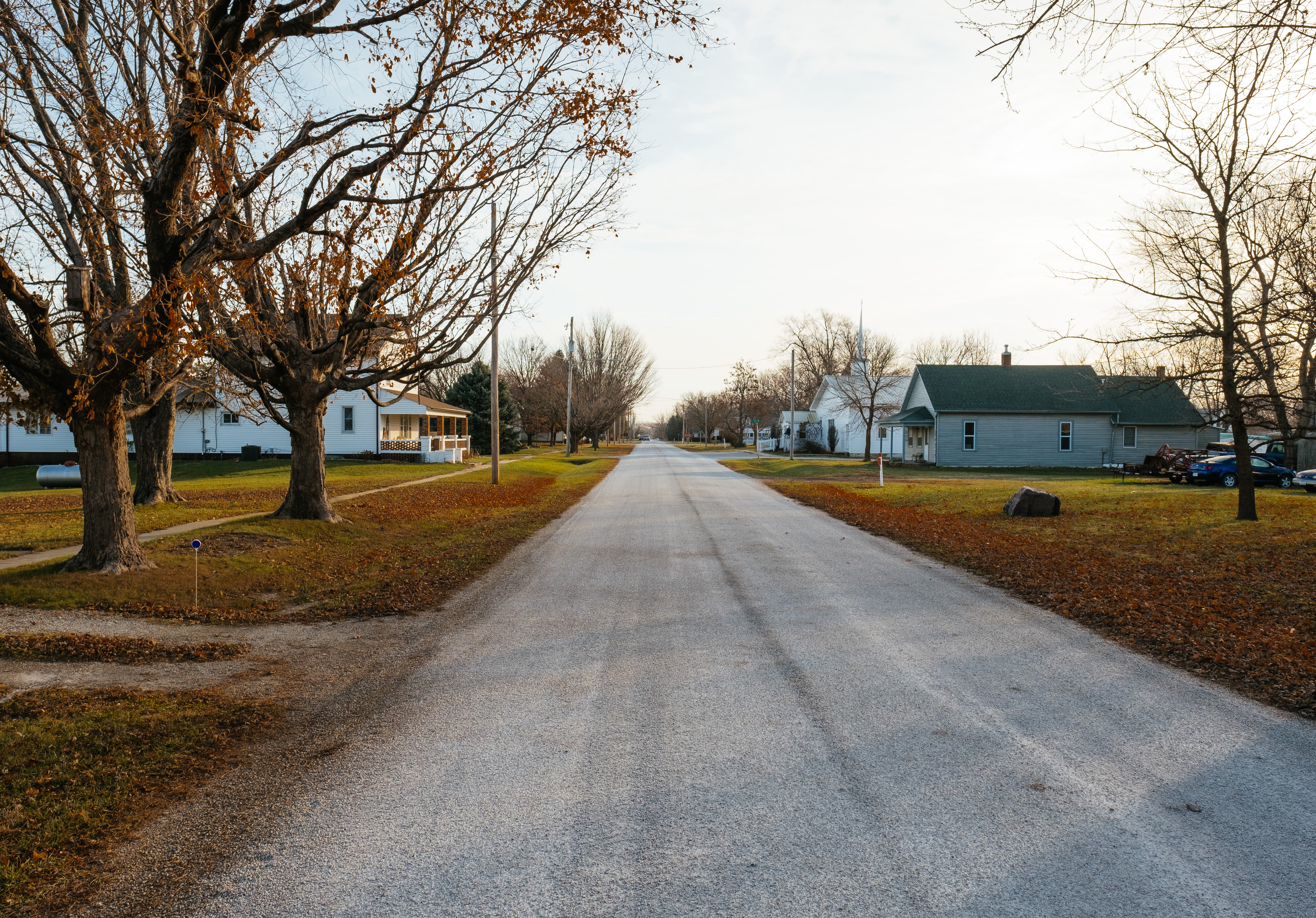
- Looking east on Mulberry Street

- Location of Braddyville, Iowa
- Coordinates: 40°34′50″N 95°01′52″W
- Country: USA
- State: Iowa
- County: Page

Area
  - Total: 0.56 sq mi (1.45 km^{2})
  - Land: 0.56 sq mi (1.45 km^{2})
  - Water: 0 sq mi (0.00 km^{2})
- Elevation: 1,001 ft (305 m)

Population (2020)
  - Total: 147
  - Density: 263.3/sq mi (101.66/km^{2})
- Time zone: UTC-6 (Central (CST))
  - Summer (DST): UTC-5 (CDT)
- ZIP code: 51631
- Area code: 712
- FIPS code: 19-07930
- GNIS feature ID: 2394234

Braddyville is a city in Page County, Iowa, United States. The population was 147 at the 2020 census.

== History ==
Braddyville was laid out in the 1870s as a depot on the Chicago, Burlington and Quincy Railroad. It was named for its founder, James Braddy.

== Geography ==
Braddyville is located on the Iowa-Missouri state line, along the Nodaway River.

According to the United States Census Bureau, the city has a total area of 0.53 square miles (1.37 km^{2}), all land.

== Demographics ==
Historical populations
Year	Pop.	±%
1880	214	—
1890	175	−18.2%
1900	236	+34.9%
1910	283	+19.9%
1920	294	+3.9%
1930	267	−9.2%
1940	242	−9.4%
1950	249	+2.9%
1960	176	−29.3%
1970	207	+17.6%
1980	199	−3.9%
1990	219	+10.1%
2000	176	−19.6%
2010	159	−9.7%
2020	147	−7.5%
Source:"U.S. Census website". United States Census Bureau. and Iowa Data Center; Source: U.S. Decennial Census

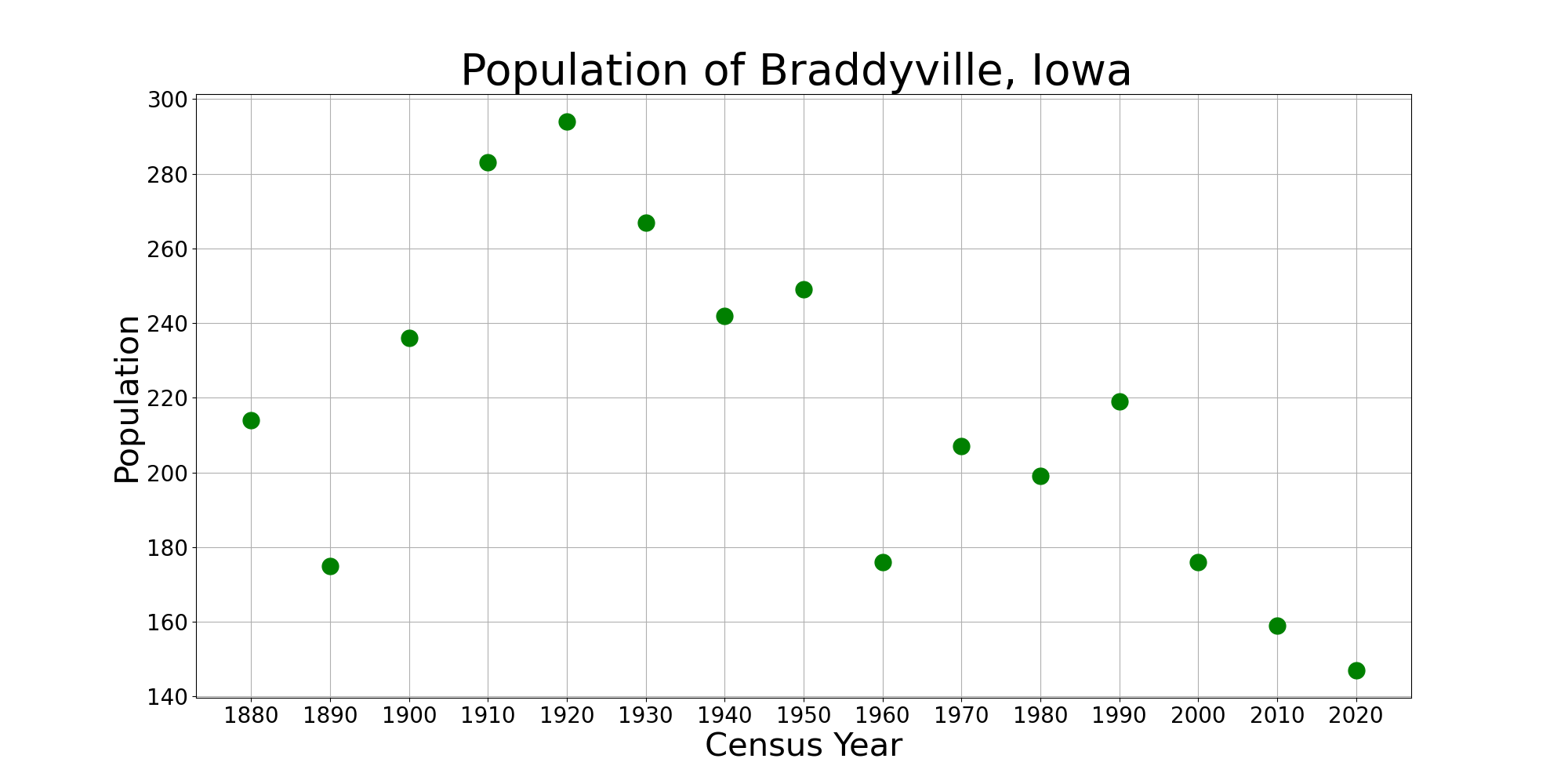
The population of Braddyville, Iowa from US census data

=== 2020 census ===
As of the census of 2020, there were 147 people, 68 households, and 50 families residing in the city. The population density was 263.3 inhabitants per square mile (101.7/km^{2}). There were 79 housing units at an average density of 141.5 per square mile (54.6/km^{2}). The racial makeup of the city was 94.6% White, 0.0% Black or African American, 0.0% Native American, 0.0% Asian, 0.0% Pacific Islander, 1.4% from other races and 4.1% from two or more races. Hispanic or Latino people of any race comprised 2.0% of the population.

Of the 68 households, 33.8% of which had children under the age of 18 living with them, 50.0% were married couples living together, 10.3% were cohabitating couples, 22.1% had a female householder with no spouse or partner present and 17.6% had a male householder with no spouse or partner present. 26.5% of all households were non-families. 19.1% of all households were made up of individuals, 13.2% had someone living alone who was 65 years old or older.

The median age in the city was 47.2 years. 24.5% of the residents were under the age of 20; 5.4% were between the ages of 20 and 24; 19.0% were from 25 and 44; 23.8% were from 45 and 64; and 27.2% were 65 years of age or older. The gender makeup of the city was 48.3% male and 51.7% female.

=== 2010 census ===
As of the census of 2010, there were 159 people, 75 households, and 45 families living in the city. The population density was 300.0 inhabitants per square mile (115.8/km^{2}). There were 82 housing units at an average density of 154.7 per square mile (59.7/km^{2}). The racial makeup of the city was 98.1% White and 1.9% from two or more races. Hispanic or Latino of any race were 2.5% of the population.

There were 75 households, of which 24.0% had children under the age of 18 living with them, 46.7% were married couples living together, 5.3% had a female householder with no husband present, 8.0% had a male householder with no wife present, and 40.0% were non-families. 34.7% of all households were made up of individuals, and 13.3% had someone living alone who was 65 years of age or older. The average household size was 2.12 and the average family size was 2.71.

The median age in the city was 50.5 years. 19.5% of residents were under the age of 18; 5.7% were between the ages of 18 and 24; 17.6% were from 25 to 44; 35.3% were from 45 to 64; and 22% were 65 years of age or older. The gender makeup of the city was 55.3% male and 44.7% female.

=== 2000 census ===
As of the census of 2000, there were 176 people, 75 households, and 53 families living in the city. The population density was 331.7 inhabitants per square mile (128.1/km^{2}). There were 83 housing units at an average density of 156.4 per square mile (60.4/km^{2}). The racial makeup of the city was 99.43% White and 0.57% Asian.

There were 75 households, out of which 41.3% had children under the age of 18 living with them, 53.3% were married couples living together, 13.3% had a female householder with no husband present, and 29.3% were non-families. 24.0% of all households were made up of individuals, and 9.3% had someone living alone who was 65 years of age or older. The average household size was 2.35 and the average family size was 2.77.

27.3% were under the age of 18, 7.4% from 18 to 24, 24.4% from 25 to 44, 25.0% from 45 to 64, and 15.9% who were 65 years of age or older. The median age was 39 years. For every 100 females, there were 104.7 males. For every 100 females age 18 and over, there were 96.9 males.

The median income for a household in the city was $37,917, and the median income for a family was $44,000. Males had a median income of $26,944 versus $32,188 for females. The per capita income for the city was $18,421. 4.9% of the population and 4.3% of families were below the poverty line. Out of the total population, none of those under the age of 18 and 8.7% of those 65 and older were living below the poverty line.

== Education ==
Braddyville is served by the South Page Community Schools.
