= Monroe Township, Nodaway County, Missouri =

Township in Nodaway County, Missouri, U.S.

Monroe Township
- Township
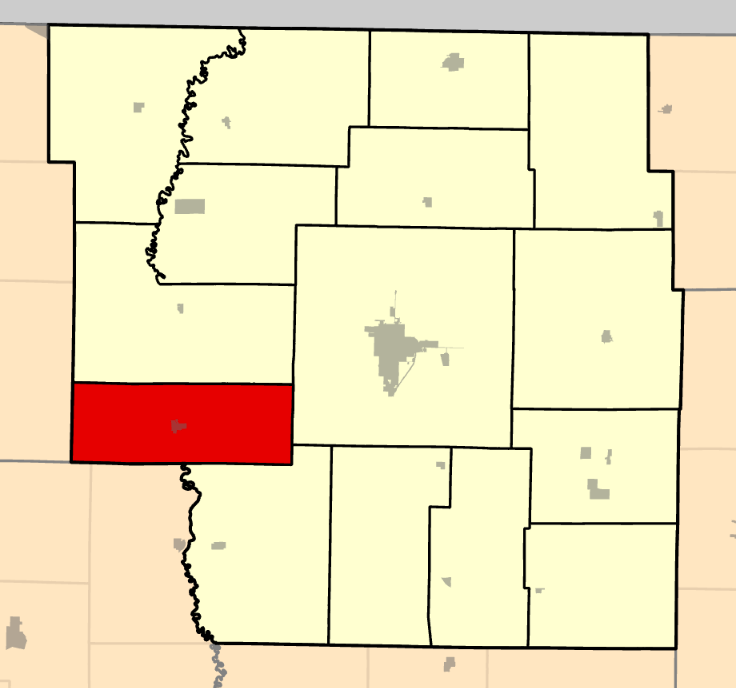
- Coordinates: 40°17′22″N 95°04′25″W
- Country: United States
- State: Missouri
- County: Nodaway
- Erected: 1881

Area
  - Total: 44.19 sq mi (114.5 km^{2})
  - Land: 44.16 sq mi (114.4 km^{2})
  - Water: 0.03 sq mi (0.078 km^{2}) 0.07%
- Elevation: 955 ft (291 m)

Population (2020)
  - Total: 407
  - Density: 9.2/sq mi (3.6/km^{2})
- FIPS code: 29-14749376
- GNIS feature ID: 767093

Monroe Township is a township in Nodaway County, Missouri, United States. At the 2020 census, its population was 407. It comprises 44 sections of land. The city of Skidmore, which lies in its center, is the only settlement in the township.

== History ==
Monroe Township was erected on February 12, 1881, from parts of Green Township and Hughes Township because inhabitants complained of traveling too far to vote. It was named after President James Monroe.

== Geography ==
The Nodaway River bisects Monroe Township north-south just to the west of Skidmore. Route 113 also travels north-south, passing through Skidmore as Elm and Walnut Street and crosses the Nodaway River south of town.

== Transportation ==
The following highways travel through the township:

- Route 113
- Route DD
- Route V
- Route ZZ
