= Jenkins Creek (Nodaway River tributary) =

Stream in Missouri, U.S.

Jenkins Creek Rains Creek
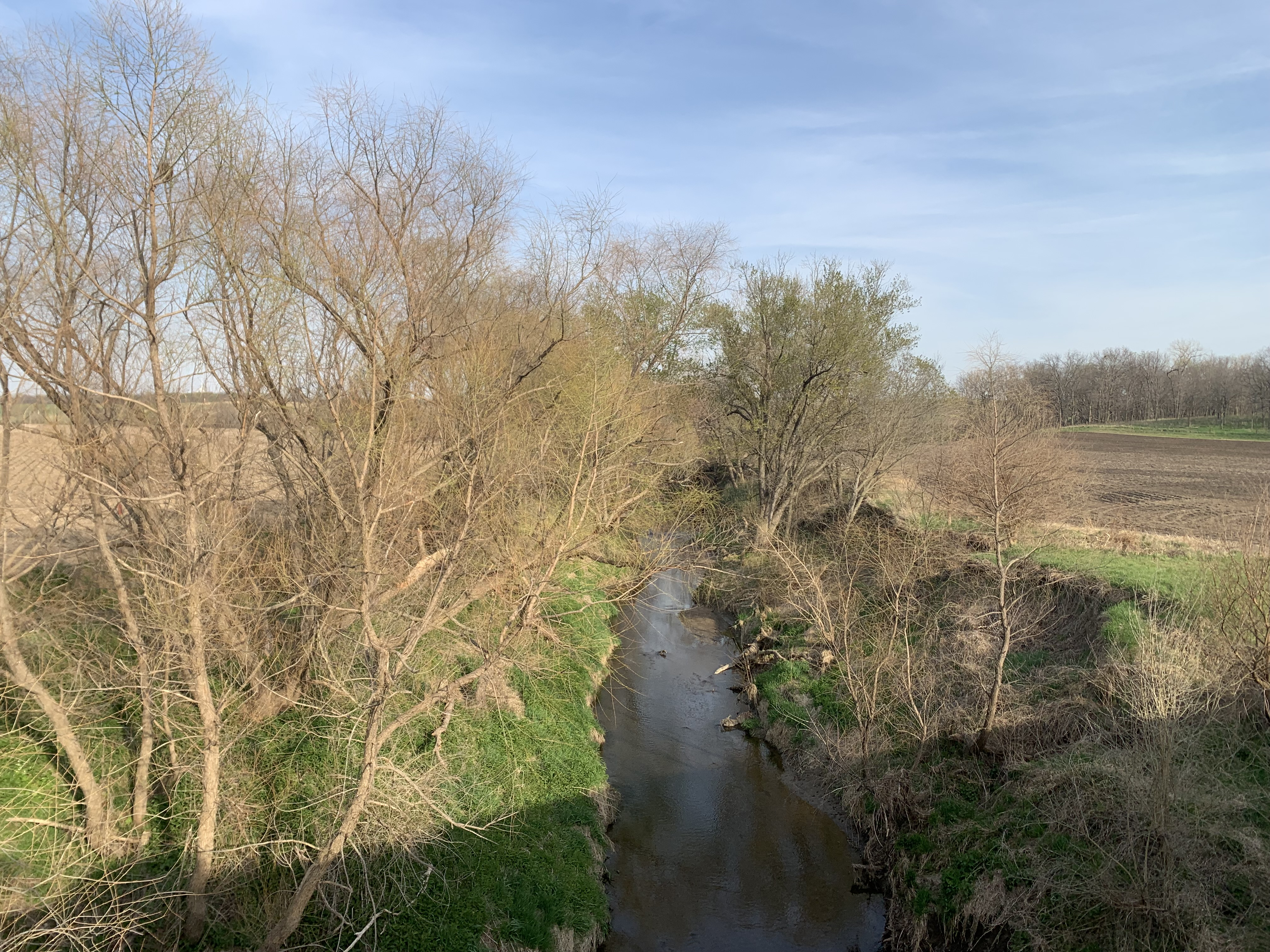
- Jenkins Creek on Route Y bridge southeast of Graham

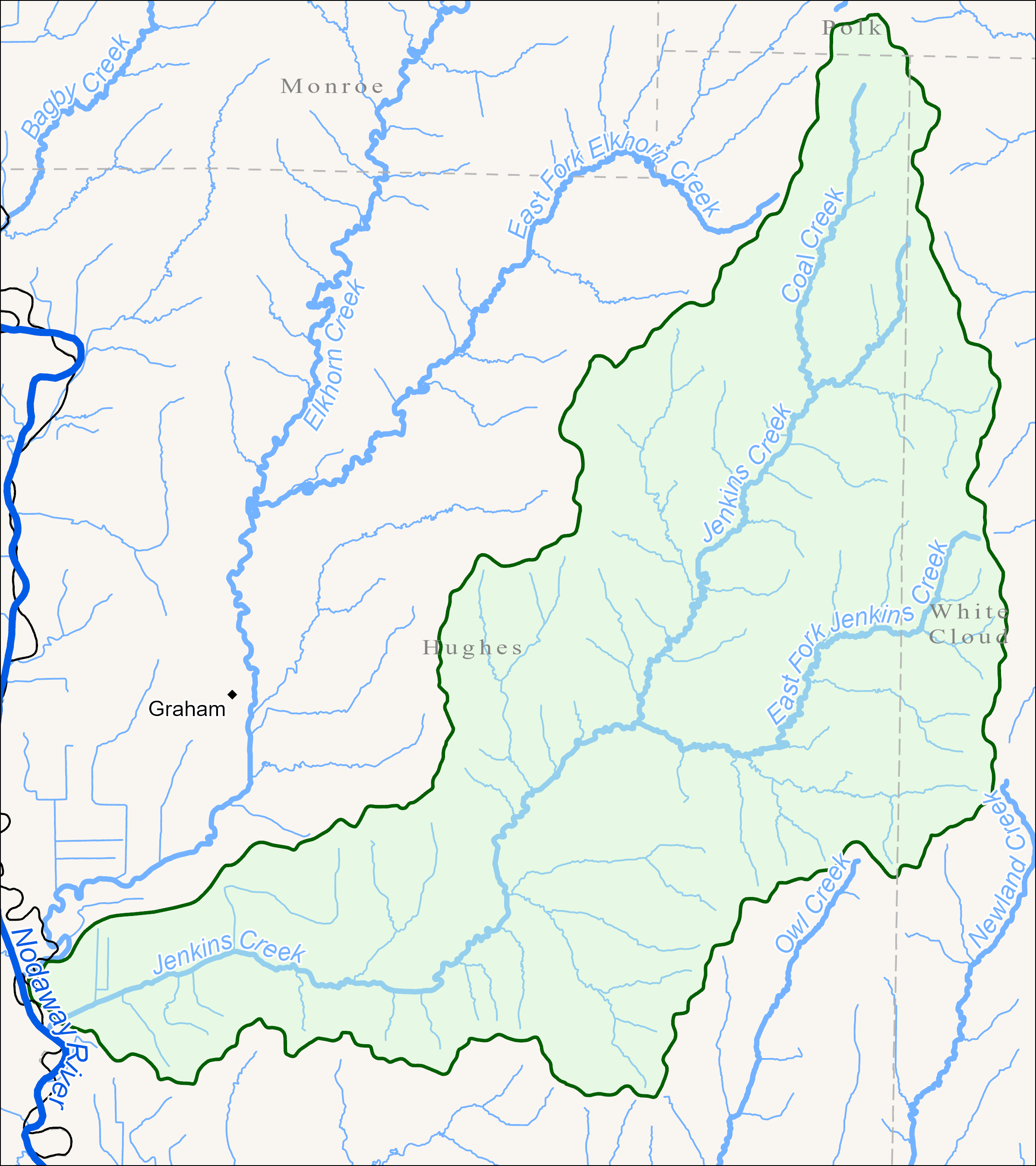
- Watershed map of Jenkins Creek

Location
- Country: United States
- State: Missouri
- County: Nodaway

Physical characteristics
- Source
  - location: White Cloud Township
  - coordinates: 40°15′15″N 94°55′58″W
  - elevation: 1,095 ft (334 m)
- Mouth: Nodaway River
  - location: Hughes Township
  - coordinates: 40°10′32″N 95°04′07″W
  - elevation: 866 ft (264 m)
- Length: 13.2 mi (21.2 km)
- Basin size: 27 sq mi (70 km^{2})

Basin features
- Progression: Jenkins Creek → Nodaway River → Missouri River → Mississippi River → Atlantic Ocean
- Stream gradient 17.4 ft/mi (3.30 m/km)

Jenkins Creek is a stream in Nodaway County in the U.S. state of Missouri. It is a tributary of the Nodaway River and is 13.2 miles long.

== History ==
Its earliest name was Rain Creek (or Rains Creek), but the name Jenkins Creek first appeared on a 1926 USGS map. The last recorded use of Rain Creek was in a 1930 plat map.

== Geography ==
Jenkins Creek is a left tributary of the Nodaway River and joins it 25.3 miles before its mouth in the Missouri River. There are no communities in its watershed. It is the last notable tributary of the Nodaway River in Nodaway County.

=== Course ===
It begins about 6 miles southwest of Maryville, then travels south-southwest for over five miles until it is due east of Graham. Jenkins Creek then begins a more west-southwest direction, where it is met with some bluffs on its southern side before it joins the Nodaway River about 2.5 miles southeast of Maitland.

=== Tributaries ===
There are two tributaries of this stream named East Fork Jenkins Creek and Coal Creek.

=== Crossings ===
Three highways cross Jenkins Creek: Route A, Route H, and Route Y.

=== Miscellaneous ===
Dozens of wind turbines of the White Cloud Wind Farm are located in the northern portion of the Jenkins Creek watershed.

== See also ==
- Tributaries of the Nodaway River
- List of rivers of Missouri
