= Missouri Route 113 =

State highway in Missouri, U.S.

Route 113
- MO 113 highlighted in red

Route information
- Maintained by MoDOT
- Length: 26.216 mi (42.191 km)

Major junctions
- South end: US 59 east of Mound City
- Route 46 south of Quitman
- North end: US 136 in Burlington Junction

Location
- Country: United States
- State: Missouri
- Counties: Holt, Nodaway

Highway system
- Missouri State Highway System; Interstate; US; State; Supplemental
← Route 112	→ Route 114

Route 113 is a highway in northwestern Missouri. Its northern terminus is at U.S. Route 136 in Burlington Junction; its southern terminus is at U.S. Route 59 east of Mound City.

== Route description ==
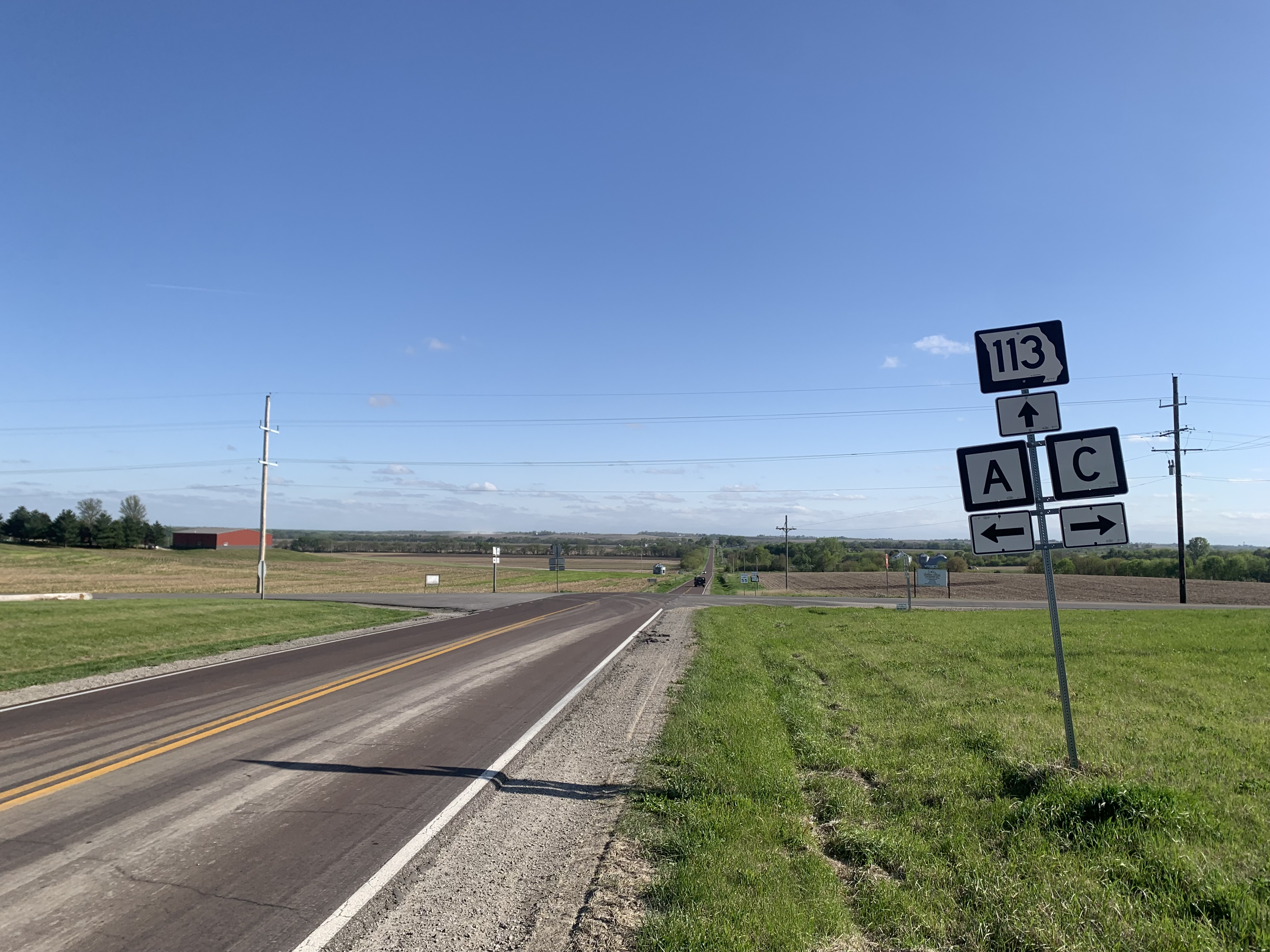
Route 113 west of Maitland, facing south

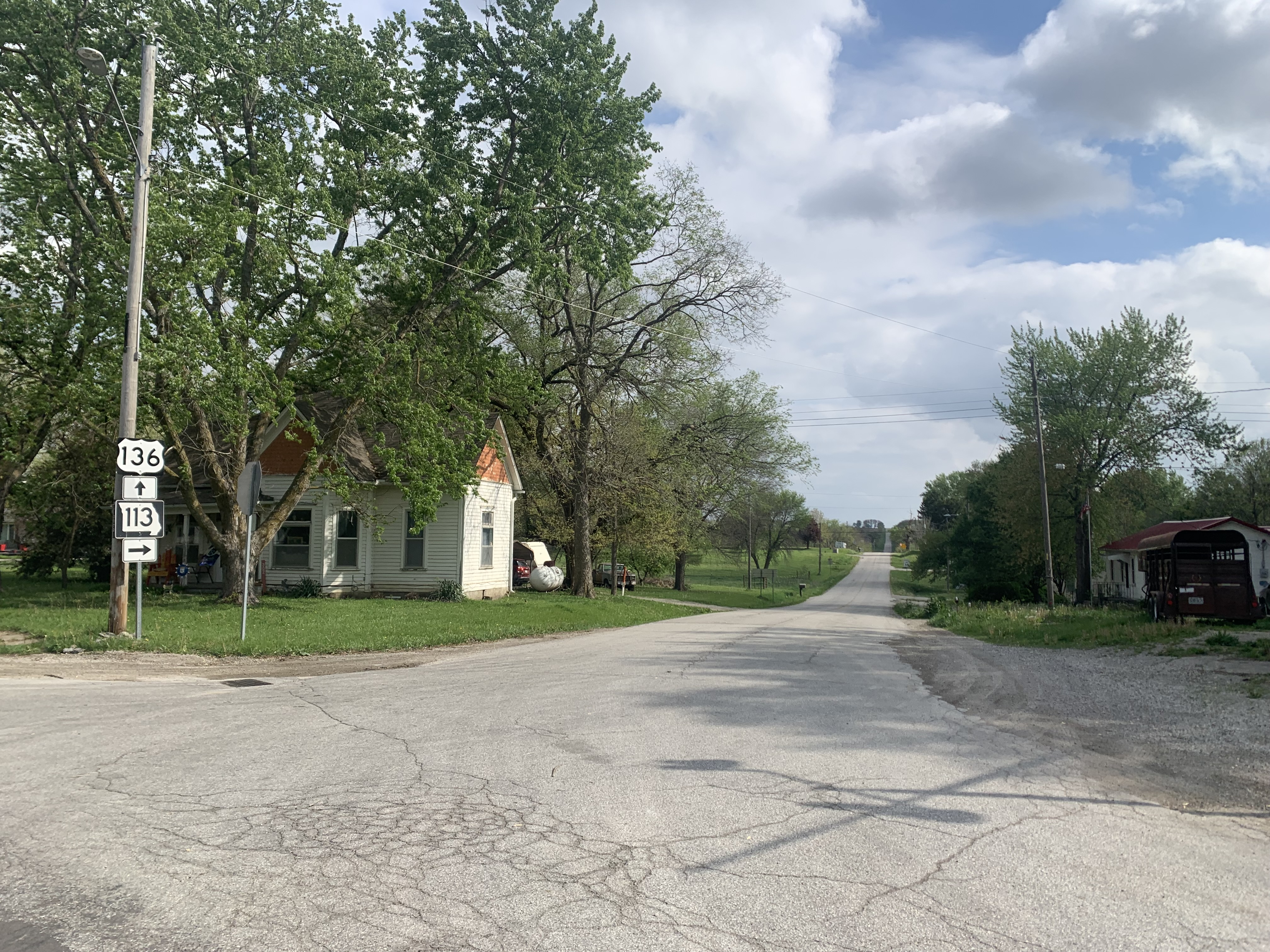
Northern Terminus of Route 113 in Burlington Junction

Beginning at the southern terminus with US 59 in Holt County, the highway travels approximately 5 miles (8.0 km) east and curves northward at its intersection with Route B, which is historically known as Campbell Corner. Continuing north, the highway travels 5 miles (8.0 km) then intersects with Route A and Route C, where Maitland lies just east. Continuing another 4 miles (6.4 km), the highway crosses into Nodaway County, and an additional mile later, the road curves northeast where the highway crosses the Nodaway River.

Immediately after, it reverts to north and comes into Skidmore where it junctions with Route D at the town center. After a right turn at a stop sign, the highway travels east through the town and curves northward after exiting Skidmore, where it intersects with Route V. Thereafter, it crosses Florida Creek after 2 miles (3.2 km); 2 miles (3.2 km) further, it intersects with Route 46. Then it travels north-northwest almost 2 miles (3.2 km) until it passes through the now unincorporated community of Quitman. After a large sweeping right and then left curve, the highway continues north about 3.5 miles (5.6 km) to its northern terminus in Burlington Junction with US 136.

== Major intersections ==
County	Location	mi	km	Destinations	Notes
Holt	Hickory Township	0.000	0.000	US 59 – Mound City, Oregon	
Holt	Hickory Township	0.113	0.182	Route D	
Holt	Hickory Township	3.094	4.979	Route B – New Point	Access to Nodaway Valley Conservation Area
Holt	Hickory Township	8.035	12.931	Route A / Route C – Maitland	
Nodaway	Skidmore	14.012	22.550	Route DD (Walnut Street)	
Nodaway	Monroe Township	14.821	23.852	Route V – Maryville	Access to Mosaic Medical Center in Maryville
Nodaway	Green Township	18.053	29.053	Route 46 – Maryville, Fairfax	Access to Bilby Ranch Lake Conservation Area; access to Northwest Missouri Regional Airport
Nodaway	Burlington Junction	26.216	42.191	US 136 (Main Street)	
1.000 mi = 1.609 km; 1.000 km = 0.621 mi
