= Nodaway River =

River in Iowa and Missouri, U.S.

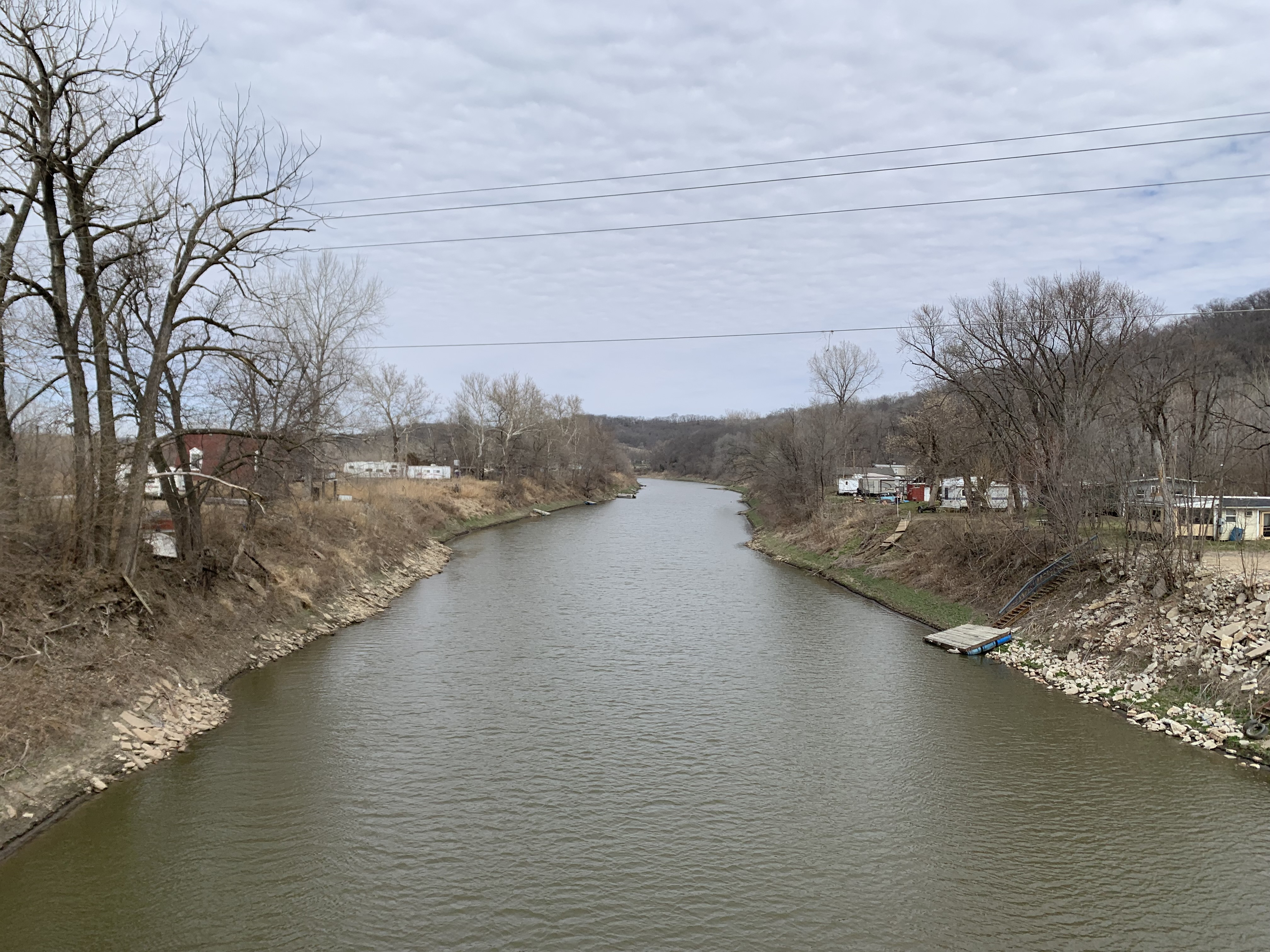
- The Nodaway River in Andrew County, about one mile from its mouth, facing north

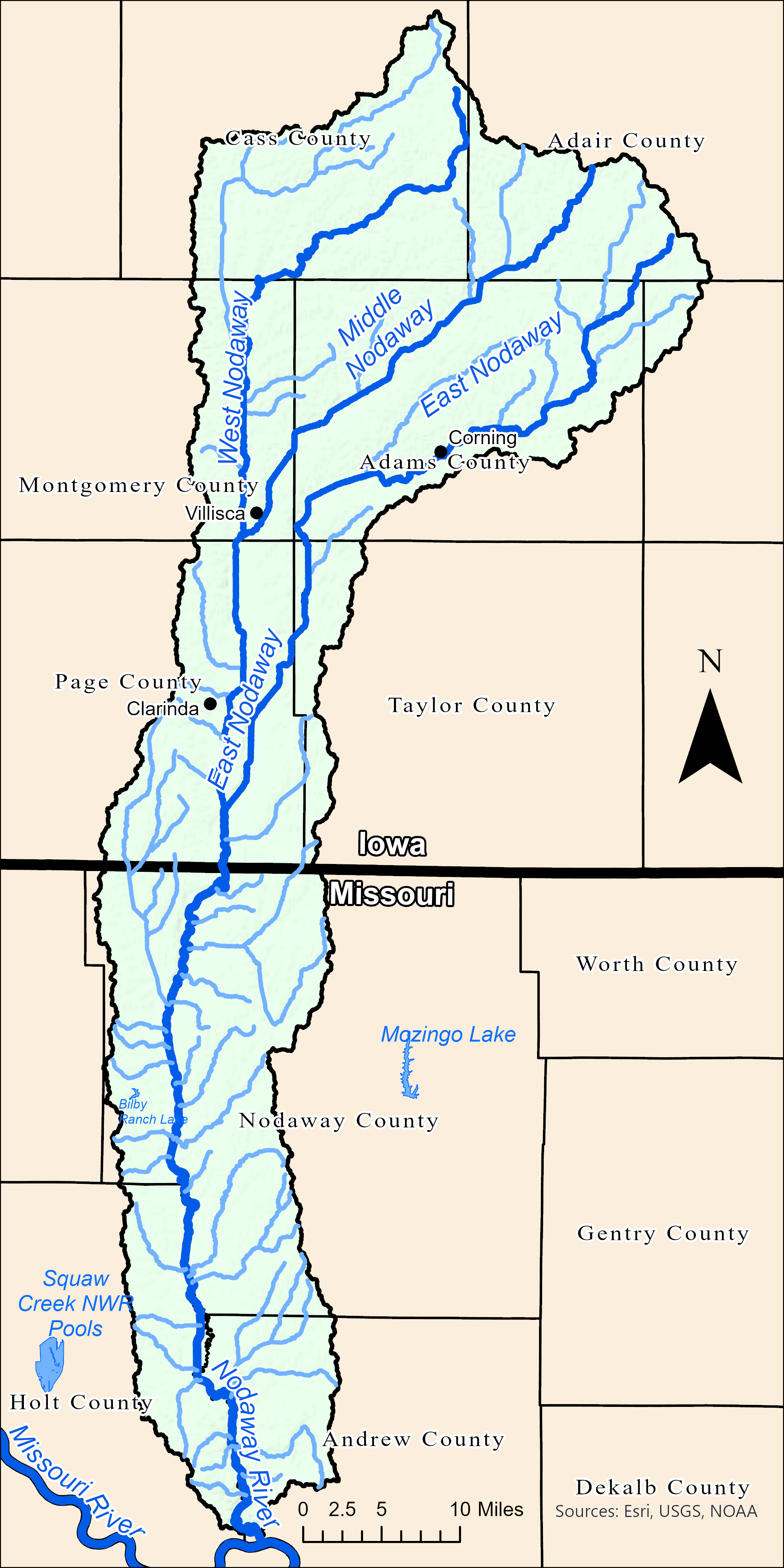
- Nodaway watershed in Iowa and Missouri
- Native name: Nyi At'ąwe (Iowa-Oto)

Location
- Country: United States
- States: Iowa, Missouri
- Counties: Page County, Iowa, Andrew County, Missouri, Holt County, Missouri, Nodaway County, Missouri

Physical characteristics
- Source: Confluence of the East and West Nodaway rivers
  - location: Clarinda, Iowa, US
  - coordinates: 40°38′06″N 95°01′08″W
  - elevation: 945 ft (288 m)
- Mouth: Missouri River
  - location: Amazonia, Missouri, US
  - coordinates: 39°54′07″N 94°57′58″W
  - elevation: 827 ft (252 m)
- Discharge
  - location: Graham, MO
  - average: 1,008 cu/ft. per sec.

Basin features
- Tributaries
  - left: West Nodaway River
  - right: East Nodaway River

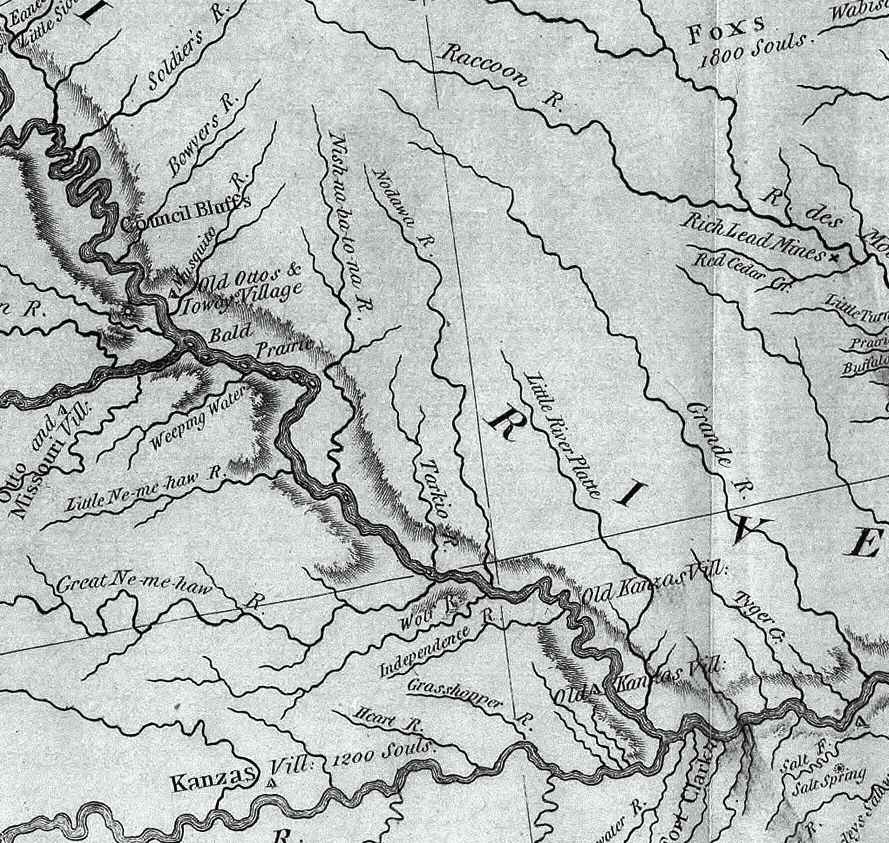
1814 map by Lewis and Clark of northwest Missouri showing Nodaway River as 'Nodawa'.

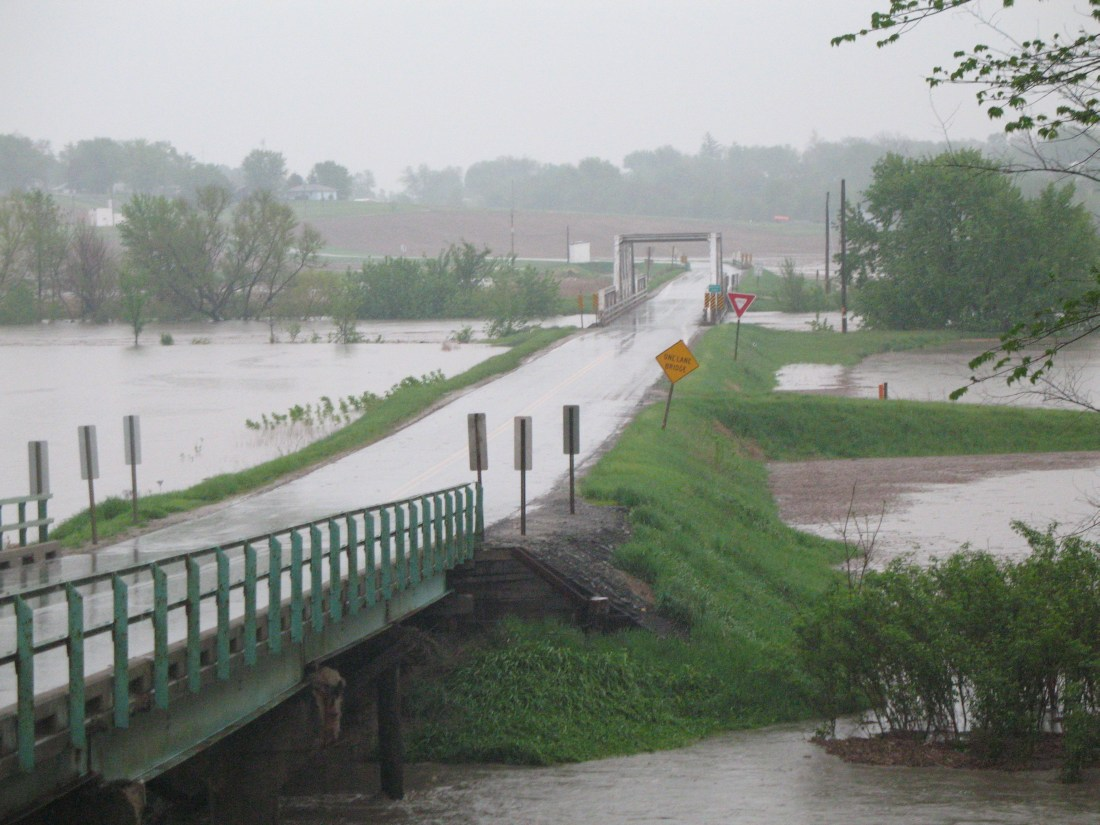
Nodaway River at Skidmore, Missouri during the May 2007 flood

The Nodaway River is a 65.7-mile-long (105.7 km) tributary that flows from southwest Iowa through northwest Missouri into the Missouri River. It is considered a major water source by the Iowa DNR.

== Etymology ==
The river's name (as "Nodawa") first appears in the journal of Lewis and Clark, who camped at the mouth of the river on July 8, 1804, but who provide no derivation of the name. The name is an Otoe-Missouria term meaning "jump over water". The term would be spelled today in full as Nyi At'ąwe (nyi (water) + a- (on) + t'ąwe (jump)) and would be contracted in regular speech as Nyat'ąwe or Nat'ąwe. The earliest recording of the modern spelling of Nodaway is shown in an 1834 map. Other variant spellings include, Naudoway, and Nadoway.

== History ==
Lewis and Clark camped at the river's mouth on Nodaway Island on July 8, 1804, by Nodaway, Missouri, on the border of Holt County, Missouri and Andrew County, Missouri and took note of the river.

Lewis and Clark liked the spot enough that they recommended it for the winter headquarters of Astor Expedition of 1810–12 that discovered the South Pass in Wyoming through which hundreds of settlers on the Oregon Trail, California Trail, Mormon Trail were to pass.

The river is navigable only by shallow fishing and row boats although steam ships navigated just inside its mouth. The river was the primary route for white settlers including Amos Graham and Isaac Hogan following the Platte Purchase of 1836 which opened northwest Missouri for settlement. Nodaway County, which derives its name from the river, was by far the biggest county in the purchase and the fifth largest in the state of Missouri.

== Description ==
The Nodaway begins near Shambaugh, Iowa at the confluence of the East and West Nodaway rivers. The West Nodaway River rises northeast of Massena in eastern Cass County, Iowa, and flows 73.8 miles (118.8 km) south-southwest past Villisca and Clarinda, the largest town on the river, to its junction with the East Nodaway. The East Nodaway River rises just west of Orient in Adair County and flows 72.8 miles (117.2 km) southwest past Prescott, Corning, Brooks, and Nodaway to its confluence with the West Nodaway. The Middle Nodaway River rises in Adair County south of Casey and flows 60.5 miles (97.4 km) southwest past Greenfield, Fontanelle, and Carbon to join the West Nodaway just below Villisca, Iowa, 20.2 miles (32.5 km) above the West Nodaway's juncture with the East Nodaway. The East and West Nodaway join to form the Nodaway River four miles (6.4 km) north of the Iowa-Missouri border, and the river travels south, passing Bradyville on its east, before entering Missouri.

Continuing from the Iowa border in Nodaway County, Missouri, the river travels south a mile west of Burlington Junction where it intersects US 136. Continuing southerly, the river passes west of Quitman and east of Bilby Ranch Lake Conservation Area before crossing Missouri Route 46. Afterward, the river passes by Skidmore and passes under Missouri Route 113 where it quickly becomes the border between Nodaway County and Holt County. Continuing southerly, it passes between Maitland to its east and Graham to its west, and reaches the tripoint with Andrew County. The river remains the boundary between Holt and Andrew counties to the Missouri River. The Nodaway River then passes through Nodaway Valley Conservation Area, where it is channelized and flows steadily until Interstate 29. Afterward, it passes west of Honey Creek Conservation Area and east of Monkey Mountain Conservation Area, and flows into the Missouri River Valley by Nodaway and joins the Missouri River.

Elevations in the Nodaway system range from just under 1,400 feet (430 m) above sea level at the source of the Middle Nodaway, to 950 feet (290 m) at the beginning of the main stem, to 800 feet (240 m) at its mouth on the Missouri River at the community of Nodaway in Andrew County, Missouri.

The Nodaway River is a sixth order river with a basin area of 1,820 square miles (4,700 km^{2}).

The Platte River basin is to the east and the Grand River and Des Moines River basins to the northeast, with the latter defining the boundary between the Missouri River and Mississippi River basins. The west side is bound by the Tarkio River basin and in the northwest by the Nishnabotna River basin.

The Nodaway River basin is prone to extensive flooding and can contribute as much as 20% of the flood crest of the Missouri River near its mouth.

At Graham, Missouri; its normal flow is 1,011 cubic feet per second (28.6 m^{3}/s). But during the Great Flood of 1993 the river was flowing 78,300 cu ft/s (2,220 m^{3}/s) at Graham.

== Tributaries ==
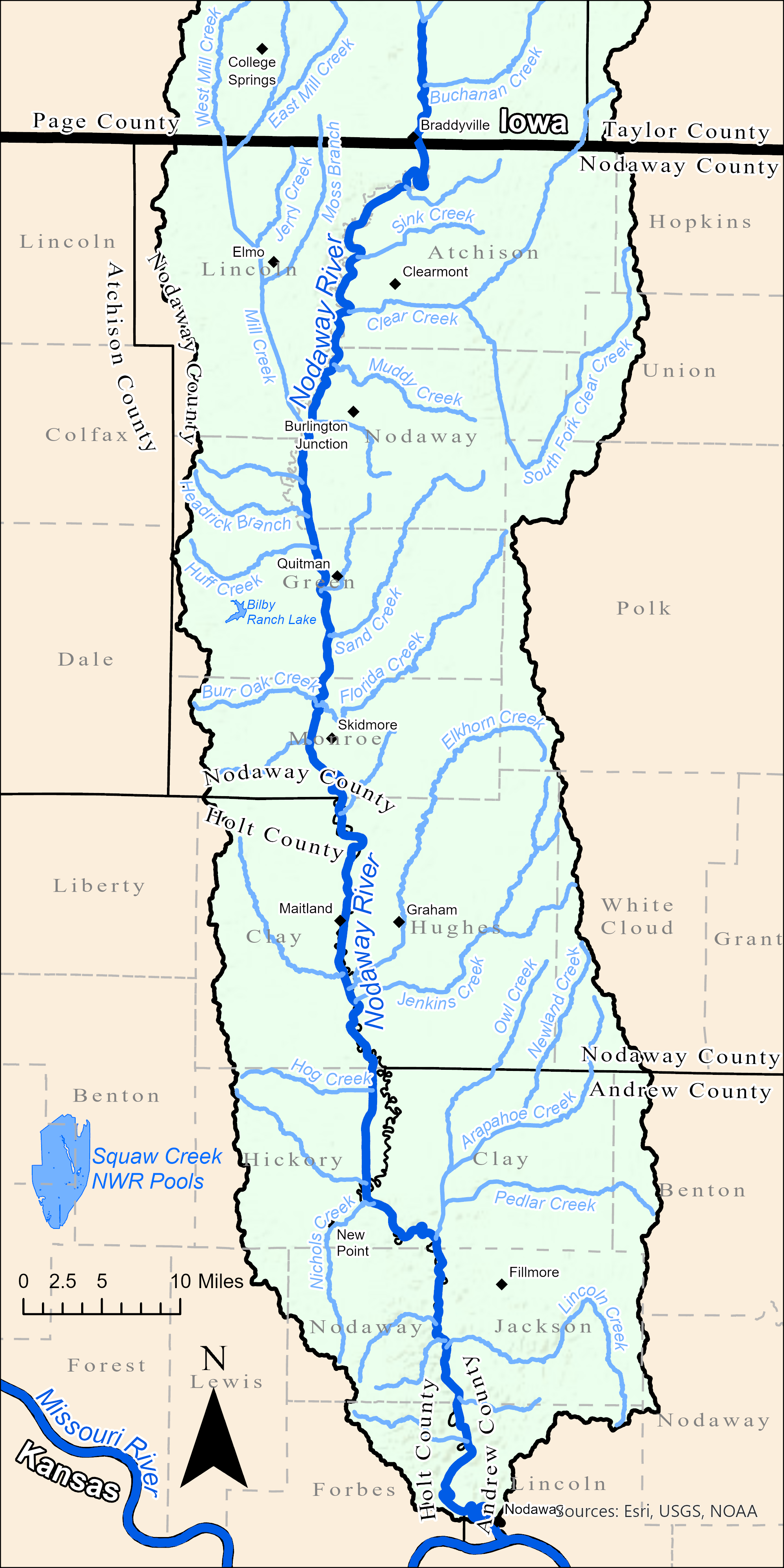
Map of the lower Nodaway River watershed in Missouri

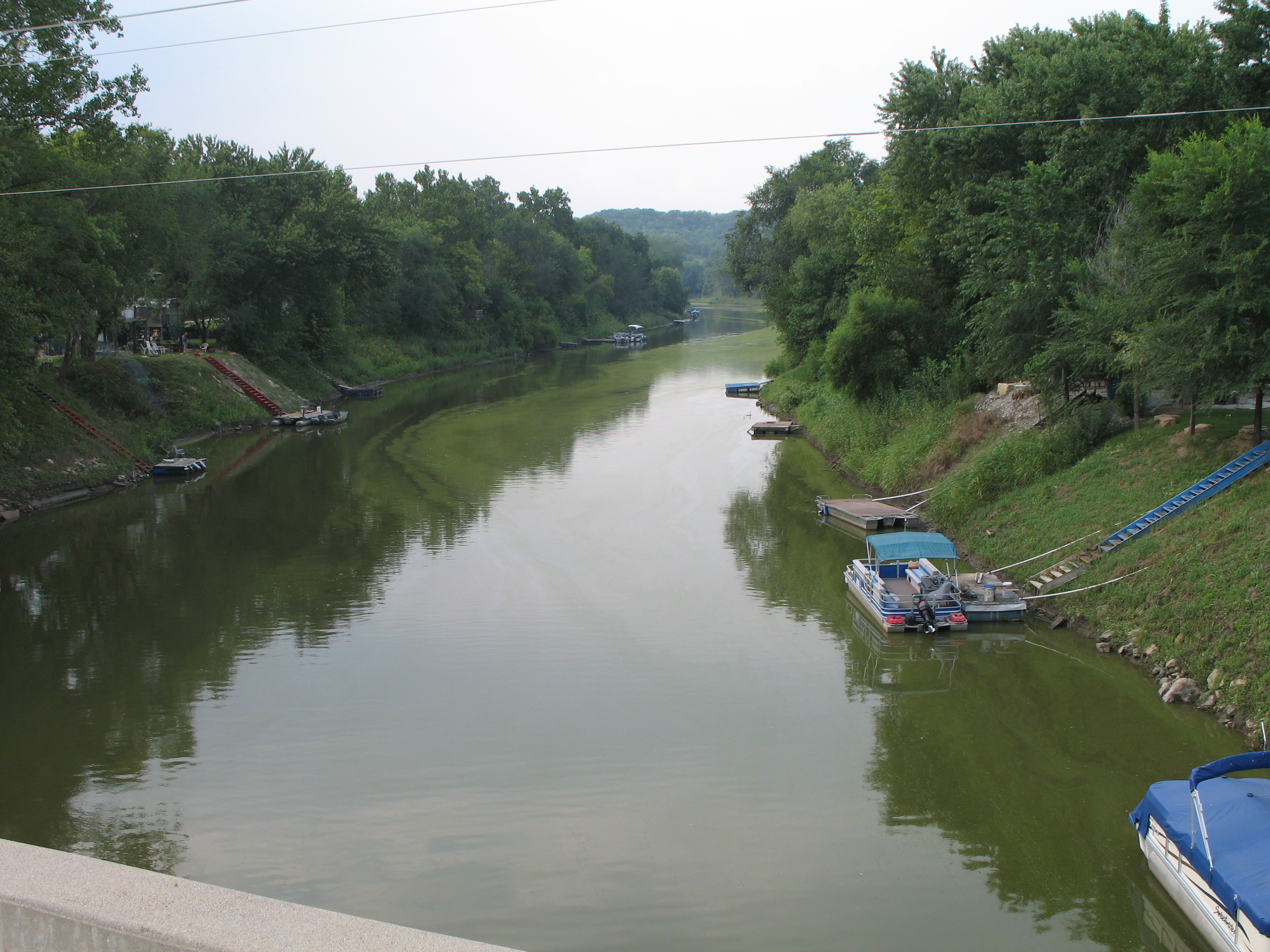
Nodaway River just before the confluence with the Missouri River at Nodaway, Missouri

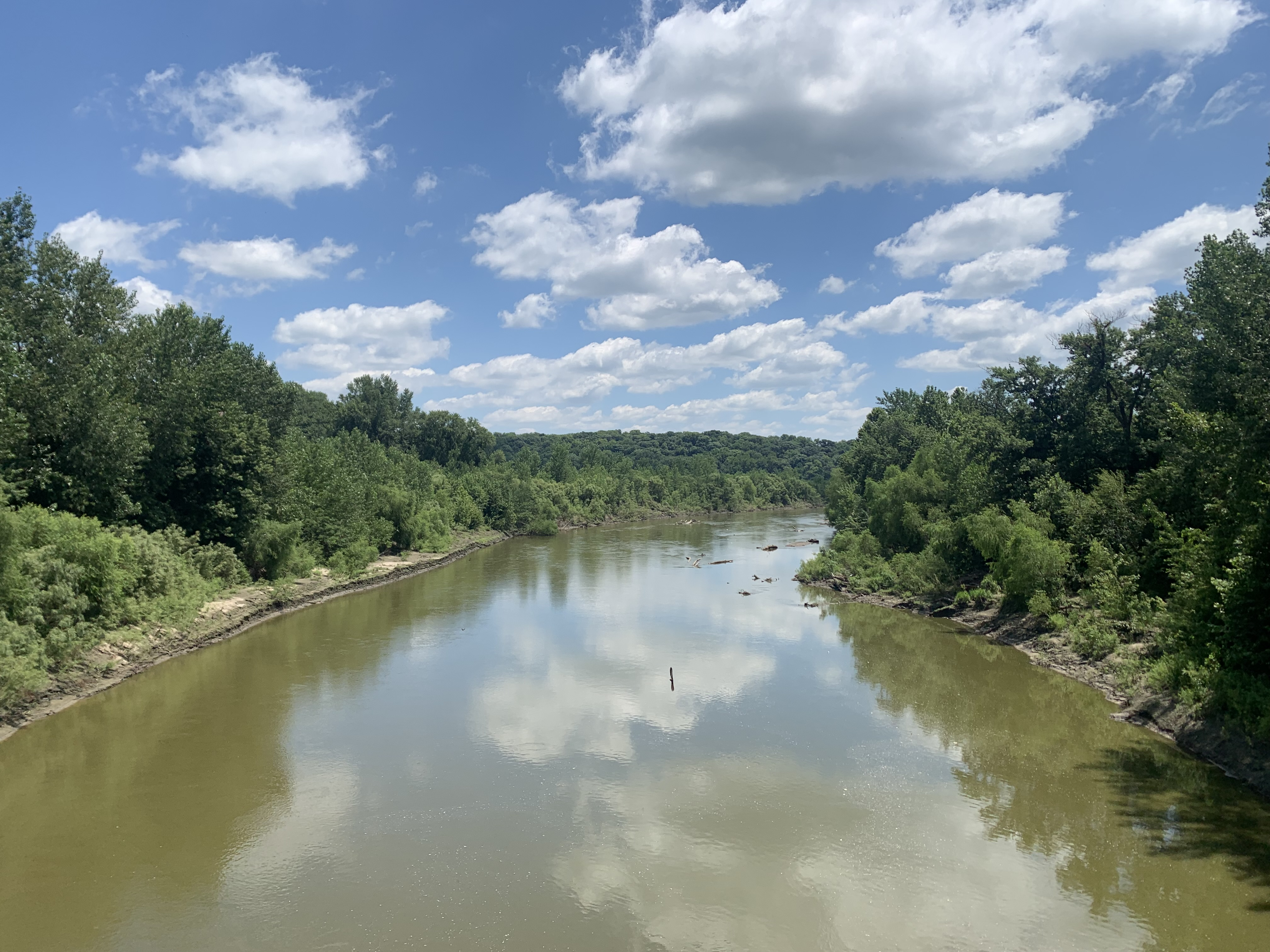
Andrew 48/Holt 255 bridge at the Nodaway River

The Nodaway River has 33 named direct tributaries, 3 of which are in Iowa and the other 30 in Missouri.

Left Tributary Name	Location of Confluence	Distance from Source	Distance from Mouth	Right Tributary Name
Page County, Iowa
East Nodaway River	SE of Shambaugh	0 mi (0 km)	65.7 mi (105.7 km)	West Nodaway River
Buchanan Creek	N of Braddyville	2.2 mi (3.5 km)	63.5 mi (102.2 km)	
Nodaway County, Missouri
Wolf Creek	S of Braddyville	7.3 mi (11.7 km)	58.4 mi (94.0 km)	
Sink Creek	NW of Clearmont	11 mi (18 km)	54.7 mi (88.0 km)	
Clear Creek	SW of Clearmont	13.4 mi (21.6 km)	52.3 mi (84.2 km)	
Muddy Creek	NW of Burlington Junction	15.6 mi (25.1 km)	50.1 mi (80.6 km)	
Cuyhoga Creek	W of Burlington Junction	18.9 mi (30.4 km)	46.8 mi (75.3 km)	
	W of Burlington Junction	19.1 mi (30.7 km)	46.6 mi (75.0 km)	Mill Creek
	SW of Burlington Junction	21 mi (34 km)	44.7 mi (71.9 km)	Hagey Branch
	NW of Quitman	22.1 mi (35.6 km)	43.6 mi (70.2 km)	Headrick Branch
	NW of Quitman	23.2 mi (37.3 km)	42.5 mi (68.4 km)	Huff Creek
Bowman Branch	S of Quitman	24.8 mi (39.9 km)	40.9 mi (65.8 km)	
Sand Creek	S of Quitman	26.4 mi (42.5 km)	39.3 mi (63.2 km)	
	N of Skidmore	28.8 mi (46.3 km)	36.9 mi (59.4 km)	Burr Oak Creek
Florida Creek	N of Skidmore	29.3 mi (47.2 km)	36.4 mi (58.6 km)	
	W of Skidmore	29.6 mi (47.6 km)	36.1 mi (58.1 km)	Hickory Creek
Holt and Nodaway counties, Missouri
Bagby Creek	S of Skidmore	33 mi (53 km)	32.7 mi (52.6 km)	
	S of Skidmore	33.3 mi (53.6 km)	32.4 mi (52.1 km)	Rolling Branch
	S of Maitland	39.4 mi (63.4 km)	26.3 mi (42.3 km)	Highly Creek
Elkhorn Creek	S of Maitland	39.9 mi (64.2 km)	25.8 mi (41.5 km)	
Jenkins Creek	S of Maitland	40.4 mi (65.0 km)	25.3 mi (40.7 km)	
Hayzlett Branch	S of Graham	42.9 mi (69.0 km)	22.8 mi (36.7 km)	
Holt and Andrew counties, Missouri
	NE of New Point	44 mi (71 km)	21.7 mi (34.9 km)	Hog Creek
	NE of New Point	47.2 mi (76.0 km)	18.5 mi (29.8 km)	Hickory Creek
	NE of New Point	48 mi (77 km)	17.7 mi (28.5 km)	Nichols Creek
Arapahoe Creek	NW of Fillmore	51.3 mi (82.6 km)	14.4 mi (23.2 km)	
	SW of Fillmore	54.4 mi (87.5 km)	11.3 mi (18.2 km)	Carroll Branch
	SW of Fillmore	55.2 mi (88.8 km)	10.5 mi (16.9 km)	Meade Creek
Lincoln Creek	SW of Fillmore	55.5 mi (89.3 km)	10.2 mi (16.4 km)	
Honey Creek	NW of Nodaway	57.4 mi (92.4 km)	8.3 mi (13.4 km)	
	NW of Nodaway	59 mi (95 km)	6.7 mi (10.8 km)	Smith Creek

== See also ==
- List of tributaries of the Missouri River
- List of rivers of Iowa
- List of rivers of Missouri
