= Burlington Junction, Missouri =

City in Missouri, U.S.

- City
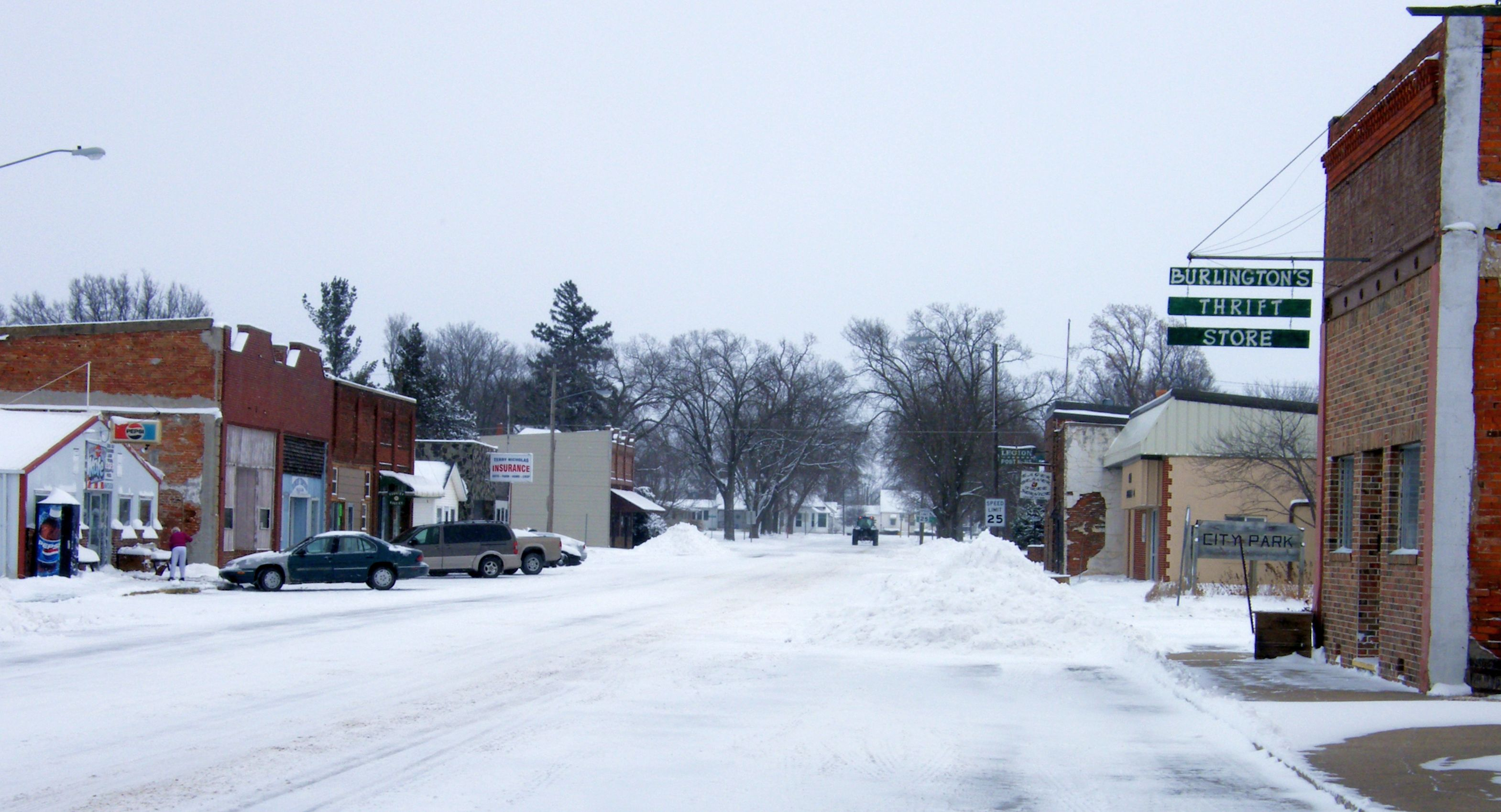
- US 136 in Burlington Junction, March 2009

- Location of Burlington Junction, Missouri
- Coordinates: 40°26′48″N 95°04′00″W
- Country: United States
- State: Missouri
- County: Nodaway
- Township: Nodaway
- Incorporated: 1879

Area
  - Total: 1.00 sq mi (2.59 km^{2})
  - Land: 1.00 sq mi (2.59 km^{2})
  - Water: 0 sq mi (0.00 km^{2})
- Elevation: 971 ft (296 m)

Population (2020)
  - Total: 521
  - Density: 521.2/sq mi (201.25/km^{2})
- Time zone: UTC-6 (Central (CST))
  - Summer (DST): UTC-5 (CDT)
- ZIP code: 64428
- Area code: 660
- FIPS code: 29-09838
- GNIS feature ID: 2393470
- Website: burlingtonjunction.org

Burlington Junction is a city in northwestern Nodaway County, Missouri, United States. The population was 521 at the 2020 census and is the second largest city in the county by population.

== History ==
Burlington Junction was founded in 1879, and named for the junction between the Chicago, Burlington and Quincy Railroad and the Wabash Railroad near the original town site. A post office called Burlington Junction has been in operation since 1879, though for its first year it was called Cleveland.

Possum Walk Hotel was listed on the National Register of Historic Places in 1983.

== Geography ==
According to the United States Census Bureau, the city has a total area of 1.11 square miles (2.87 km^{2}), all land. Burlington Junction lies 4.5 miles southwest of Clearmont, 12 miles northwest of Maryville, and around 17 miles east of Tarkio. Also, US Highway 136 intersects the northern terminus of Missouri Route 113 in the city.

== Demographics ==
Historical population
Census	Pop.	Note	%±
1880	657		—
1890	707		7.6%
1900	759		7.4%
1910	942		24.1%
1920	970		3.0%
1930	813		−16.2%
1940	838		3.1%
1950	746		−11.0%
1960	650		−12.9%
1970	634		−2.5%
1980	657		3.6%
1990	634		−3.5%
2000	632		−0.3%
2010	537		−15.0%
2020	521		−3.0%
U.S. Decennial Census

=== 2010 census ===
As of the census of 2010, there were 537 people, 228 households, and 147 families living in the city. The population density was 483.8 inhabitants per square mile (186.8/km^{2}). There were 266 housing units at an average density of 239.6 per square mile (92.5/km^{2}). The racial makeup of the city was 99.1% White, 0.2% from other races, and 0.7% from two or more races. Hispanic or Latino of any race were 0.9% of the population.

There were 228 households, of which 32.9% had children under the age of 18 living with them, 49.1% were married couples living together, 9.2% had a female householder with no husband present, 6.1% had a male householder with no wife present, and 35.5% were non-families. 31.1% of all households were made up of individuals, and 13.6% had someone living alone who was 65 years of age or older. The average household size was 2.36 and the average family size was 2.96.

The median age in the city was 37.5 years. 26.3% of residents were under the age of 18; 8% were between the ages of 18 and 24; 24.2% were from 25 to 44; 25.5% were from 45 to 64; and 16% were 65 years of age or older. The gender makeup of the city was 50.7% male and 49.3% female.

=== 2000 census ===
As of the census of 2000, there were 632 people, 254 households, and 170 families living in the city. The population density was 563.8 people per square mile (217.7 people/km^{2}). There were 288 housing units at an average density of 256.9 per square mile (99.2/km^{2}). The racial makeup of the city was 99.68% White and 0.32% Native American. Hispanic or Latino of any race were 0.16% of the population.

There were 254 households, out of which 35.8% had children under the age of 18 living with them, 55.9% were married couples living together, 6.7% had a female householder with no husband present, and 32.7% were non-families. 29.1% of all households were made up of individuals, and 16.5% had someone living alone who was 65 years of age or older. The average household size was 2.46 and the average family size was 3.06.

In the city the population was spread out, with 27.7% under the age of 18, 10.8% from 18 to 24, 25.9% from 25 to 44, 18.8% from 45 to 64, and 16.8% who were 65 years of age or older. The median age was 34 years. For every 100 females there were 92.7 males. For every 100 females age 18 and over, there were 83.5 males.

The median income for a household in the city was $29,722, and the median income for a family was $34,808. Males had a median income of $28,068 versus $18,214 for females. The per capita income for the city was $13,065. About 6.7% of families and 12.0% of the population were below the poverty line, including 10.7% of those under age 18 and 13.2% of those age 65 or over.

== Education ==
West Nodaway R-I School District is the local school district. The secondary school is West Nodaway High School.

== Notable people ==
- William M. Grace, building developer
- Bob Hendren, American football player for the Washington Redskins
- Bill Tobin, former professional football player
- Vince Tobin, football coach and former college football player

== See also ==
- List of cities in Missouri
