= East Mill Creek =

Stream in Iowa and Missouri, U.S.

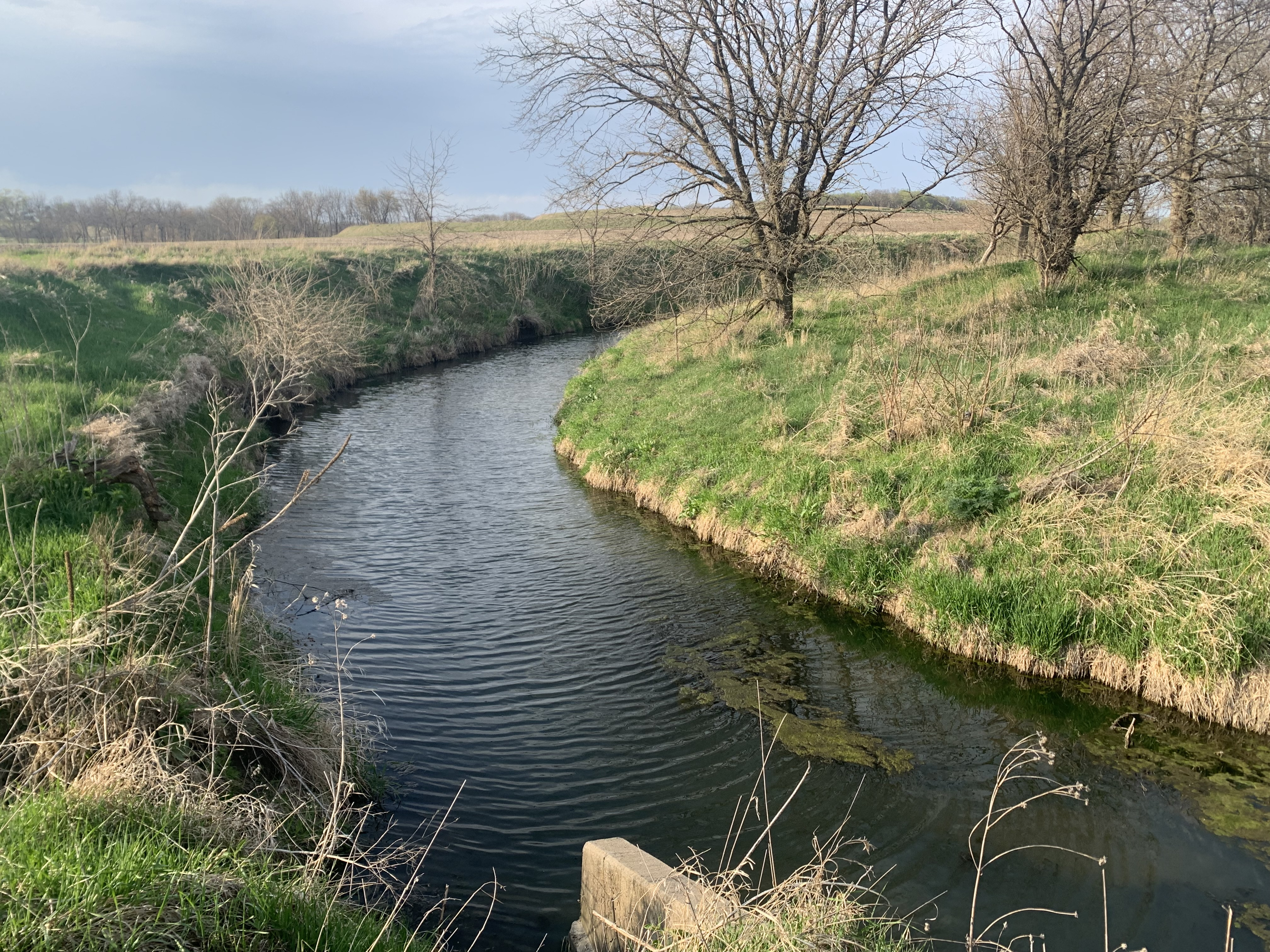
- East Mill Creek on Iowa Highway J64 bridge south of College Springs, Iowa

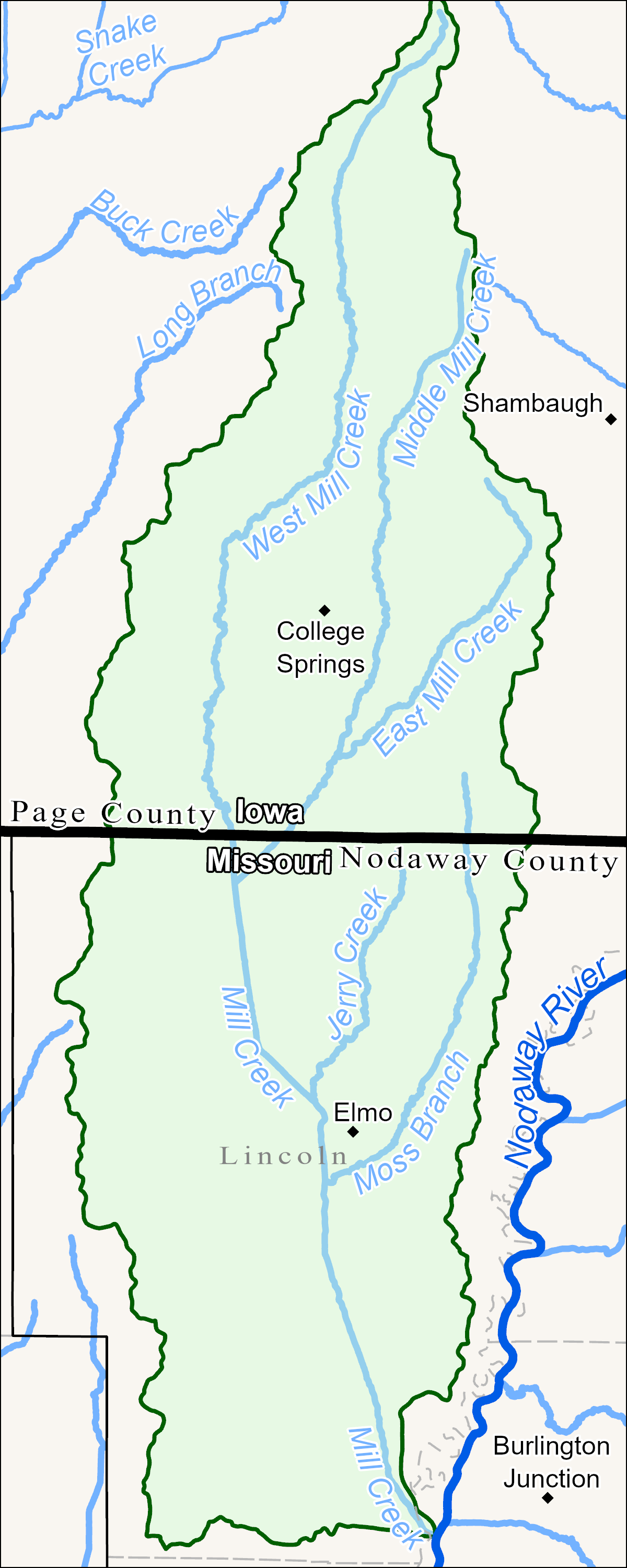
- Mill Creek Watershed map, East Mill Creek in top right

Location
- Country: United States
- State: Iowa and Missouri
- County: Page and Nodaway

Physical characteristics
- Source
  - location: Amity Township
  - coordinates: 40°38′30″N 95°04′31″W
  - elevation: 1,155 ft (352 m)
- Mouth: Mill Creek
  - location: Lincoln Township
  - coordinates: 40°34′07″N 95°08′35″W
  - elevation: 971 ft (296 m)
- Length: 8.4 mi (13.5 km)

Basin features
- Progression: East Mill Creek → Mill Creek → Nodaway River → Missouri River → Mississippi River → Atlantic Ocean

East Mill Creek is a stream in Page County, Iowa and Nodaway County, Missouri in the United States. It is an indirect tributary of the Nodaway River via Mill Creek and is 8.4 miles long.

== Etymology ==
East Mill Creek has also been denoted as Mill Creek. Some maps denote the section of stream between the confluence of the East and Middle Mill Creeks as Middle Mill Creek though according to GNIS and the MDC that section is properly denoted as East Mill Creek.

== Geography ==
The confluence of East Mill Creek and West Mill Creek form Mill Creek with East Mill Creek as a left tributary. The confluence is 12.3 miles before Mill Creek's mouth in the Nodaway River.

=== Course ===
Beginning near the midpoint between College Springs and Shambaugh, East Mill Creek flows southerly and then southwesterly passed College Springs to the south. It is joined by Middle Mill Creek one mile north of the Iowa-Missouri border and continues southwest where it meets West Mill Creek and forms Mill Creek three-fifths of a mile south of the aforementioned state border in northwestern Nodaway County, Missouri.

=== Tributaries ===
Middle Mill Creek is the only named tributary of East Mill Creek and its confluence is in southern Amity Township.

=== Crossings ===
East Mill Creek is crossed by two Secondary Highways, J52 and J64, northeast and southeast of College Springs, respectively.

== See also ==
- Tributaries of the Nodaway River
- List of rivers of Iowa
- List of rivers of Missouri
