= Middle Mill Creek =

Stream in southwest Iowa, U.S.

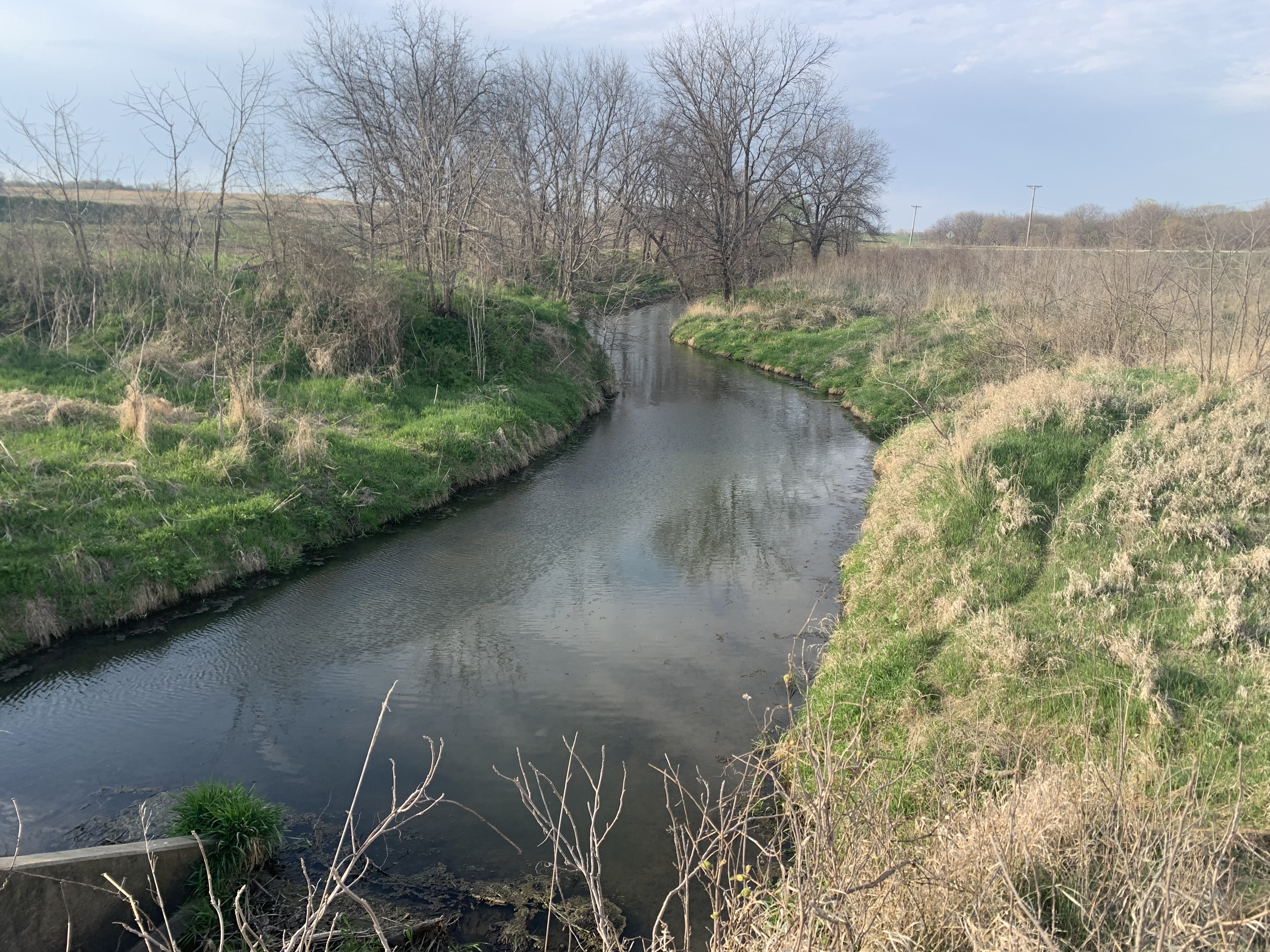
- Middle Mill Creek on Iowa Highway J64 bridge south of College Springs

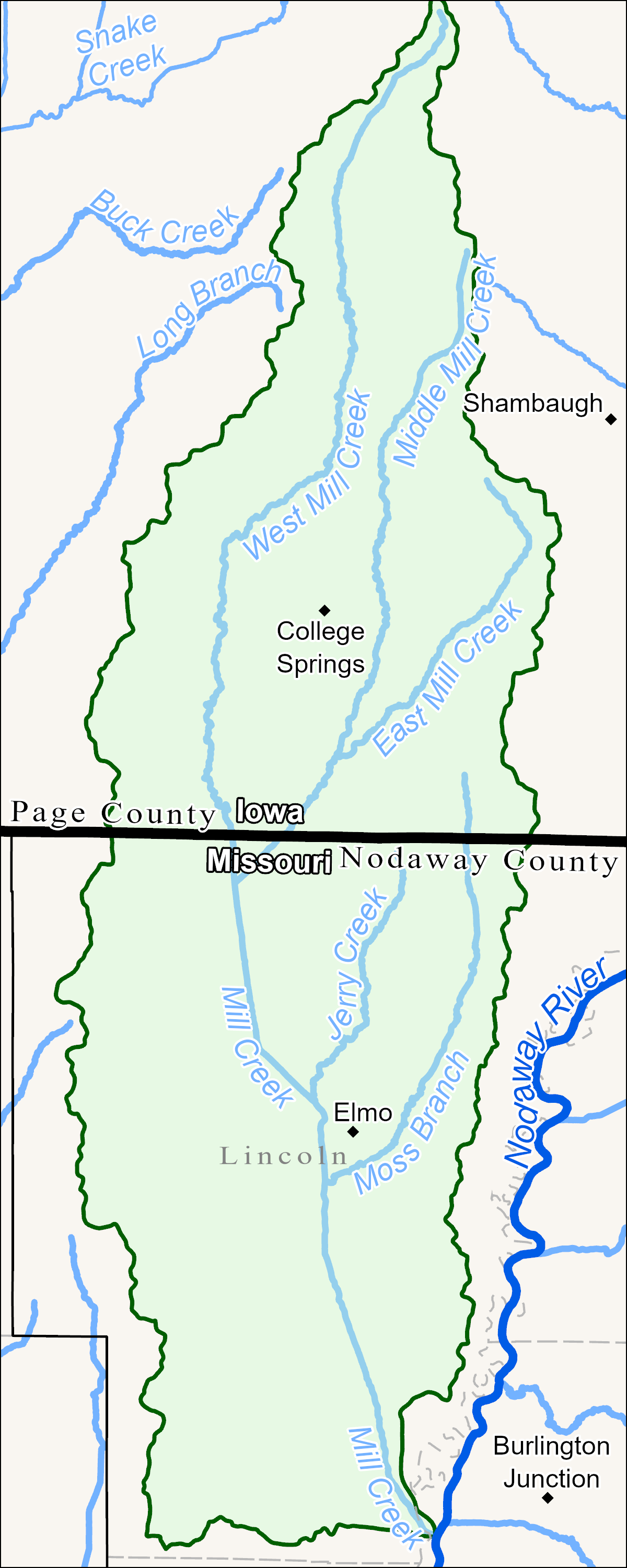
- Mill Creek Watershed map, Middle Mill Creek in top center

Location
- Country: United States
- State: Iowa
- County: Page

Physical characteristics
- Source
  - location: Harlan Township
  - coordinates: 40°40′29″N 95°05′13″W
  - elevation: 1,175 ft (358 m)
- Mouth: East Mill Creek
  - location: Amity Township
  - coordinates: 40°36′24″N 95°06′37″W
  - elevation: 1,014 ft (309 m)
- Length: 8.6 mi (13.8 km)

Basin features
- Progression: Middle Mill Creek → East Mill Creek → Mill Creek → Nodaway River → Missouri River → Mississippi River → Atlantic Ocean

Middle Mill Creek is a stream in Page County of southwest Iowa, United States. It is an indirect tributary of the Nodaway River via the East fork of Mill Creek and is 8.6 miles long.

== Etymology ==
Some maps denote the section of stream between the confluence of the East and Middle Mill Creeks as Middle Mill Creek though according to GNIS and the MDC that section is properly denoted as East Mill Creek.

== Geography ==
Middle Mill Creek is a right tributary of East Mill Creek and joins it 2.6 miles before its mouth in the Mill Creek.

=== Course ===
Beginning northwest of Shambaugh, Middle Mill Creek flows southerly towards College Springs where it passes it just to the east. It is joined by East Mill Creek one mile north of the Iowa-Missouri border directly south of College Springs.

=== Crossings ===
Middle Mill Creek is crossed by two Secondary Highways, J52 and J64, northeast and southeast of College Springs, respectively.

== See also ==
- Tributaries of the Nodaway River
- List of rivers of Iowa
