= West Mill Creek =

Stream in Iowa and Missouri, U.S.

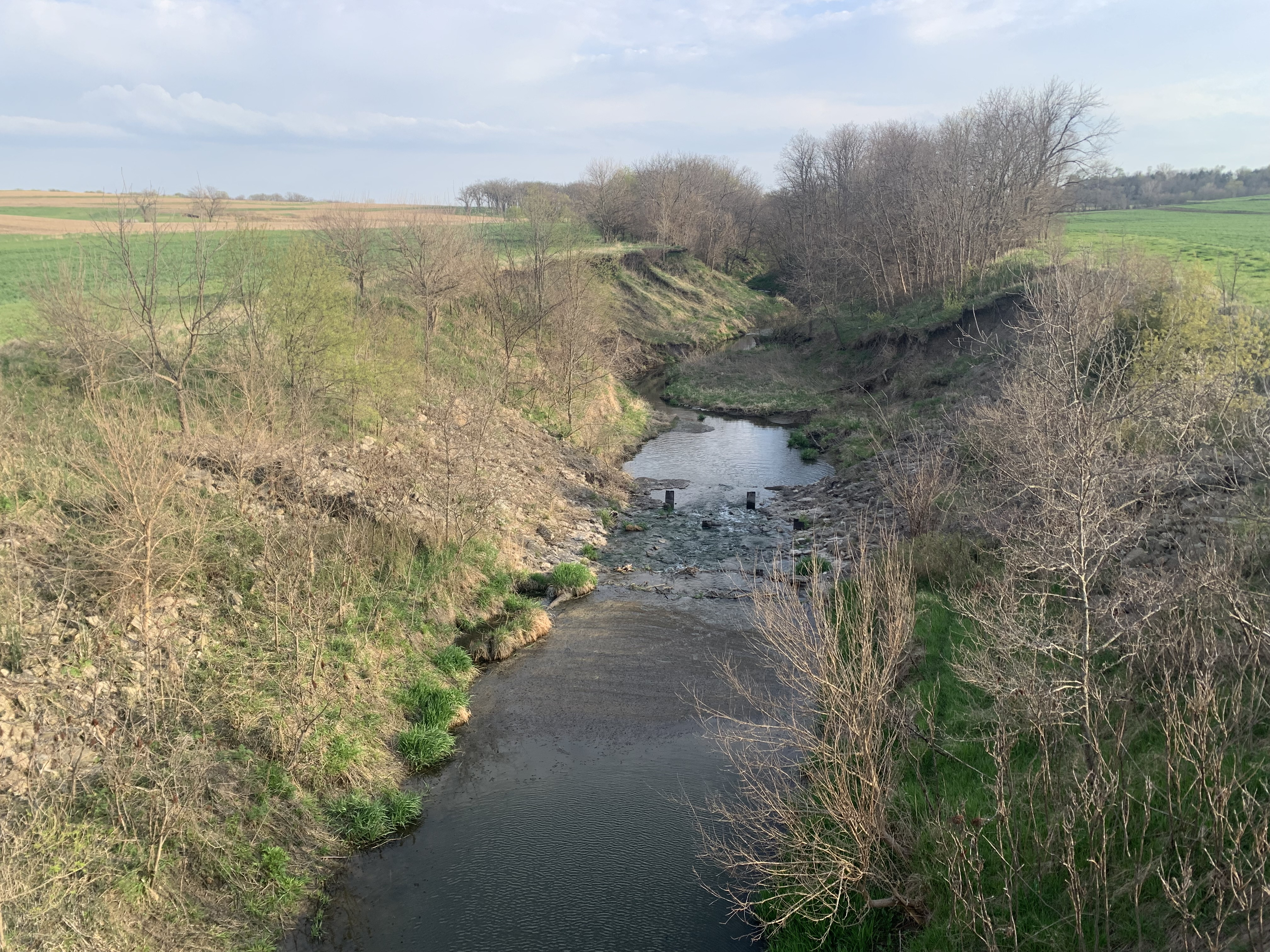
- West Mill Creek on Iowa Highway J64 bridge south of College Springs, Iowa

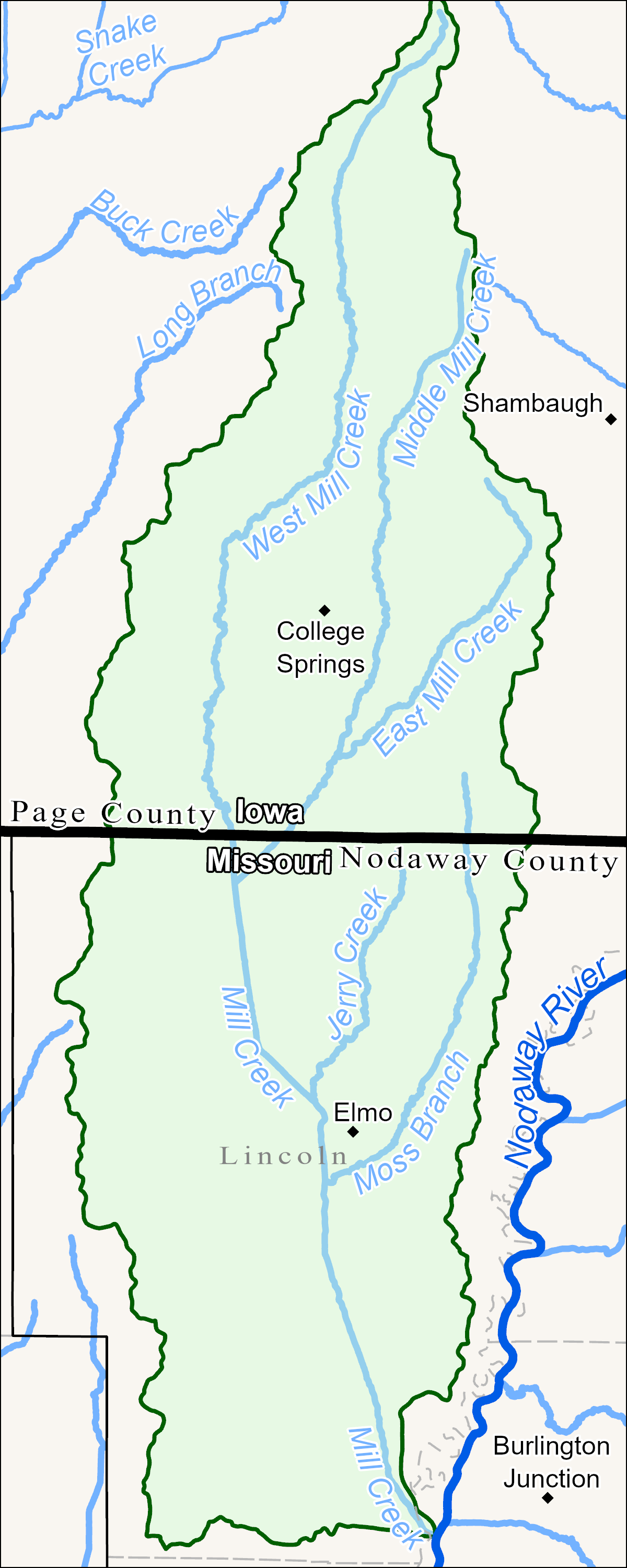
- Mill Creek Watershed map, Middle Mill Creek in top left

Location
- Country: United States
- State: Iowa and Missouri
- County: Page and Nodaway

Physical characteristics
- Source
  - location: Nodaway Township
  - coordinates: 40°44′00″N 95°05′31″W
  - elevation: 1,190 ft (360 m)
- Mouth: Mill Creek
  - location: Lincoln Township
  - coordinates: 40°34′07″N 95°08′40″W
  - elevation: 971 ft (296 m)
- Length: 15.9 mi (25.6 km)

Basin features
- Progression: West Mill Creek → Mill Creek → Nodaway River → Missouri River → Mississippi River → Atlantic Ocean

West Mill Creek is a stream in Page County, Iowa and Nodaway County, Missouri in the United States. IIt is an indirect tributary of the Nodaway River via Mill Creek and is 15.9 miles long.

== Etymology ==
West Mill Creek has also been denoted as Mill Creek.

== Geography ==
The confluence of West Mill Creek and East Mill Creek form Mill Creek with West Mill Creek as a right tributary. The conflunce is 12.3 miles before Mill Creek's mouth in the Nodaway River.

=== Course ===
West Mill Creek begins just south of Iowa 2 three miles west of Clarinda and flows southwesterly in the westernmost stretches of the Nodaway River watershed, near the Tarkio River watershed. It passes a mile west of College Springs and continues southerly towards the Iowa-Missouri border where it crosses four miles east of Blanchard. It continues three-fifths of a mile south of the aforementioned state border where it meets with the East Mill Creek to form Mill Creek in northwestern Nodaway County, Missouri.

=== Crossings ===
West Mill Creek is crossed by five Secondary Highways: J40, J52, J56, J64, and M63.

== See also ==
- Tributaries of the Nodaway River
- List of rivers of Iowa
- List of rivers of Missouri
