= Clear Creek (Nodaway River tributary) =

Stream in Iowa and Missouri, U.S.

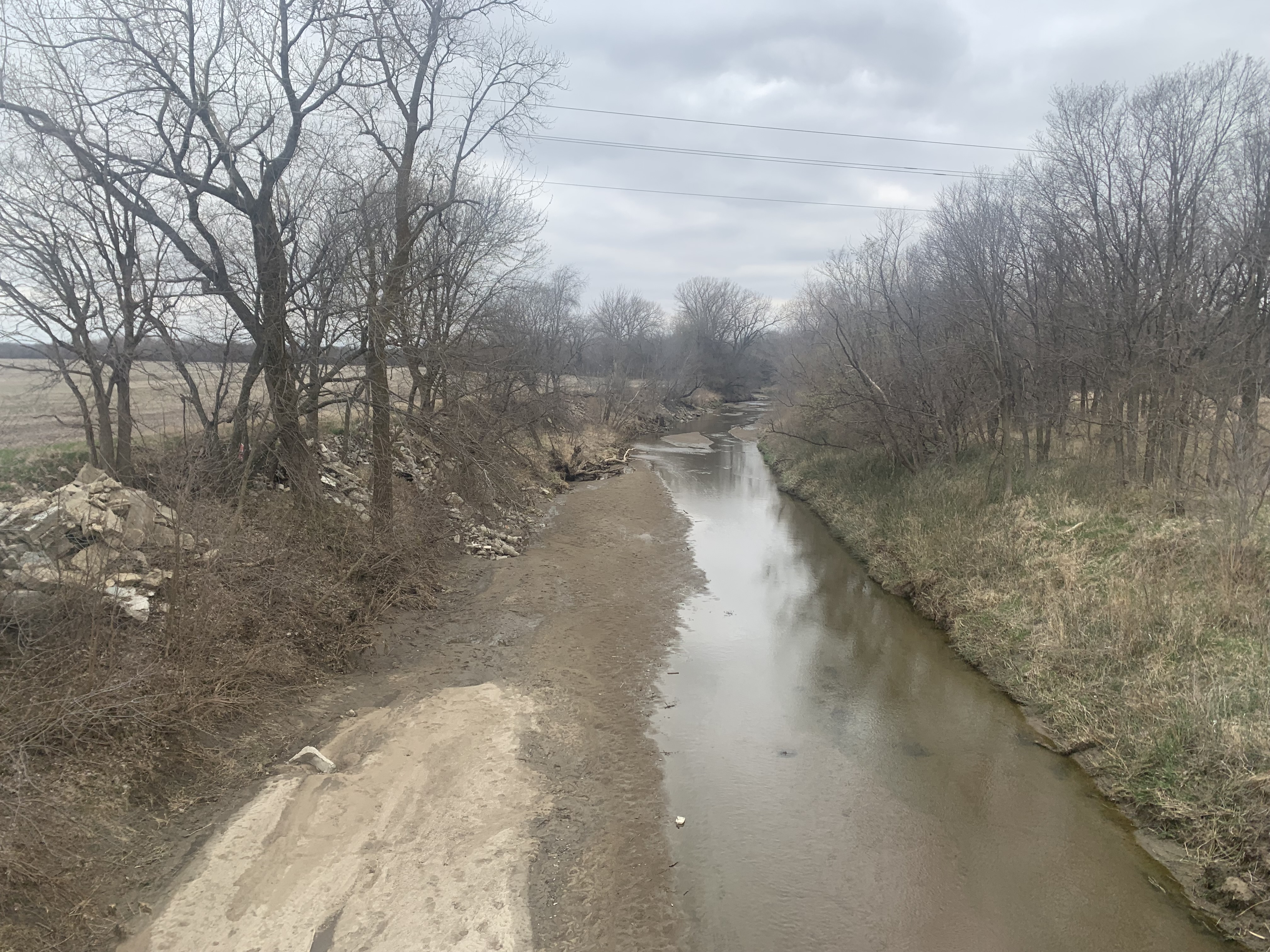
- Clear Creek at US Highway 71 bridge just south of Clearmont, Missouri

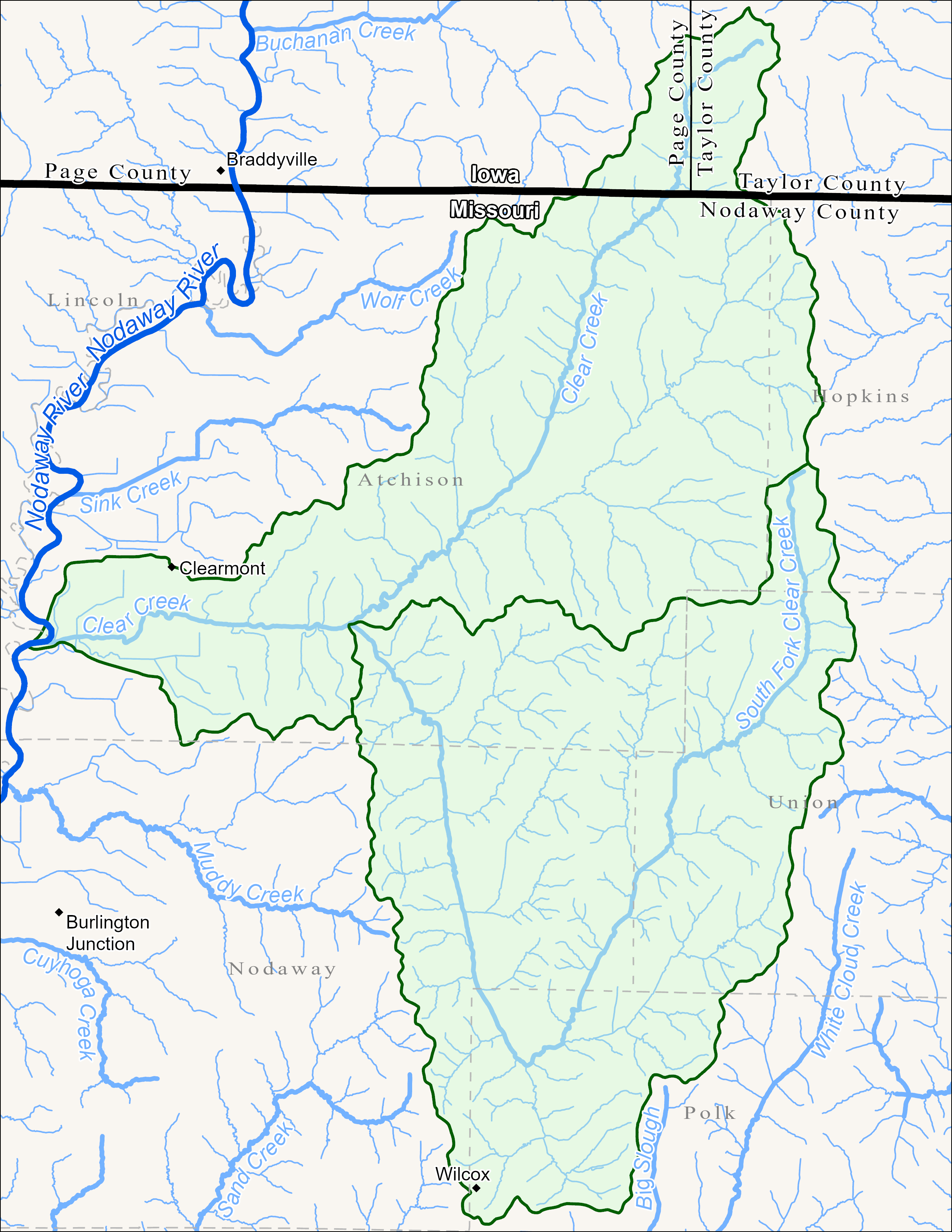
- Watershed map of Clear Creek

Location
- Country: United States
- State: Iowa and Missouri
- County: Page County, Iowa, Taylor County, Iowa, and Nodaway County, Missouri

Physical characteristics
- Source
  - location: Polk Township
  - coordinates: 40°36′08″N 94°53′56″W
  - elevation: 1,175 ft (358 m)
- Mouth: Nodaway River
  - location: Atchison Township
  - coordinates: 40°29′41″N 95°04′13″W
  - elevation: 912 ft (278 m)
- Length: 15.6 mi (25.1 km)
- Basin size: 68.16 sq mi (176.5 km^{2})

Basin features
- Progression: Clear Creek → Nodaway River → Missouri River → Mississippi River → Atlantic Ocean
- Stream gradient 16.7 ft/mi (3.16 m/km)

Clear Creek is a stream in northwestern Missouri and southwestern Iowa, in the United States. It is a tributary to the Nodaway River and is 15.6 miles long.

== Etymology ==
The stream was named due to its clear waters., though there is a map that shows it as Clair Creek, which gives credence to the idea that the name for city Clearmont did not come from the creek being clear.

== Geography ==
Clear Creek is a left tributary of the Nodaway River and joins it 52.3 miles before its mouth in the Missouri River. The watershed of Clear Creek and that of its one main tributary, South Fork Clear Creek, are almost exactly the same area, 88.38 km^{2} (34.12 sq mi) and 88.16 km^{2} (34.04 sq mi) respectively. Additionally, South Fork Clear Creek is longer than Clear Creek, being 16.8 miles. Clear Creek, before its confluence with South Fork Clear Creek, has also been denoted as North Fork Clear Creek. Also, the south fork has been denoted as Clear Creek.

=== Course ===
The headwaters arise in southwestern Taylor County in southern Iowa. The stream flows through the southeast corner of Page County and enters Nodaway County.

The stream flows to the southwest for approximately six miles and then turns to the west, southeast of the community of Clearmont. Clear Creek crosses under US 71 one half mile south of Clearmont and enters the Nodaway River just to the east of the extinct hamlet of Possum Walk.

=== Hydrology ===
Clearmont has its permitted wastewater treatment facility flow into Clear Creek.

=== Crossings ===
Four highways cross Clear Creek: US 71 crosses just south of Clearmont right before its confluence with the Nodaway River. Route B and JJ cross in Atchison Township. CR J55 crosses the creek twice near its mouth, once in Page County, Iowa, and once in Taylor County, Iowa.

== Miscellaneous ==
There is a wind farm located partially in the Clear Creek watershed called Clear Creek Energy Center.

== See also ==
- Tributaries of the Nodaway River
- List of rivers of Iowa
- List of rivers of Missouri
