= Sink Creek =

Stream in northwest Missouri, U.S.

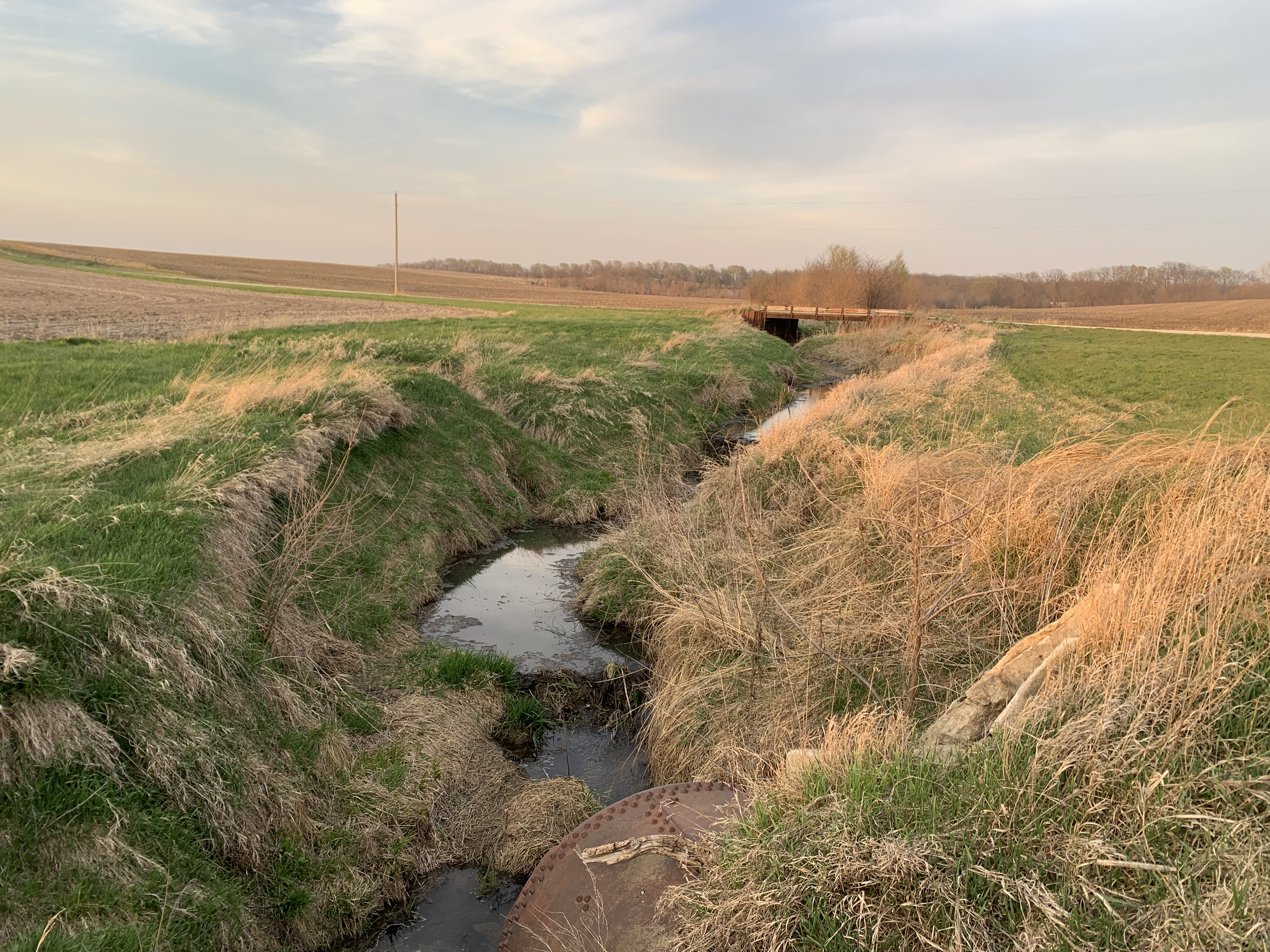
- Sink Creek at 130th Street and Fairway Road northeast of Clearmont

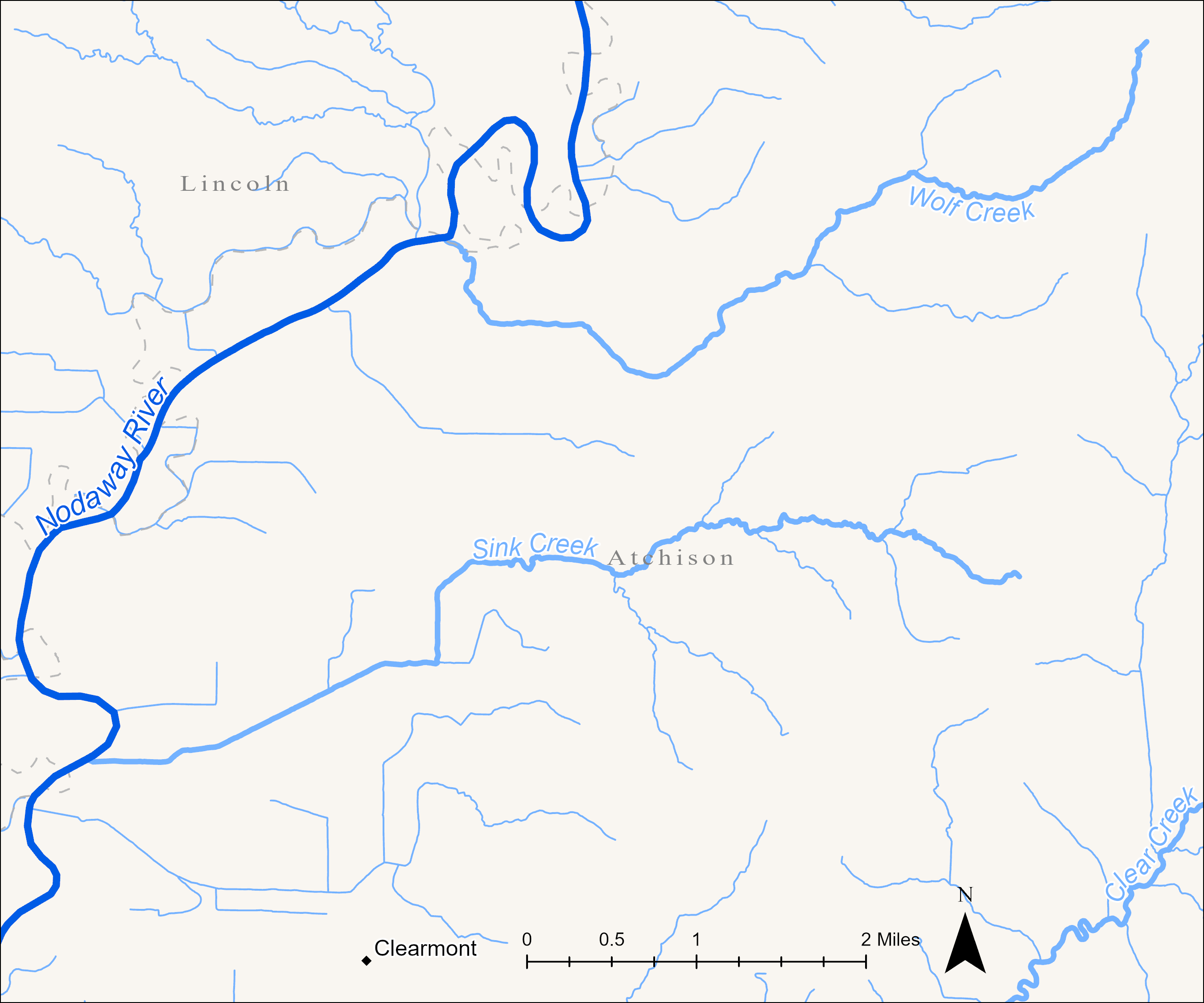

Location
- Country: United States
- State: Missouri
- County: Nodaway County, Missouri

Physical characteristics
- Source
  - location: Atchison Township
  - coordinates: 40°32′04″N 94°58′43″W
  - elevation: 1,110 ft (340 m)
- Mouth: Nodaway River
  - location: Atchison Township
  - coordinates: 40°31′18″N 95°03′27″W
  - elevation: 922 ft (281 m)
- Length: 5.7 mi (9.2 km)

Basin features
- Progression: Sink Creek → Nodaway River → Missouri River → Mississippi River → Atlantic Ocean

Sink Creek is a stream in northwestern Missouri in the United States. It is a tributary to the Nodaway River and is 5.7 miles long.

== Etymology ==
A variant name was "Sinking Creek". The creek was so named because it is a losing stream along part of its course.

== Geography ==
Sink Creek is a left tributary of the Nodaway River and joins it 54.7 miles before its mouth in the Missouri River. The stream begins about 3 miles northeast of Clearmont, travels southwesterly to a point about 2 miles northwest of Clearmont where is joins the Nodaway River. Sink Creek is crossed by US 71 two miles north of Clearmont not long before its confluence with the Nodaway River.

== See also ==
- Tributaries of the Nodaway River
- List of rivers of Missouri
