= Clearmont =

Clearmont can refer to:

- Clearmont, Missouri
- Clearmont, Wyoming
