= Mill Creek (Nodaway River tributary) =

Stream in Missouri, U.S.

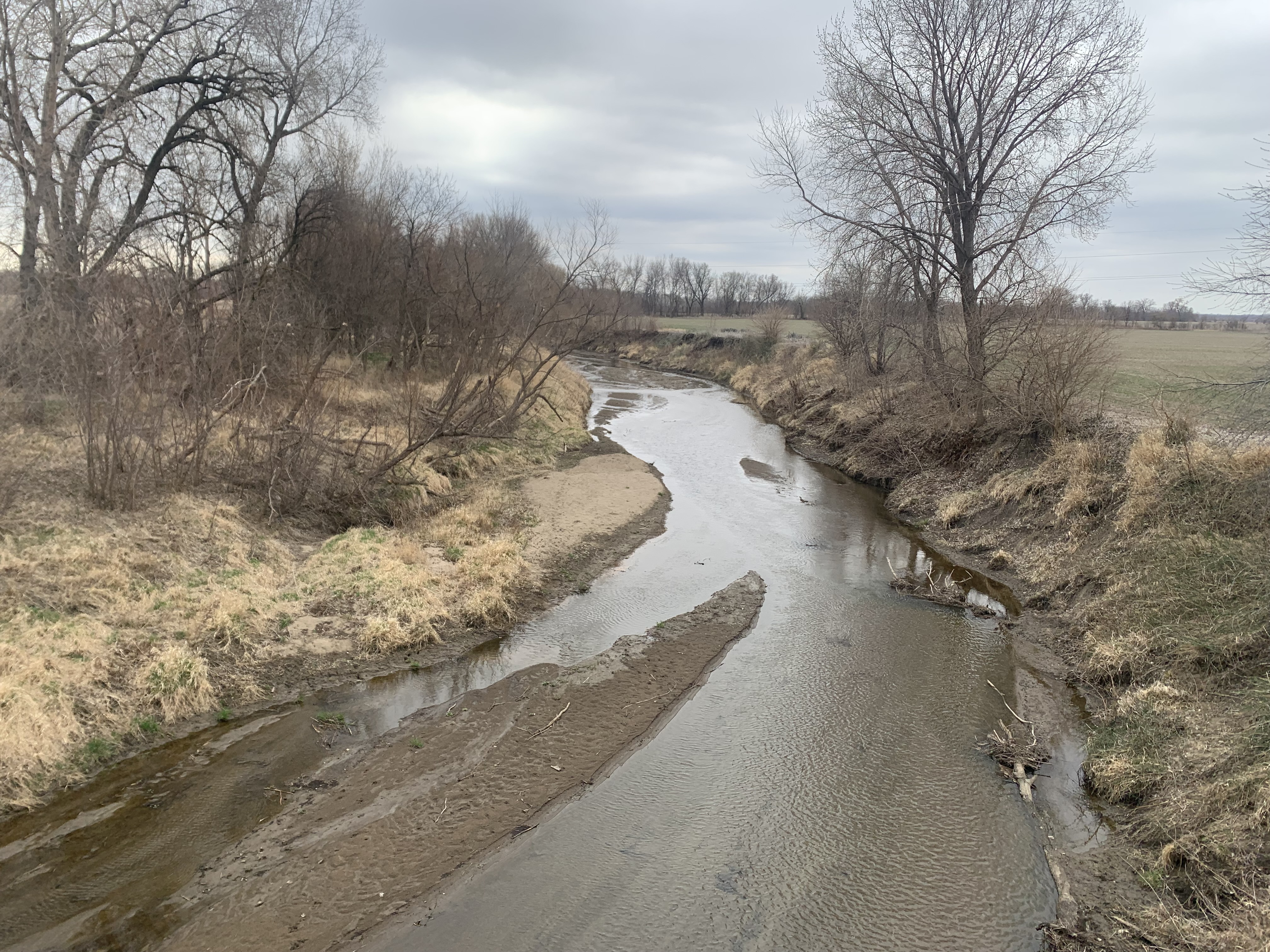
- Mill Creek on US Highway 136 bridge just west of Burlington Junction

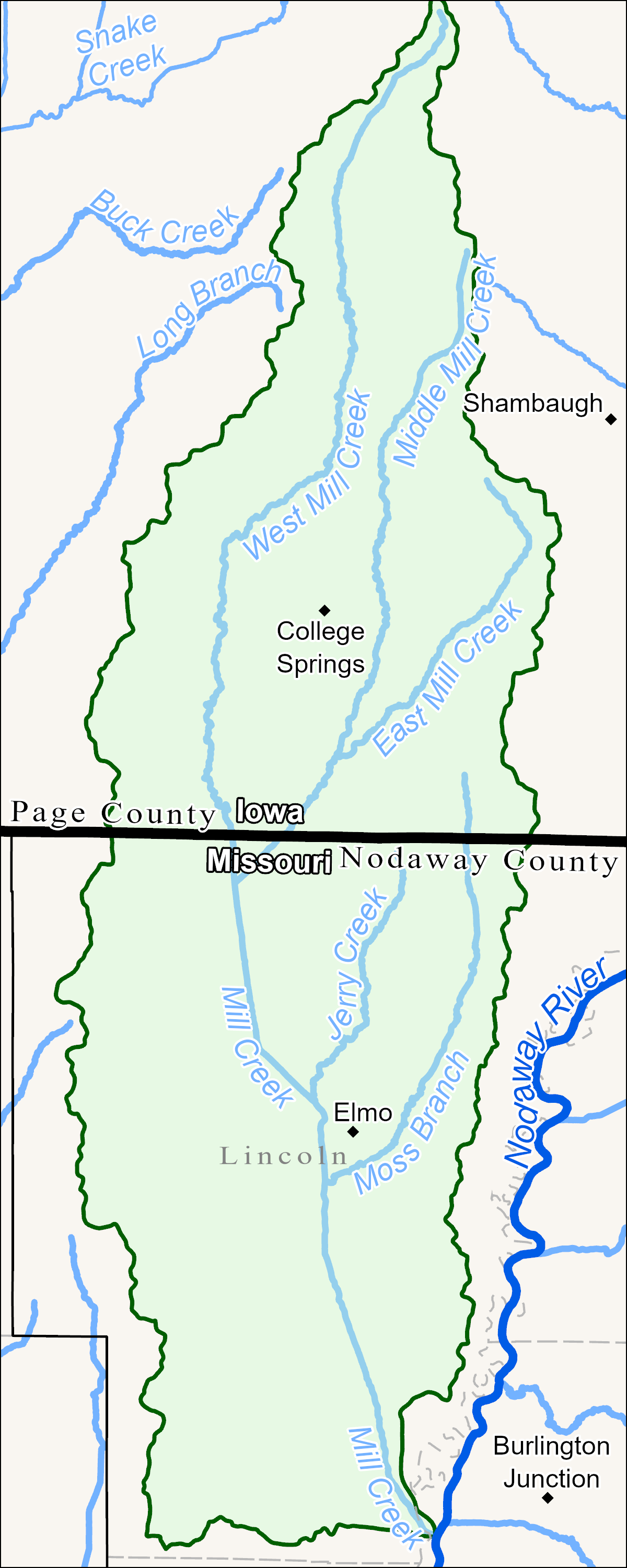
- Watershed map of Mill Creek

Location
- Country: United States
- State: Missouri
- County: Nodaway

Physical characteristics
- Source: Confluence of East Mill Creek and West Mill Creek
  - location: Lincoln Township
  - coordinates: 40°34′06″N 95°08′40″W
  - elevation: 990 ft (300 m)
- Mouth: Nodaway River
  - location: Nodaway Township
  - coordinates: 40°26′24″N 95°05′36″W
  - elevation: 906 ft (276 m)
- Length: 12.3 mi (19.8 km)
- Basin size: 87.5 sq mi (227 km^{2})

Basin features
- Progression: Mill Creek → Nodaway River → Missouri River → Mississippi River → Atlantic Ocean
- Stream gradient 7.6 ft/mi (1.44 m/km)

Mill Creek is a stream in northwestern Nodaway County, Missouri. It is a tributary to the Nodaway River and is 12.3 miles long. The city of Elmo is located along the stream about 6 miles before its mouth.

== Etymology ==
Mill Creek was so named on account of a watermill near its course. Both East Mill Creek and West Mill Creek have been denoted as Mill Creek.

== History ==
Joseph Hutson was the first settler in Lincoln Township, and he settled along Mill Creek on October 29th, 1840. He set up mill irons, along what was then called Hutson's Creek, in 1842.

== Geography ==
Mill Creek is a right tributary of the Nodaway River and joins it 46.6 miles before its mouth in the Missouri River. It is the largest tributary of the Nodaway River in Missouri. About half of the Mill Creek watershed is in Page County, Iowa.

=== Course ===
Mill Creek begins at the confluence of the East Mill Creek and the West Mill Creek about 0.8 miles south of the Iowa/Missouri border. The stream flows about 3.5 miles south-southeast to where it passes to the west of Elmo. The stream continues southeasterly 6 miles before it enters the Nodaway River just south of US 136 one mile west of Burlington Junction.

=== Hydrology ===
There are two permitted wastewater treatment facilities that flow into Mill Creek: Elmo and College Springs. About half of the Mill Creek watershed is in Page County, Iowa. The following lakes are in the Mill Creek watershed: Pruitt Lake, Hoover Frankum Reservoir (A-11), and Hoover Frankum Reservoir (B-20).

=== Tributaries ===
The stream has four direct and one indirect tributaries. The four direct tributaries join Mill Creek in Nodaway County and are: West Mill Creek, East Mill Creek, Jerry Creek, and Moss Branch. Middle Mill Creek is an indirect tributary via East Mill Creek and is located in Page County, Iowa.

=== Crossings ===
There are two highways that cross Mill Creek: US 136 and Route C.

== See also ==
- Tributaries of the Nodaway River
- List of rivers of Missouri
