= South Page Community School District =

Public school district in College Springs, Iowa, United States

Coordinates: 40.621123°N 95.119784°W

Location
- College Springs, Iowa Page County, Iowa United States
- Coordinates: 40.621123, -95.119784

District information
- Type: Public
- Grades: K–6
- Established: 1959
- Superintendent: Jeff Privia
- Schools: 1
- Budget: $3,703,000 (2020-21)
- NCES District ID: 1926670

Students and staff
- Students: 113 (2022=23)
- Teachers: 15.57 FTE
- Staff: 20.04 FTE
- Student–teacher ratio: 7.26
- Athletic conference: Corner Conference (Iowa)
- District mascot: Rebels
- Colors: Black and White

Other information
- Website: www.southpageschools.com

South Page Community School District, or South Page Schools, is a small, rural, public school district headquartered in College Springs, Iowa.

It is entirely in Page County, and includes College Springs, Blanchard, Braddyville, Coin, and Shambaugh.

== History ==
It was formed in 1959 by combining the Braddyville, Coin, Amity (College Springs), and Blanchard districts, as well as several rural districts, which included Shambaugh. Although the elementary and grades 7–12 are housed in College Springs, at one time there were two elementary schools located in Braddyville and Coin. The high school has always been located in College Springs. The 1960 K–12 enrollment was approximately 700 but enrollment has plummeted to less than 200 students. Although some of the sharp decline is due to an open enrollment policy in Iowa, the great majority is due to population shift in rural areas as a result of smaller families, larger farms and lack of economic opportunity. Gregg Cruikshank served as the shared Sidney/ South Page superintendent from 2009- 2017. He was then succeeded by Tim Hood in the same role until 2019 when Mr. Hood assumed the roll of East Mills superintendent in addition to his duties at Sidney and South Page. Hood retired in 2024 and the district opted to share the services of Jeff Privia as superintendent with Clarinda.

South Page began sending High school students to Clarinda High School for half the day in 2019. Clarinda ended the agreement in 2022, citing overcrowding of classes. The district engaged in a similar agreement with the Bedford Community School District until 2024 when a whole grade sharing agreement was reached with Clarinda for grades 7-12 thus closing South Page High School.

== Schools ==
The district operates one school in College Springs:

- South Page Elementary School

=== South Page High School ===
==== Athletics ====
The Rebels competed in the Corner Conference until the end of the 2018-19 school year.

South Page now co-ops sports with Bedford as the "Bedford Bulldogs". They compete in the following sports:

- Cross Country (boys and girls)
- Volleyball
- Football
- Basketball (boys and girls)
- Wrestling
- Track and Field (boys and girls)
- Golf (boys and girls)
- Baseball
- Softball
- Bowling

== Notable alumni ==
- Joe Henderson, a former state champion miler and now a leading author on running.

== See also ==
- List of school districts in Iowa
- List of high schools in Iowa
