= Lincoln Township, Nodaway County, Missouri =

Township in Nodaway County, Missouri, U.S.

Lincoln Township
- Township
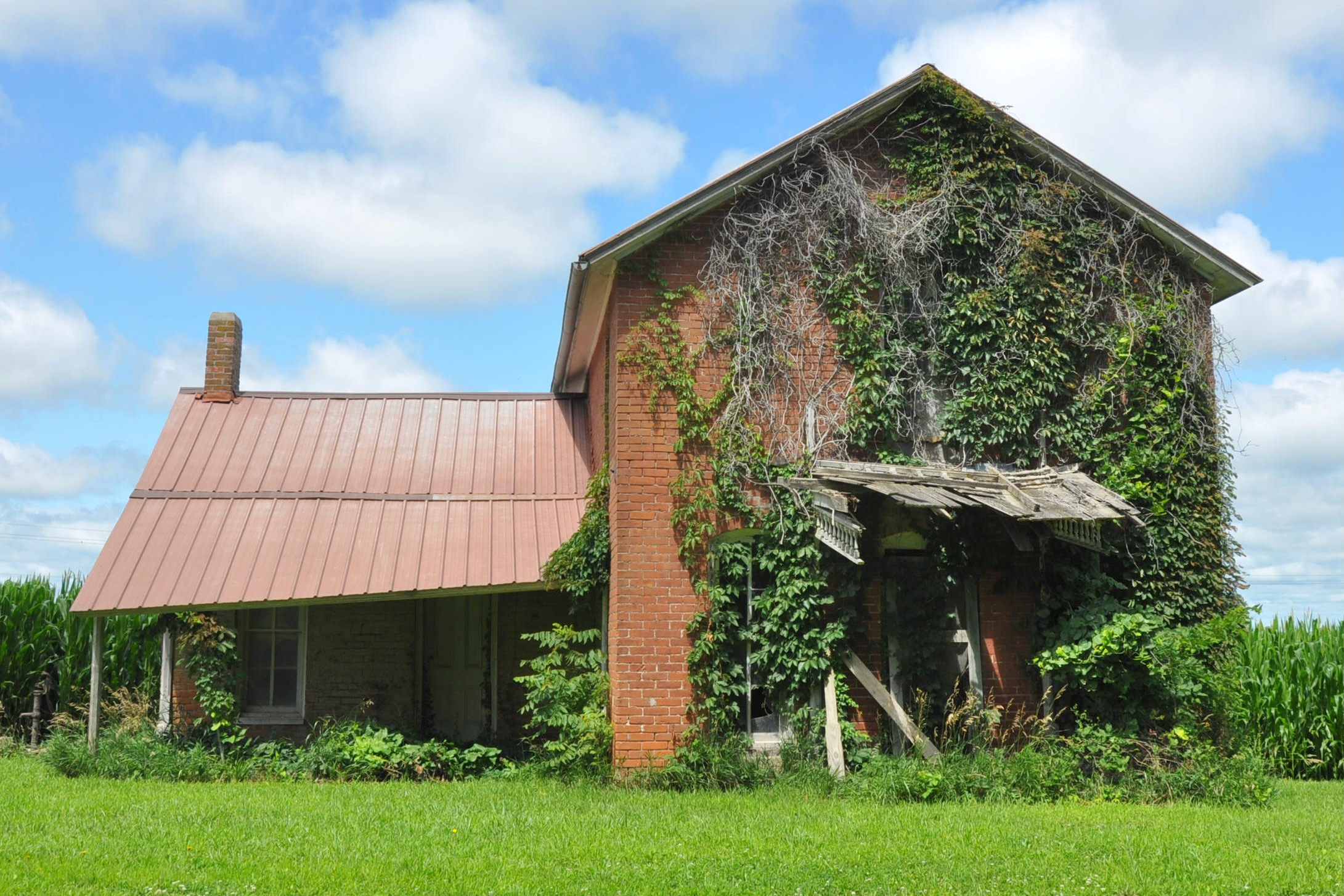
- Possum Walk Hotel located in eastern Lincoln Township

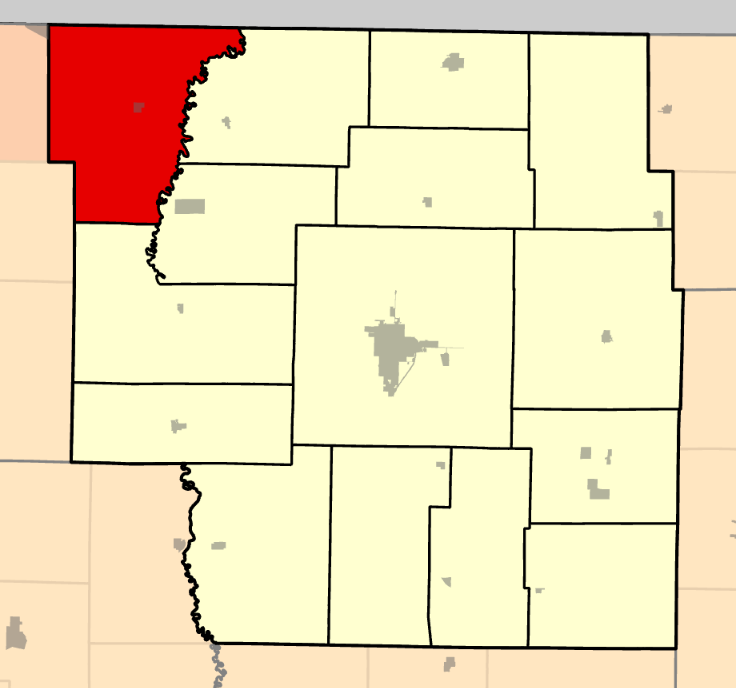
- Coordinates: 40°30′28″N 95°08′10″W
- Country: United States
- State: Missouri
- County: Nodaway
- Erected: 1866

Area
  - Total: 66.03 sq mi (171.0 km^{2})
  - Land: 65.96 sq mi (170.8 km^{2})
  - Water: 0.07 sq mi (0.18 km^{2}) 0.11%
- Elevation: 981 ft (299 m)

Population (2020)
  - Total: 323
  - Density: 4.9/sq mi (1.9/km^{2})
- FIPS code: 29-14742824
- GNIS feature ID: 767092

Lincoln Township is a township in Nodaway County, Missouri, United States. At the 2020 census, its population was 323. It contains about 68 sections.

== History ==
Lincoln Township was erected on June 14, 1866, when it was divided from Atchison Township, and named after President Abraham Lincoln. Lamar Station was platted in 1871 to be between Elmo and Clearmont but when the railroad route changed the plan decayed. Some buildings were moved to other nearby towns.

== Geography ==
It's bounded on the east by the Nodaway River and contains one town, Elmo which lies in the center. Dawsonville was a hamlet that existed in its southeast 2.5 miles northwest of Burlington Junction.

== Transportation ==
The following highways travel through the township:

- U.S. Route 71
- U.S. Route 136
- Route C
- Route D
- Route KK
- Route PP
- Route UU
- Route YY
