= West Nodaway R-I School District =

School district in Missouri, U.S.

West Nodaway R-I School District is a school district headquartered in unincorporated Nodaway County, Missouri, near Burlington Junction.

The district includes Burlington Junction, Clearmont, Elmo, and Quitman.

== History ==
In 2020 the West Nodaway School District agreed to enter into a sports cooperative program with Nodaway-Holt R-VII School District.

In 2020 the superintendent stated that the district may lay off some employees because it has too many employees unless it increases taxes. It had laid off four teachers earlier that year.

== Schools ==
- West Nodaway High School
- West Nodaway R-I Elementary School
