= West Nodaway High School =

Location
- 17665 US Hwy 136; Burlington Junction, Missouri 64428; United States
- Coordinates: 40°26′32″N 95°03′04″W

Information
- Type: Public
- Principal: Dr. Mitch Barnes
- Teaching staff: 9.85 (FTE)
- Grades: 7-12
- Enrollment: 95 (2023-2024)
- Student to teacher ratio: 9.64
- Color
- Mascot: Rocket
- Website: wnrockets.com

West Nodaway High School is a public high school in Burlington Junction, Missouri, serving grades 7–12.

It is a part of the West Nodaway R-I School District. The district includes Burlington Junction, Clearmont, Elmo, and Quitman.

== See also ==
- Education in Missouri
- List of colleges and universities in Missouri
- List of high schools in Missouri
- Missouri Department of Elementary and Secondary Education
