= Nodaway-Holt R-VII School District =

School district in Missouri

Nodaway-Holt R-VII School District is a school district headquartered in Graham, Missouri. It operates an elementary school in Maitland and a junior-senior high school in Graham, with the latter including the district headquarters.

A portion of the district is in Nodaway County, including Graham and Skidmore. The other portion, in Holt County, includes Maitland.

== History ==
Skidmore, Maitland, and Graham consolidated into Nodaway-Holt in 1968. K-3 was located in Skidmore, 4-8 in Maitland and 9-12 in Graham. The Skidmore building was later closed and the current building configuration of K-6 in Maitland and 7-12 in Graham was adopted.

Its previous high school building was built in 1938. In 2019 a new high school building was established. The district planned to demolish the 1938 facility on June 8, 2020.

The current high school building was scheduled to open in 2019.

== Demographics ==
There were 22 students in the Class of 2000.

== Athletics ==
In 2020 the West Nodaway School District agreed to enter into a sports cooperative program with Nodaway-Holt.
