= Possum Walk, Missouri =

Extinct hamlet in Missouri, U.S.

Coordinates: 40°29′40″N 95°05′04″W

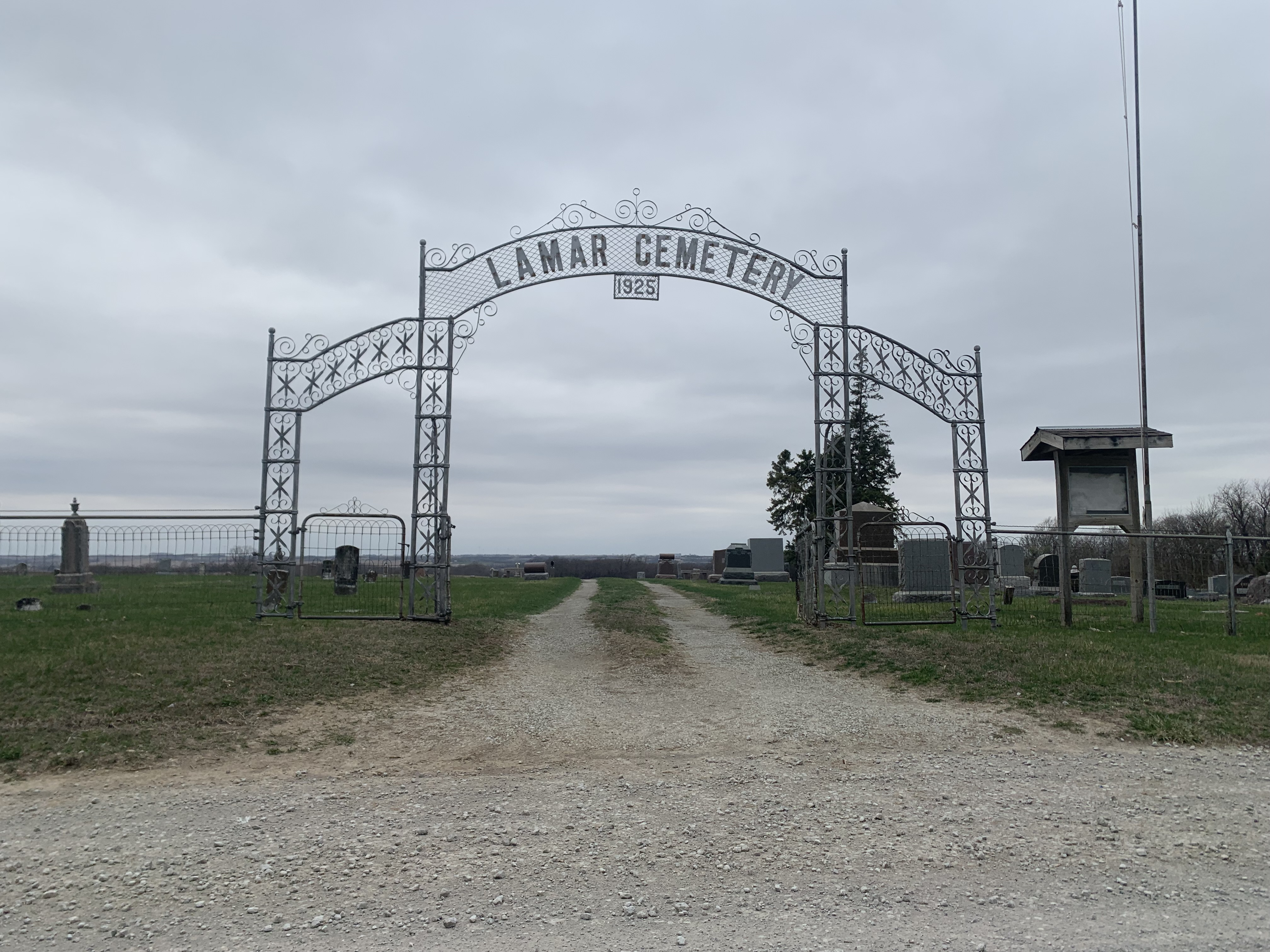
Lamar Cemetery at Possum Walk, Missouri AKA Lamar's Station, Missouri

Possum Walk is an extinct community in northwestern Nodaway County, in the U.S. state of Missouri.

The community was platted in January 1871 by John Lamar but with the building of Burlington Junction and Elmo at where the railway went, the hamlet decayed. It was located on the west side of the Nodaway River floodplain two miles southeast of the community of Elmo.

Possum Walk is an invented name. Variant names include Lamar or Lamar Station, named after the LaMar family that operated the Possum Walk Hotel that is now a national landmark.
