= Elmo, Missouri =

- City
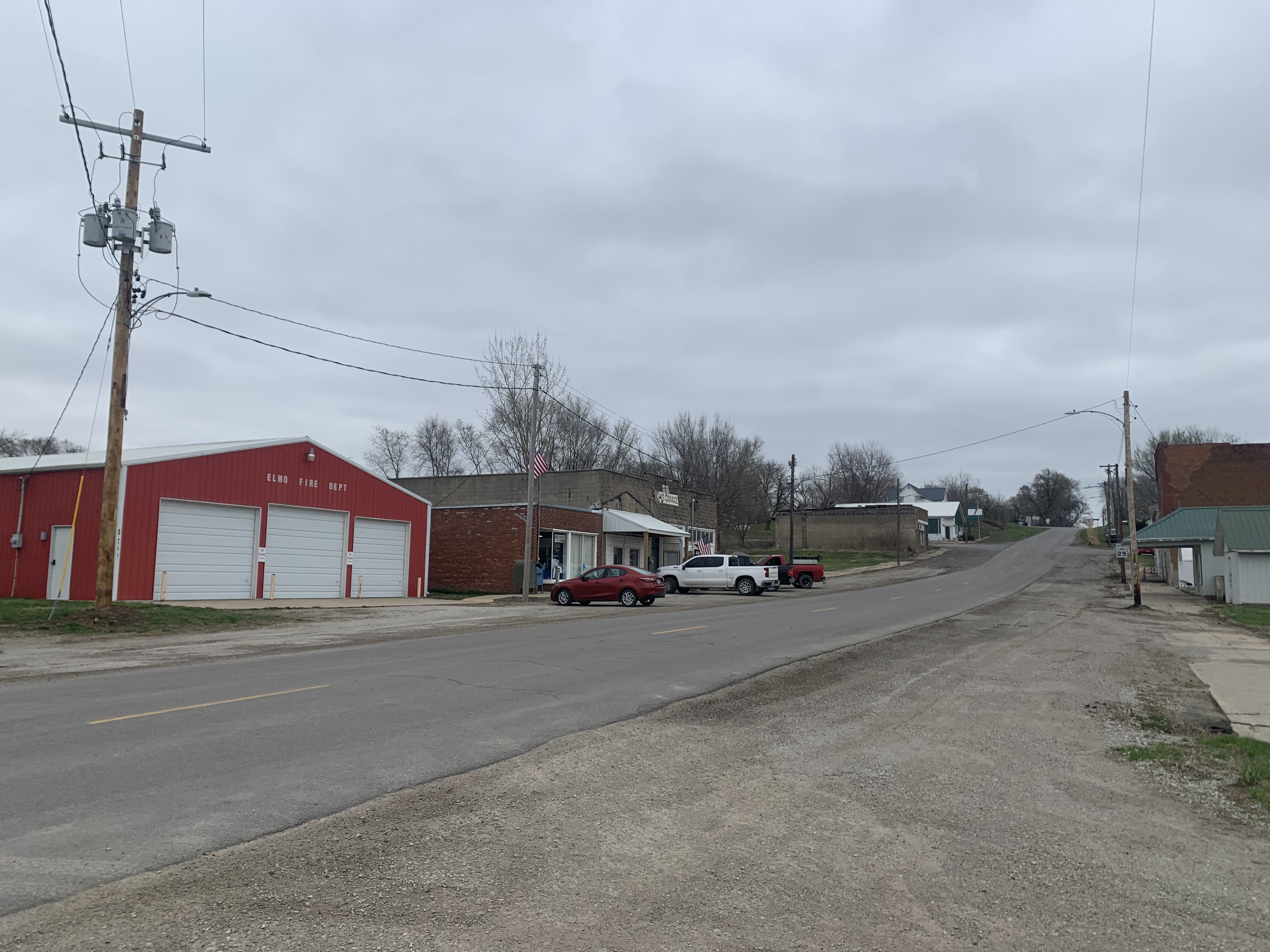
- Elmo from the west on Route KK

- Location of Elmo, Missouri
- Coordinates: 40°31′07″N 95°07′01″W
- Country: United States
- State: Missouri
- County: Nodaway
- Township: Lincoln
- Platted: 1879

Area
  - Total: 0.22 sq mi (0.56 km^{2})
  - Land: 0.22 sq mi (0.56 km^{2})
  - Water: 0 sq mi (0.00 km^{2})
- Elevation: 1,014 ft (309 m)

Population (2020)
  - Total: 114
  - Density: 525.5/sq mi (202.91/km^{2})
- Time zone: UTC-6 (Central (CST))
  - Summer (DST): UTC-5 (CDT)
- ZIP code: 64445
- Area code: 660
- FIPS code: 29-22024
- GNIS feature ID: 2394674

Elmo is a city in Nodaway County, Missouri, United States. The population was 114 at the 2020 Census.

== History ==
Elmo, first called Ebbony, was platted in 1879, when the Wabash Railroad was extended to that point. The community most likely was named after the novel St. Elmo. A post office called Elmo has been in operation since 1886.

== Geography ==
According to the United States Census Bureau, the city has a total area of 0.23 square miles (0.60 km^{2}), all land. Elmo is about five miles west of Clearmont, four miles south of the Iowa border, and about eleven mile east of Westboro in Atchison County. Mill Creek flows past Elmo to its southwest; Jerry Creek and Moss Branch pass by Elmo, to the north and the south respectively, and join Mill Creek nearby Elmo.

== Demographics ==
Historical population
Census	Pop.	Note	%±
1880	87		—
1910	342		—
1920	309		−9.6%
1930	313		1.3%
1940	318		1.6%
1950	258		−18.9%
1960	213		−17.4%
1970	204		−4.2%
1980	215		5.4%
1990	179		−16.7%
2000	166		−7.3%
2010	168		1.2%
2020	114		−32.1%
U.S. Decennial Census

=== 2010 census ===
As of the census of 2010, there were 168 people, 71 households, and 43 families living in the city. The population density was 730.4 inhabitants per square mile (282.0/km^{2}). There were 83 housing units at an average density of 360.9 per square mile (139.3/km^{2}). The racial makeup of the city was 97.0% White, 1.2% Native American, and 1.8% from two or more races.

There were 71 households, of which 32.4% had children under the age of 18 living with them, 46.5% were married couples living together, 8.5% had a female householder with no husband present, 5.6% had a male householder with no wife present, and 39.4% were non-families. 31.0% of all households were made up of individuals, and 16.9% had someone living alone who was 65 years of age or older. The average household size was 2.37 and the average family size was 3.02.

The median age in the city was 38.7 years. 19.6% of residents were under the age of 18; 16.7% were between the ages of 18 and 24; 23.3% were from 25 to 44; 24.4% were from 45 to 64; and 16.1% were 65 years of age or older. The gender makeup of the city was 51.2% male and 48.8% female.

=== 2000 census ===
As of the census of 2000, there were 166 people, 78 households, and 45 families living in the city. The population density was 771.2 inhabitants per square mile (297.8/km^{2}). There were 95 housing units at an average density of 441.4 per square mile (170.4/km^{2}). The racial makeup of the city was 100.00% White.

There were 78 households, out of which 24.4% had children under the age of 18 living with them, 47.4% were married couples living together, 7.7% had a female householder with no husband present, and 42.3% were non-families. 41.0% of all households were made up of individuals, and 25.6% had someone living alone who was 65 years of age or older. The average household size was 2.13 and the average family size was 2.87.

In the city the population was spread out, with 25.3% under the age of 18, 6.0% from 18 to 24, 22.9% from 25 to 44, 21.7% from 45 to 64, and 24.1% who were 65 years of age or older. The median age was 42 years. For every 100 females there were 84.4 males. For every 100 females age 18 and over, there were 85.1 males.

The median income for a household in the city was $20,833, and the median income for a family was $27,500. Males had a median income of $25,417 versus $9,375 for females. The per capita income for the city was $12,966. About 15.6% of families and 24.2% of the population were below the poverty line, including 28.9% of those under the age of eighteen and 16.7% of those 65 or over.

== Education ==
It is in the West Nodaway R-I School District. The secondary school is West Nodaway High School.
