= Shambaugh, Iowa =

- City
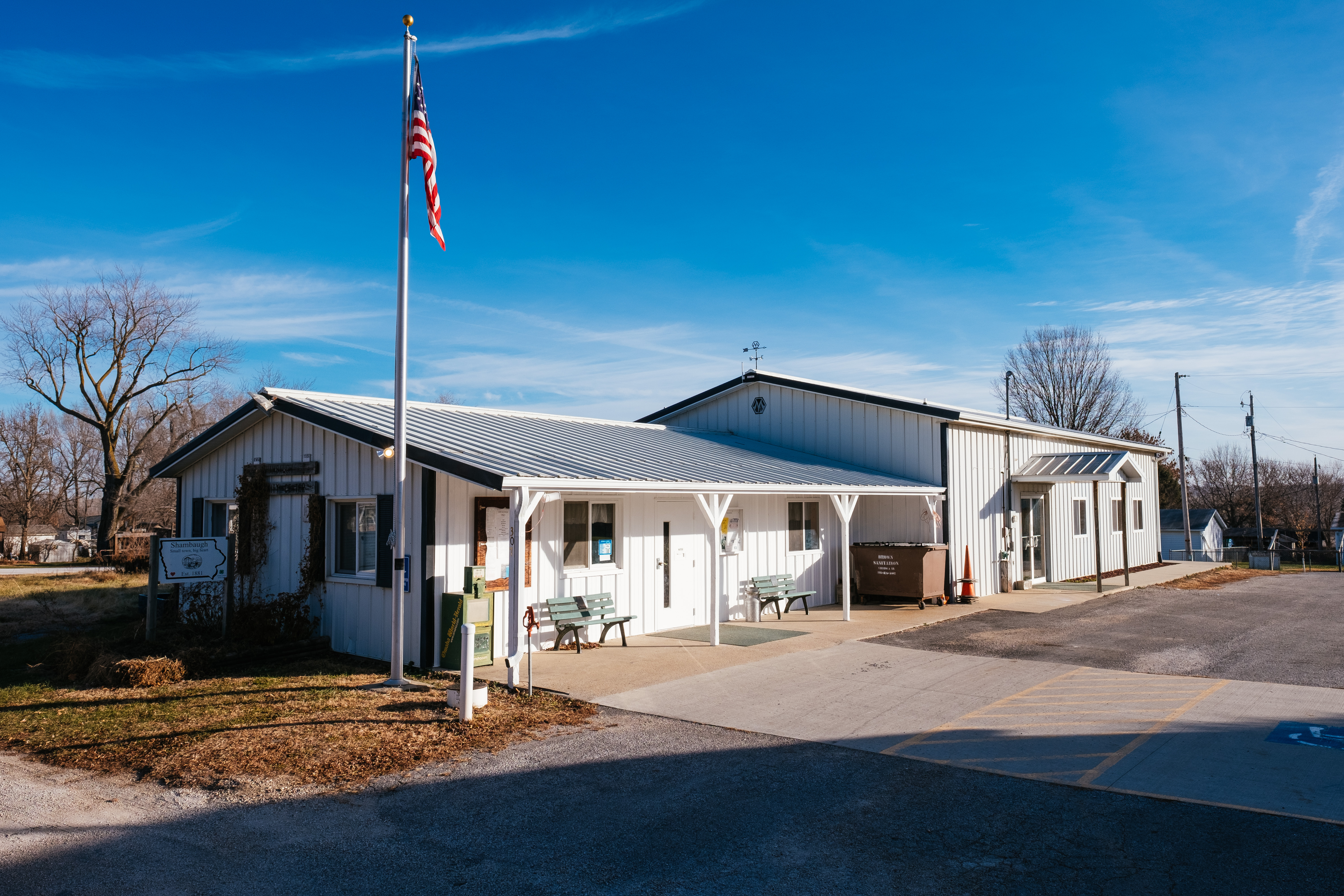
- Shambaugh Community Center
- Motto: Small town, big heart
- Location of Shambaugh, Iowa
- Coordinates: 40°39′27″N 95°02′07″W
- Country: USA
- State: Iowa
- County: Page

Area
  - Total: 0.36 sq mi (0.94 km^{2})
  - Land: 0.36 sq mi (0.94 km^{2})
  - Water: 0 sq mi (0.00 km^{2})
- Elevation: 1,001 ft (305 m)

Population (2020)
  - Total: 159
  - Density: 437.4/sq mi (168.89/km^{2})
- Time zone: UTC-6 (Central (CST))
  - Summer (DST): UTC-5 (CDT)
- ZIP code: 51651
- Area code: 712
- FIPS code: 19-71895
- GNIS feature ID: 2395855
- Website: shambaughia.weebly.com

Shambaugh is a city in Page County, Iowa, United States. The population was 159 at the time of the 2020 census.

== History ==
Shambaugh was laid out in 1881 as a depot on the Chicago, Burlington and Quincy Railroad. It was named for its founder, James Shambaugh.

== Geography ==
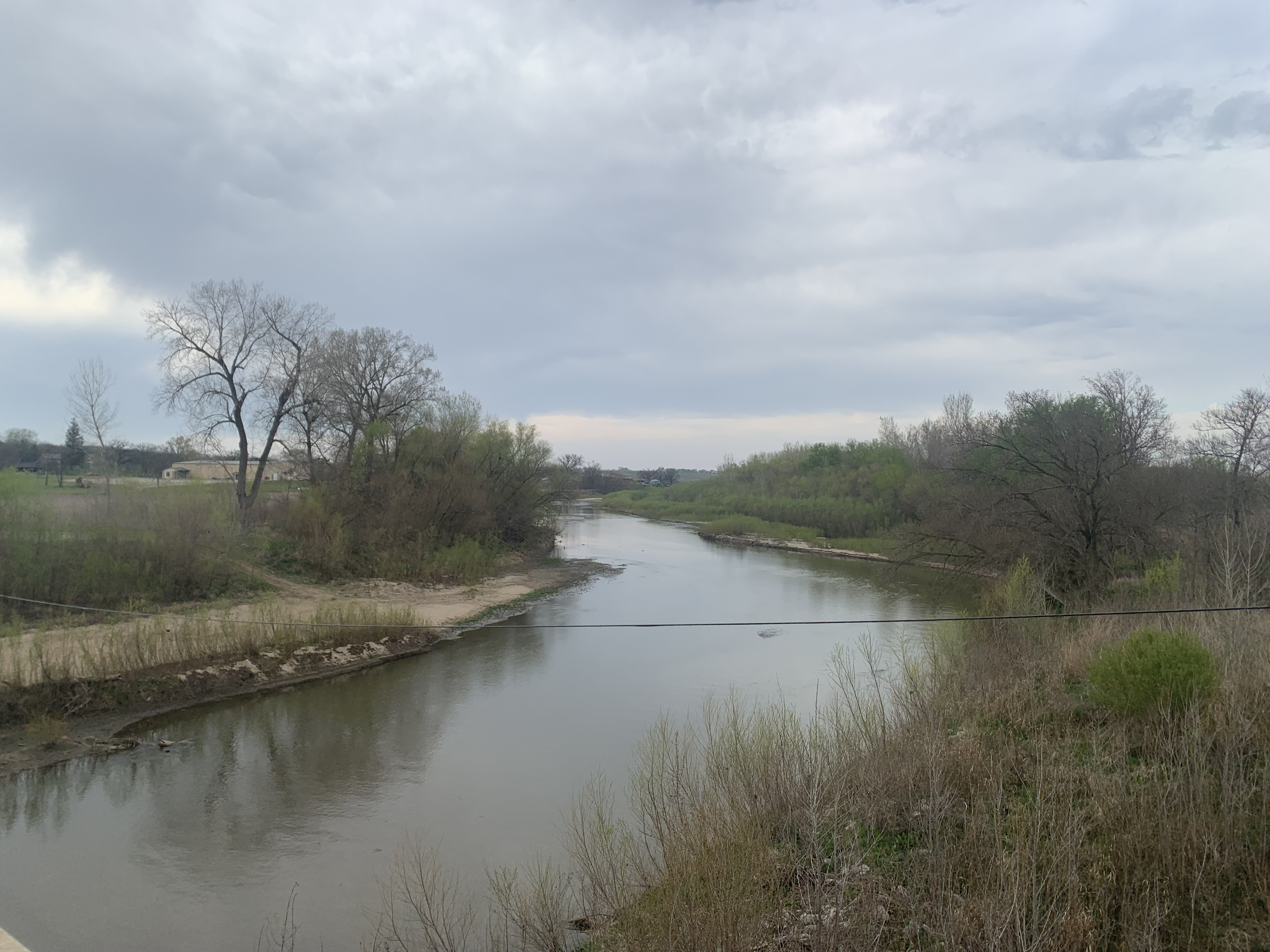
The West Nodaway River at County Road J53 bridge just east of Shambaugh

Shambaugh is located along the West Nodaway River.

According to the United States Census Bureau, the city has a total area of 0.36 square miles (0.93 km^{2}), all land.

== Demographics ==
Historical populations
Year	Pop.	±%
1910	245	—
1920	250	+2.0%
1930	278	+11.2%
1940	269	−3.2%
1950	251	−6.7%
1960	206	−17.9%
1970	178	−13.6%
1980	197	+10.7%
1990	190	−3.6%
2000	188	−1.1%
2010	191	+1.6%
2020	159	−16.8%
Source:"U.S. Census website". United States Census Bureau. and Iowa Data Center; Source: U.S. Decennial Census

=== 2020 census ===
As of the census of 2020, there were 159 people, 74 households, and 45 families residing in the city. The population density was 437.4 inhabitants per square mile (168.9/km^{2}). There were 83 housing units at an average density of 228.3 per square mile (88.2/km^{2}). The racial makeup of the city was 97.5% White, 0.0% Black or African American, 0.0% Native American, 0.0% Asian, 0.0% Pacific Islander, 0.0% from other races and 2.5% from two or more races. Hispanic or Latino persons of any race comprised 0.6% of the population.

Of the 74 households, 27.0% of which had children under the age of 18 living with them, 47.3% were married couples living together, 4.1% were cohabitating couples, 29.7% had a female householder with no spouse or partner present and 18.9% had a male householder with no spouse or partner present. 39.2% of all households were non-families. 35.1% of all households were made up of individuals, 13.5% had someone living alone who was 65 years old or older.

The median age in the city was 51.6 years. 22.6% of the residents were under the age of 20; 6.3% were between the ages of 20 and 24; 15.7% were from 25 and 44; 35.8% were from 45 and 64; and 19.5% were 65 years of age or older. The gender makeup of the city was 46.5% male and 53.5% female.

=== 2010 census ===
As of the census of 2010, there were 191 people, 80 households, and 50 families living in the city. The population density was 530.6 inhabitants per square mile (204.9/km^{2}). There were 90 housing units at an average density of 250.0 per square mile (96.5/km^{2}). The racial makeup of the city was 100.0% White. Hispanic or Latino of any race were 1.6% of the population.

There were 80 households, of which 28.8% had children under the age of 18 living with them, 48.8% were married couples living together, 8.8% had a female householder with no husband present, 5.0% had a male householder with no wife present, and 37.5% were non-families. 35.0% of all households were made up of individuals, and 17.6% had someone living alone who was 65 years of age or older. The average household size was 2.39 and the average family size was 3.12.

The median age in the city was 44.5 years. 26.2% of residents were under the age of 18; 6.3% were between the ages of 18 and 24; 18.3% were from 25 to 44; 27.7% were from 45 to 64; and 21.5% were 65 years of age or older. The gender makeup of the city was 50.3% male and 49.7% female.

=== 2000 census ===
As of the census of 2000, there were 188 people, 80 households, and 51 families living in the city. The population density was 506.9 inhabitants per square mile (195.7/km^{2}). There were 93 housing units at an average density of 250.8 per square mile (96.8/km^{2}). The racial makeup of the city was 99.47% White and 0.53% African American. Hispanic or Latino of any race were 2.13% of the population.

There were 80 households, out of which 26.3% had children under the age of 18 living with them, 56.3% were married couples living together, 5.0% had a female householder with no husband present, and 36.3% were non-families. 33.8% of all households were made up of individuals, and 18.8% had someone living alone who was 65 years of age or older. The average household size was 2.35 and the average family size was 3.06.

27.7% are under the age of 18, 3.7% from 18 to 24, 27.1% from 25 to 44, 23.9% from 45 to 64, and 17.6% who were 65 years of age or older. The median age was 39 years. For every 100 females, there were 95.8 males. For every 100 females age 18 and over, there were 94.3 males.

The median income for a household in the city was $40,375, and the median income for a family was $45,179. Males had a median income of $29,844 versus $18,125 for females. The per capita income for the city was $15,089. About 3.8% of families and 4.3% of the population were below the poverty line, including none of those under the age of eighteen and 8.1% of those 65 or over.

== Notable people ==
- Jay Laurence Lush (1896–1982), animal geneticist, was born in Shambaugh

== Churches ==
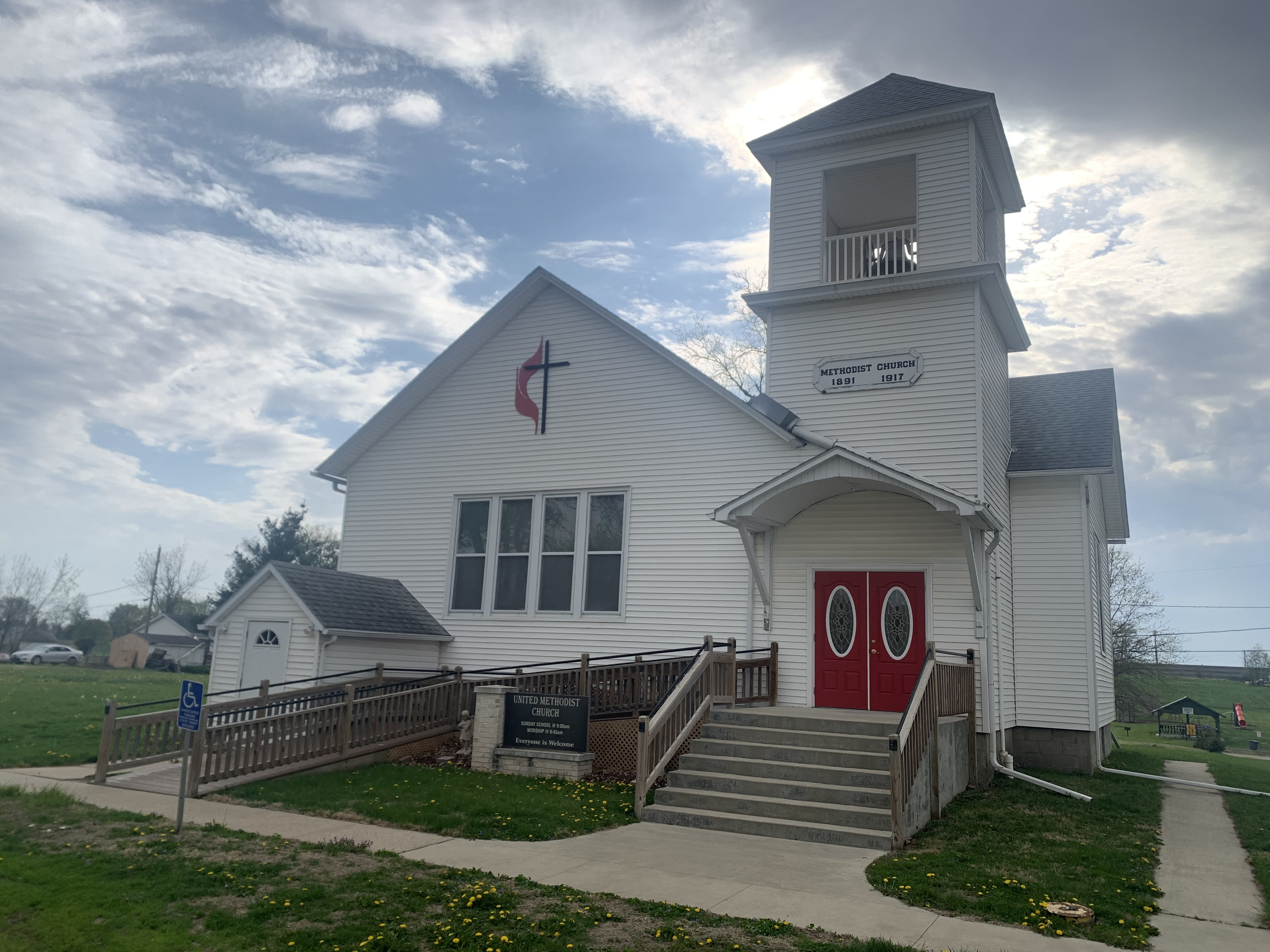
United Methodist Church in Shambaugh, Iowa

There are three churches in Shambaugh: Shambaugh United Methodist Church; First Church of God; and Harvest Fellowship.

== Education ==
It is in the South Page Community School District.

== Transportation ==
While there is no fixed-route transit service in Shambaugh, intercity bus service is provided by Jefferson Lines in nearby Clarinda.
