= Atchison Township, Nodaway County, Missouri =

Township in Nodaway County, Missouri, U.S.

Atchison Township
- Township
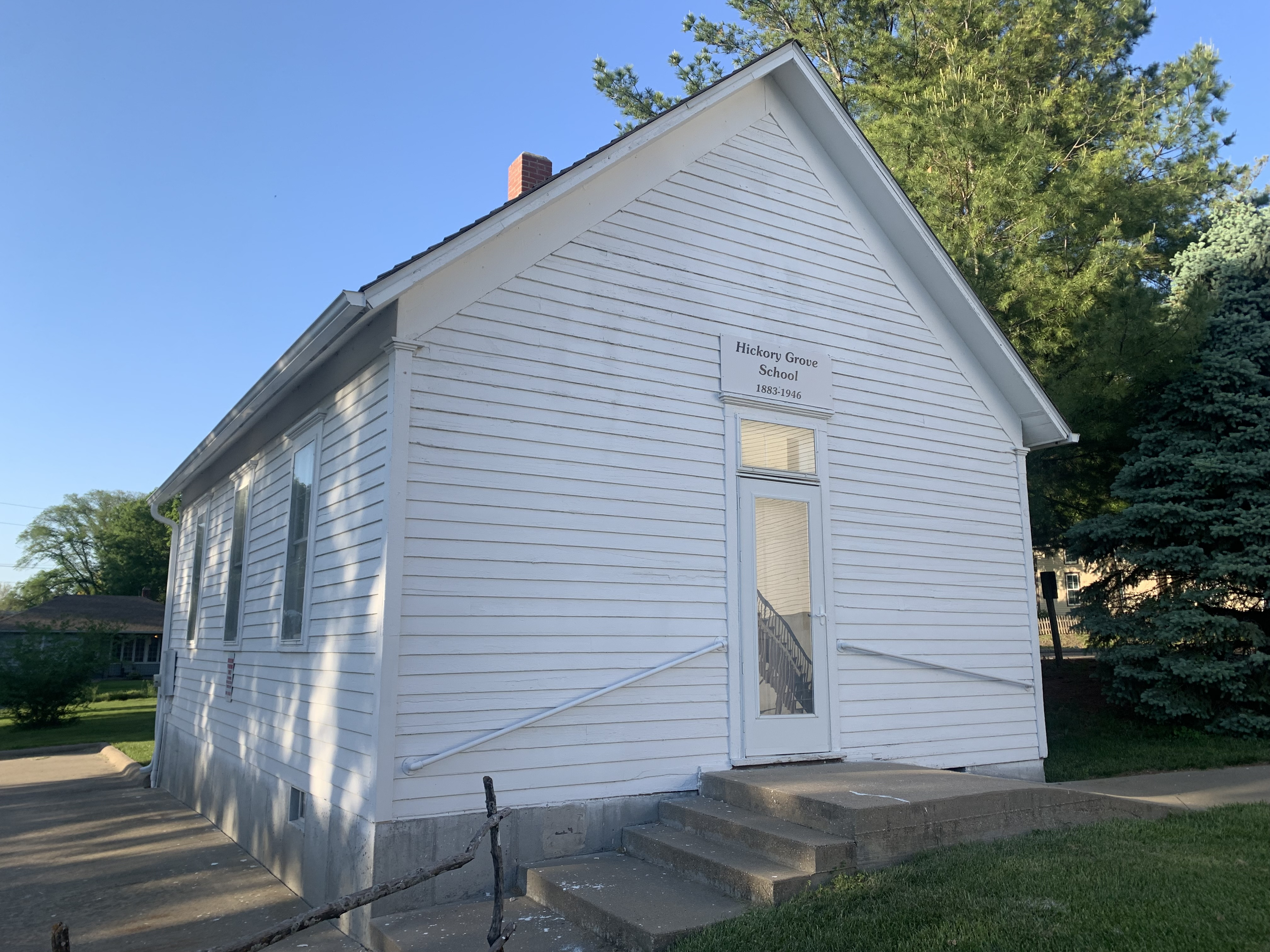
- Hickory Grove Schoolhouse originally east of Clearmont, now removed to Maryville

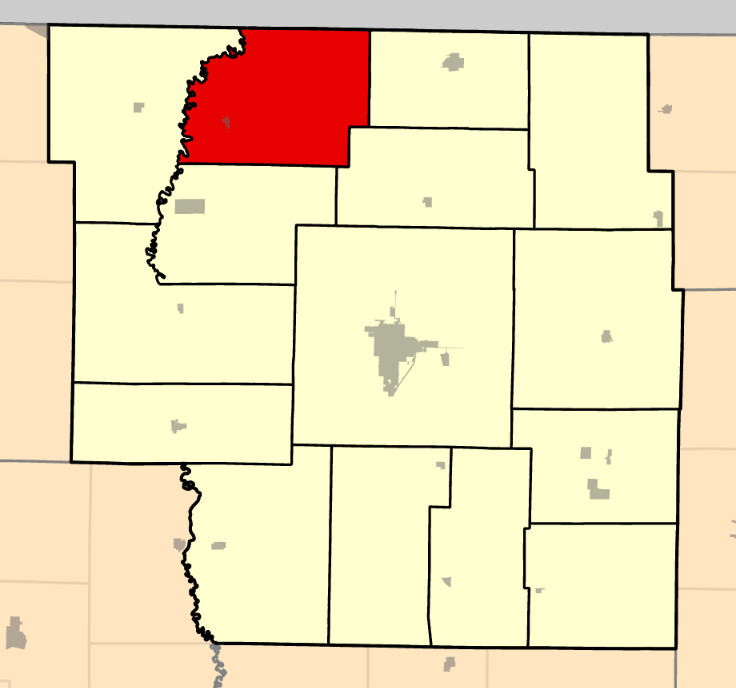
- Coordinates: 40°31′38″N 94°58′33″W
- Country: United States
- State: Missouri
- County: Nodaway
- Erected: 1845

Area
  - Total: 55.62 sq mi (144.1 km^{2})
  - Land: 55.53 sq mi (143.8 km^{2})
  - Water: 0.09 sq mi (0.23 km^{2}) 0.16%
- Elevation: 1,112 ft (339 m)

Population (2020)
  - Total: 386
  - Density: 7/sq mi (2.7/km^{2})
- FIPS code: 29-14702350
- GNIS feature ID: 767084

Atchison Township is a township in Nodaway County, Missouri, United States. At the 2020 census, its population was 386. The town of Clearmont lies in its southwest.

== History ==
Atchison Township was established in April 1845, and named after David Rice Atchison, a United States Senator from Missouri.

== Geography ==
Sink Creek sources from the center of this township and flows westerly, passes north of Clearmont, and deposits in the Nodaway River.

=== Settlements ===
Alonzo City was a settlement platted in 1857 by Alonzo Thompson in the northern portion of this township that existed in the 1860s, northeast of Clearmont near the Iowa border.

== Transportation ==
The following highways travel through the township:

- U.S. Route 71
- Route AD
- Route B
- Route C
- Route FF
- Route JJ
