= Amity Township, Page County, Iowa =

Township in Page County, Iowa, U.S.

Coordinates: 40°36′54″N 95°05′16″W

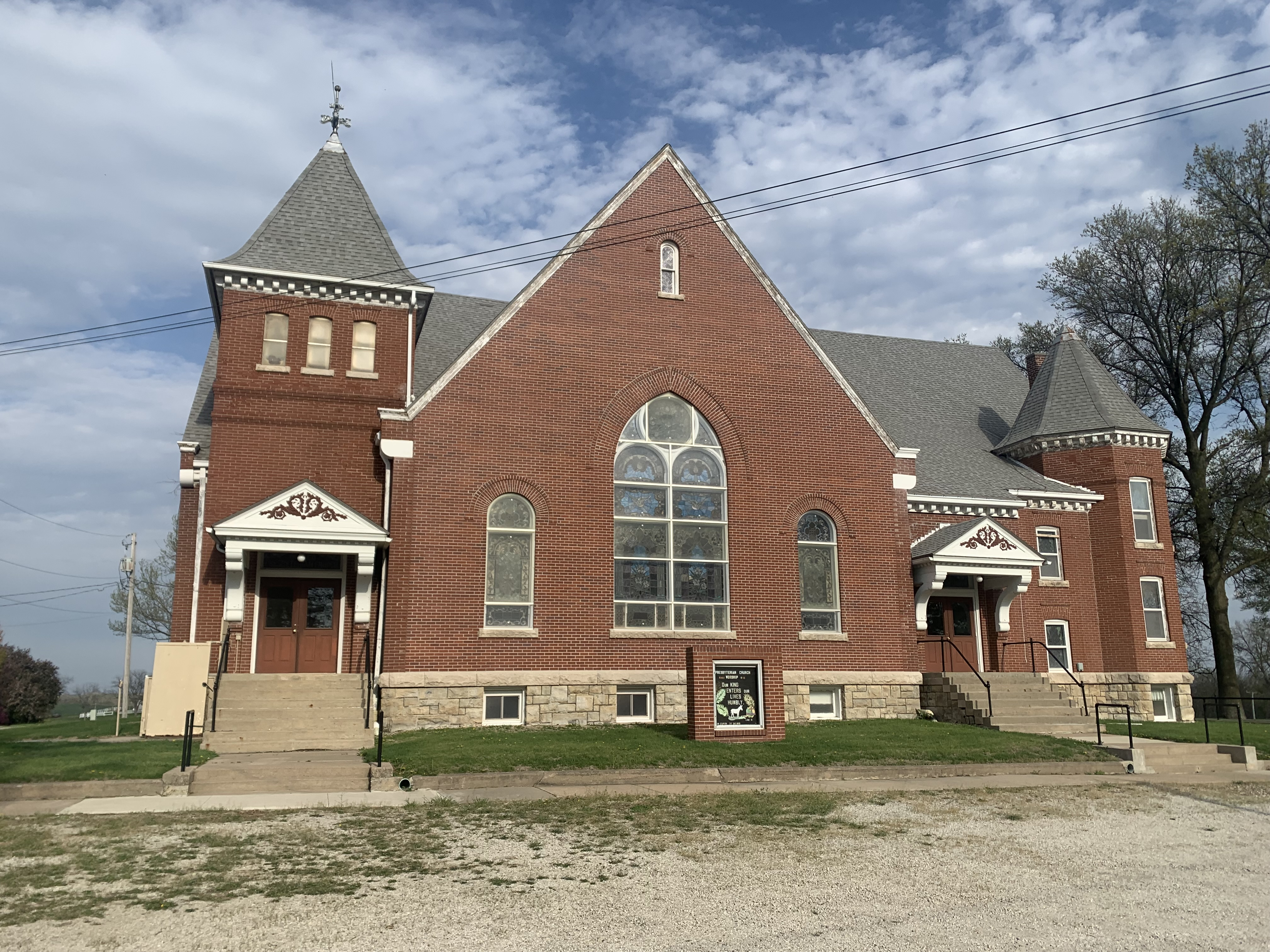
College Springs Presbyterian Church in western Amity Township.

Amity Township is a township in Page County, Iowa, United States.

== History ==
Amity Township (Township 67, Range 37) was surveyed in June 1852 by William Shields and established in 1858. Amity was the site of the first underground railroad station north of the Missouri border, in the southwest corner of Iowa.
