= Clearmont, Missouri =

- City
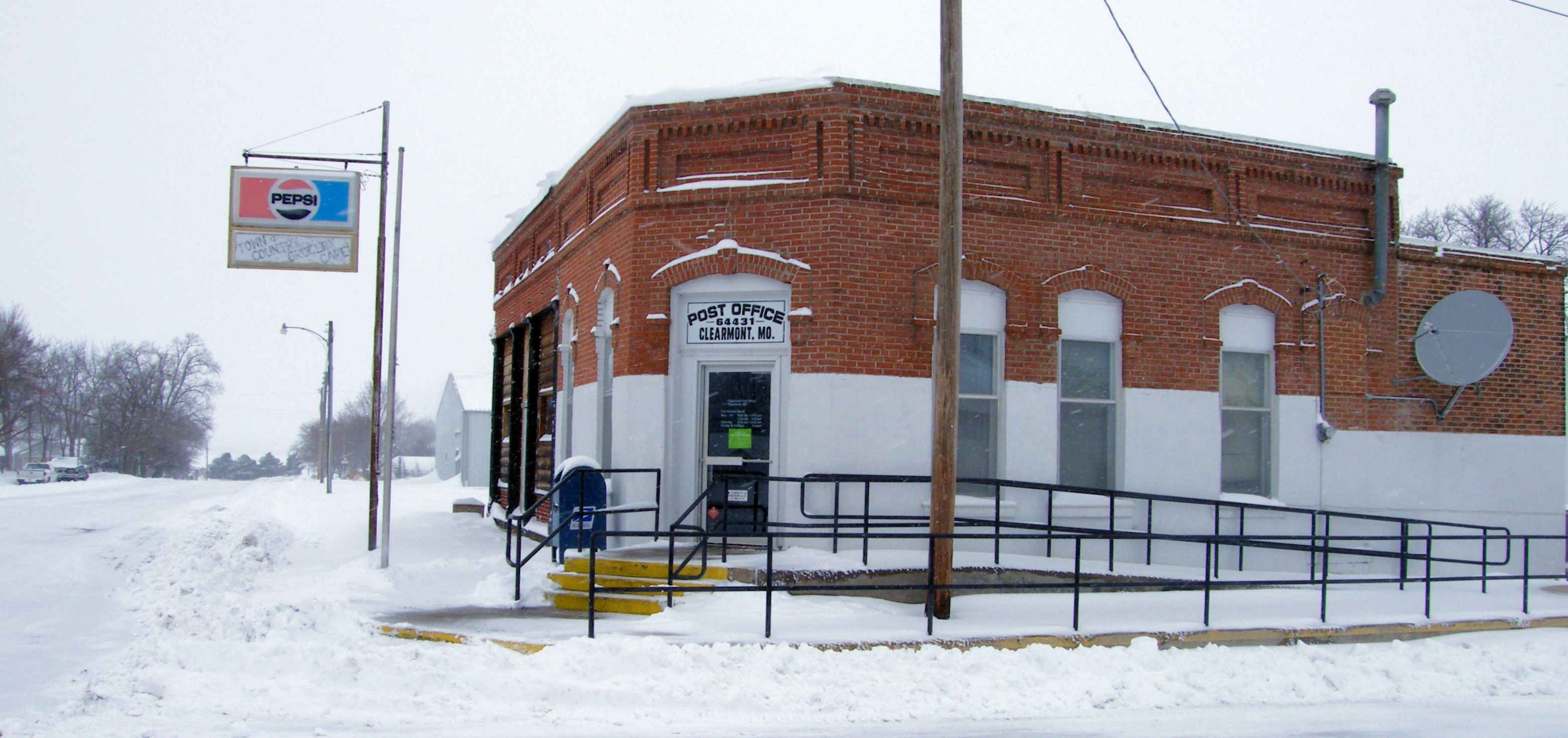
- Clearmont Post Office in February 2009

- Location of Clearmont, Missouri
- Coordinates: 40°30′29″N 95°01′57″W
- Country: United States
- State: Missouri
- County: Nodaway
- Township: Atchison
- Platted: 1857

Area
  - Total: 0.16 sq mi (0.42 km^{2})
  - Land: 0.16 sq mi (0.42 km^{2})
  - Water: 0 sq mi (0.00 km^{2})
- Elevation: 971 ft (296 m)

Population (2020)
  - Total: 158
  - Density: 966.7/sq mi (373.25/km^{2})
- Time zone: UTC-6 (Central (CST))
  - Summer (DST): UTC-5 (CDT)
- ZIP code: 64431
- Area code: 660
- FIPS code: 29-14662
- GNIS feature ID: 2393553

Clearmont is a city in northwestern Nodaway County, Missouri, United States. The population was 158 at the 2020 census.

== History ==
Clearmont was laid out in 1857 by Alonzo Thompson. Variant spellings include Clairmont, Clearmound and Claremont, some say the community was named after nearby Clear Creek, while others believe the name is a transfer from Clermont, Indiana. A post office called Clearmont has been in operation since 1881.

== Geography ==
Clearmont is located at the intersection of US Route 71 and Missouri Route C. Braddyville, Iowa is four miles to the north just north of the Missouri-Iowa state line. Elmo is 4.5 miles to the west on Route C and Burlington Junction is about five miles to the southwest. Clear Creek flows past the south side of the community to join the Nodaway River two miles to the southwest.

According to the United States Census Bureau, the city has a total area of 0.16 square miles (0.41 km^{2}), all land.

== Demographics ==
Historical population
Census	Pop.	Note	%±
1890	246		—
1900	348		41.5%
1910	263		−24.4%
1920	282		7.2%
1930	327		16.0%
1940	243		−25.7%
1950	283		16.5%
1960	292		3.2%
1970	226		−22.6%
1980	261		15.5%
1990	175		−33.0%
2000	191		9.1%
2010	170		−11.0%
2020	158		−7.1%
U.S. Decennial Census

=== 2010 census ===
As of the census of 2010, there were 170 people, 90 households, and 51 families living in the city. The population density was 1,062.5 inhabitants per square mile (410.2/km^{2}). There were 110 housing units at an average density of 687.5 per square mile (265.4/km^{2}). The racial makeup of the city was 98.8% White and 1.2% from two or more races.

There were 90 households, of which 17.8% had children under the age of 18 living with them, 50.0% were married couples living together, 5.6% had a female householder with no husband present, 1.1% had a male householder with no wife present, and 43.3% were non-families. 37.8% of all households were made up of individuals, and 22.2% had someone living alone who was 65 years of age or older. The average household size was 1.89 and the average family size was 2.47.

The median age in the city was 51.5 years. 13.5% of residents were under the age of 18; 5.8% were between the ages of 18 and 24; 20.6% were from 25 to 44; 26.5% were from 45 to 64; and 33.5% were 65 years of age or older. The gender makeup of the city was 48.2% male and 51.8% female.

=== 2000 census ===
As of the census of 2000, there were 191 people, 98 households, and 53 families living in the city. The population density was 1,133.0 inhabitants per square mile (437.5/km^{2}). There were 116 housing units at an average density of 688.1 per square mile (265.7/km^{2}). The racial makeup of the city was 99.48% White, and 0.52% from two or more races. Hispanic or Latino of any race were 1.05% of the population.

There were 98 households, out of which 20.4% had children under the age of 18 living with them, 45.9% were married couples living together, 7.1% had a female householder with no husband present, and 44.9% were non-families. 41.8% of all households were made up of individuals, and 20.4% had someone living alone who was 65 years of age or older. The average household size was 1.95 and the average family size was 2.67.

In the city the population was spread out, with 18.8% under the age of 18, 10.5% from 18 to 24, 19.4% from 25 to 44, 24.6% from 45 to 64, and 26.7% who were 65 years of age or older. The median age was 46 years. For every 100 females there were 76.9 males. For every 100 females age 18 and over, there were 74.2 males.

The median income for a household in the city was $17,361, and the median income for a family was $36,250. Males had a median income of $26,500 versus $17,083 for females. The per capita income for the city was $14,642. About 16.3% of families and 19.9% of the population were below the poverty line, including 6.9% of those under the age of eighteen and 13.9% of those 65 or over.

== Education ==
It is in the West Nodaway R-I School District. The secondary school is West Nodaway High School.
