= College Springs, Iowa =

- City
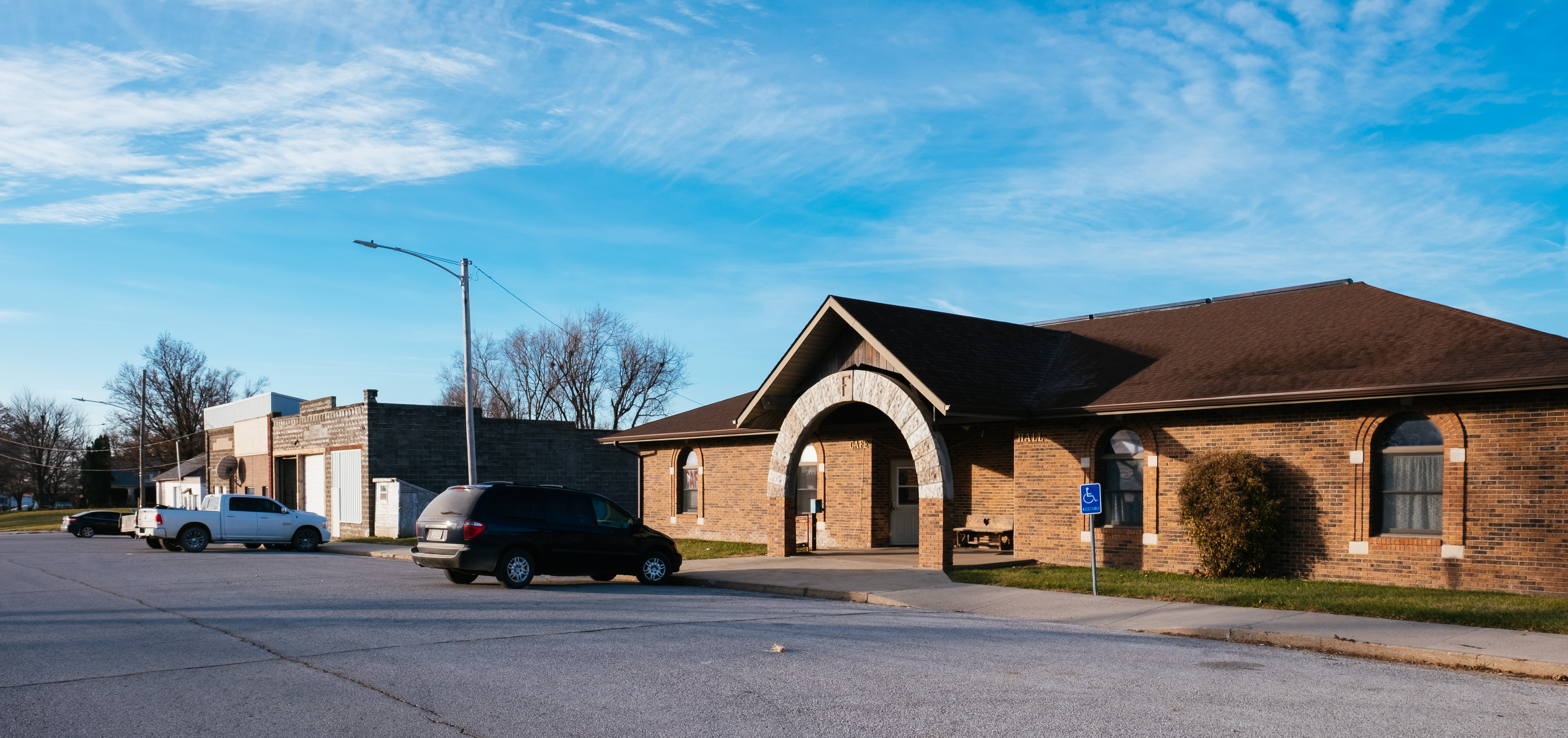
- Looking south on Missouri Ave

- Location of College Springs, Iowa
- Coordinates: 40°37′18″N 95°07′23″W
- Country: US
- State: Iowa
- County: Page

Area
  - Total: 1.12 sq mi (2.90 km^{2})
  - Land: 1.12 sq mi (2.90 km^{2})
  - Water: 0 sq mi (0.00 km^{2})
- Elevation: 1,142 ft (348 m)

Population (2020)
  - Total: 172
  - Density: 153.5/sq mi (59.26/km^{2})
- Time zone: UTC-6 (Central (CST))
  - Summer (DST): UTC-5 (CDT)
- ZIP code: 51637
- Area code: 712
- FIPS code: 19-15105
- GNIS feature ID: 2393596

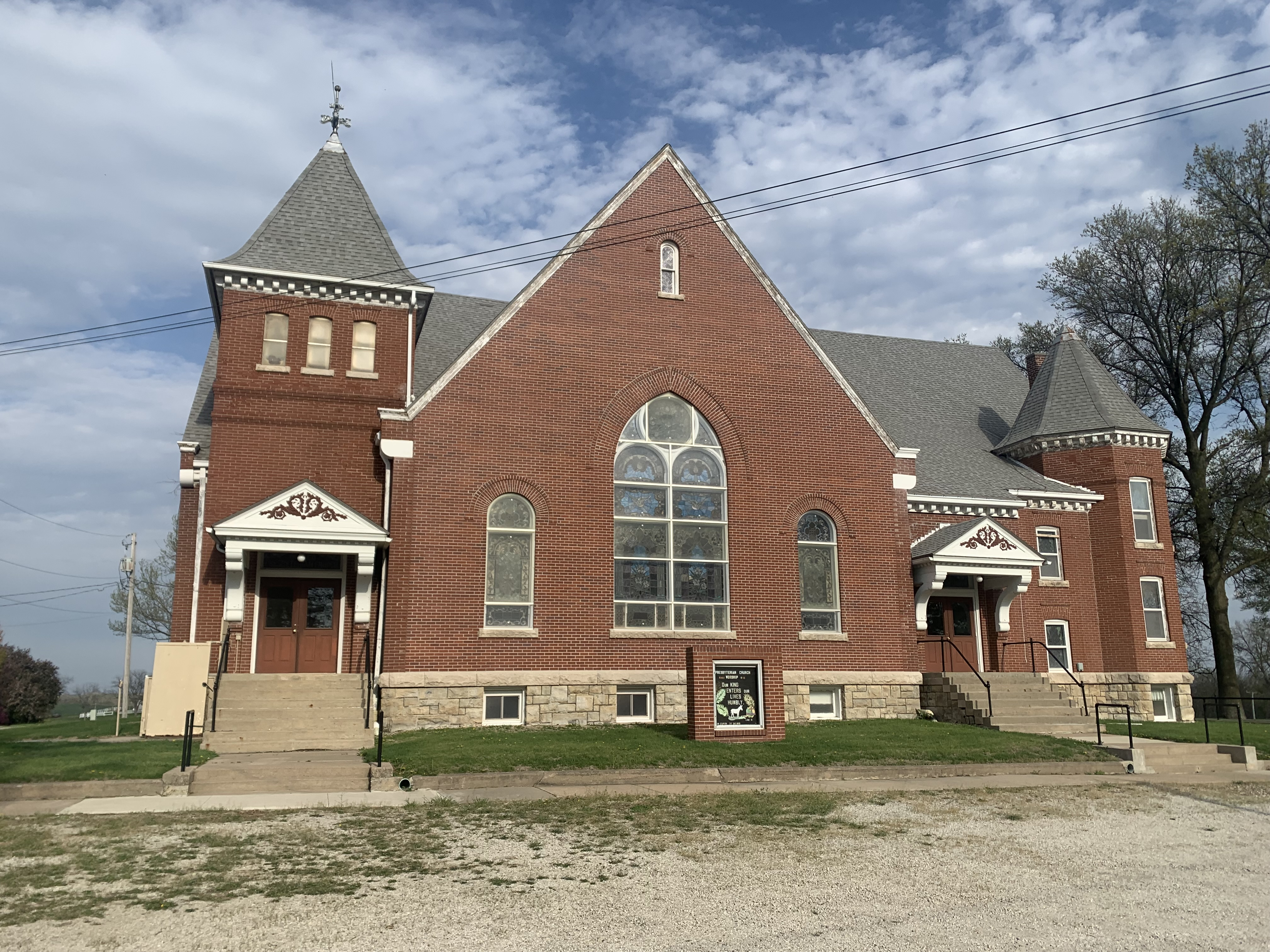
College Springs Presbyterian Church

College Springs is a city in Page County, Iowa, United States. The population was 172 at the 2020 census.

== Geography ==
According to the United States Census Bureau, the city has a total area of 1.10 square miles (2.85 km^{2}), all land.

== Demographics ==
Historical populations
Year	Pop.	±%
1880	531	—
1890	491	−7.5%
1900	693	+41.1%
1910	626	−9.7%
1920	495	−20.9%
1930	484	−2.2%
1940	430	−11.2%
1950	368	−14.4%
1960	290	−21.2%
1970	295	+1.7%
1980	307	+4.1%
1990	230	−25.1%
2000	246	+7.0%
2010	214	−13.0%
2020	172	−19.6%
Source:"U.S. Census website". United States Census Bureau. and Iowa Data Center; Source: U.S. Decennial Census

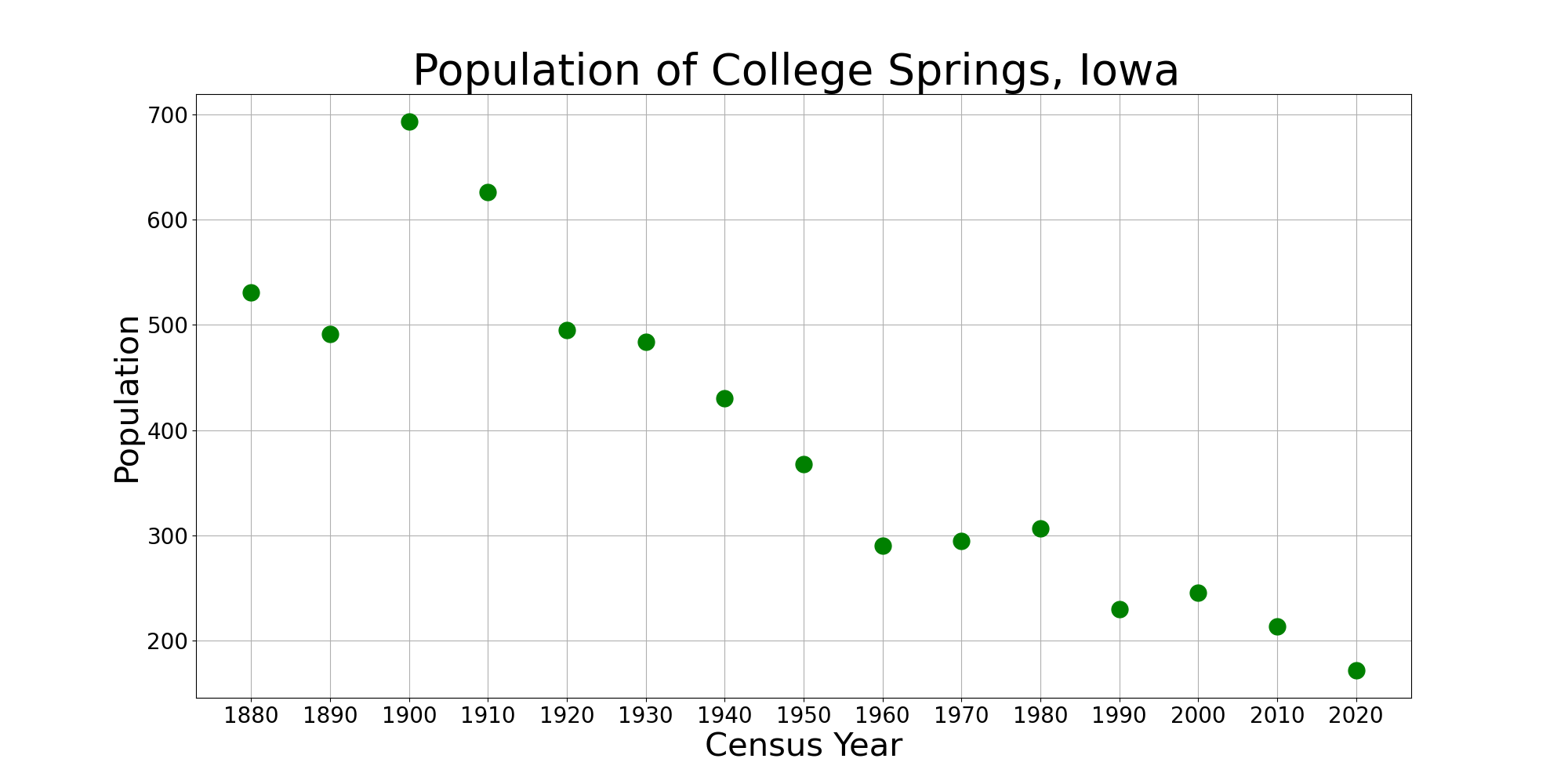
The population of College Springs, Iowa from US census data

=== 2020 census ===
As of the census of 2020, there were 172 people, 78 households, and 51 families residing in the city. The population density was 153.5 inhabitants per square mile (59.3/km^{2}). There were 80 housing units at an average density of 71.4 per square mile (27.6/km^{2}). The racial makeup of the city was 94.8% White, 0.0% Black or African American, 0.0% Native American, 0.6% Asian, 0.0% Pacific Islander, 1.2% from other races and 3.5% from two or more races. Hispanic or Latino persons of any race comprised 2.3% of the population.

Of the 78 households, 32.1% of which had children under the age of 18 living with them, 48.7% were married couples living together, 5.1% were cohabitating couples, 25.6% had a female householder with no spouse or partner present and 20.5% had a male householder with no spouse or partner present. 34.6% of all households were non-families. 26.9% of all households were made up of individuals, 17.9% had someone living alone who was 65 years old or older.

The median age in the city was 51.0 years. 25.6% of the residents were under the age of 20; 3.5% were between the ages of 20 and 24; 15.7% were from 25 and 44; 26.2% were from 45 and 64; and 29.1% were 65 years of age or older. The gender makeup of the city was 51.2% male and 48.8% female.

=== 2010 census ===
As of the census of 2010, there were 214 people, 83 households, and 60 families living in the city. The population density was 194.5 inhabitants per square mile (75.1/km^{2}). There were 90 housing units at an average density of 81.8 per square mile (31.6/km^{2}). The racial makeup of the city was 96.7% White, 0.5% Pacific Islander, and 2.8% from two or more races.

There were 83 households, of which 30.1% had children under the age of 18 living with them, 55.4% were married couples living together, 10.8% had a female householder with no husband present, 6.0% had a male householder with no wife present, and 27.7% were non-families. 21.7% of all households were made up of individuals, and 8.4% had someone living alone who was 65 years of age or older. The average household size was 2.58 and the average family size was 2.95.

The median age in the city was 40 years. 24.3% of residents were under the age of 18; 9.3% were between the ages of 18 and 24; 21.1% were from 25 to 44; 29.3% were from 45 to 64; and 15.9% were 65 years of age or older. The gender makeup of the city was 48.1% male and 51.9% female.

=== 2000 census ===
As of the census of 2000, there were 246 people, 90 households, and 72 families living in the city. The population density was 221.6 inhabitants per square mile (85.6/km^{2}). There were 95 housing units at an average density of 85.6 per square mile (33.1/km^{2}). The racial makeup of the city was 99.19% White and 0.81% Native American. Hispanic or Latino of any race were 0.41% of the population.

There were 90 households, out of which 34.4% had children under the age of 18 living with them, 70.0% were married couples living together, 6.7% had a female householder with no husband present, and 18.9% were non-families. 16.7% of all households were made up of individuals, and 7.8% had someone living alone who was 65 years of age or older. The average household size was 2.73 and the average family size was 3.07.

In the city the population was spread out, with 26.8% under the age of 18, 6.1% from 18 to 24, 23.2% from 25 to 44, 28.0% from 45 to 64, and 15.9% who were 65 years of age or older. The median age was 42 years. For every 100 females, there were 103.3 males. For every 100 females age 18 and over, there were 106.9 males.

The median income for a household in the city was $38,500, and the median income for a family was $37,750. Males had a median income of $27,375 versus $19,250 for females. The per capita income for the city was $15,102. About 2.4% of families and 4.3% of the population were below the poverty line, including 7.1% of those under the age of eighteen and none of those 65 or over.

== Education ==
South Page Community School Operates Public Schools

The school building that was Amity College now houses South Page High.

== Name ==
The city received its name because of a school called Amity College, and the "Spring" part refers to a nearby spring, reputed to have very clear water.
