= Huff Creek (Nodaway River tributary) =

Stream in northwest Missouri, U.S.

Huff Creek Huff Branch
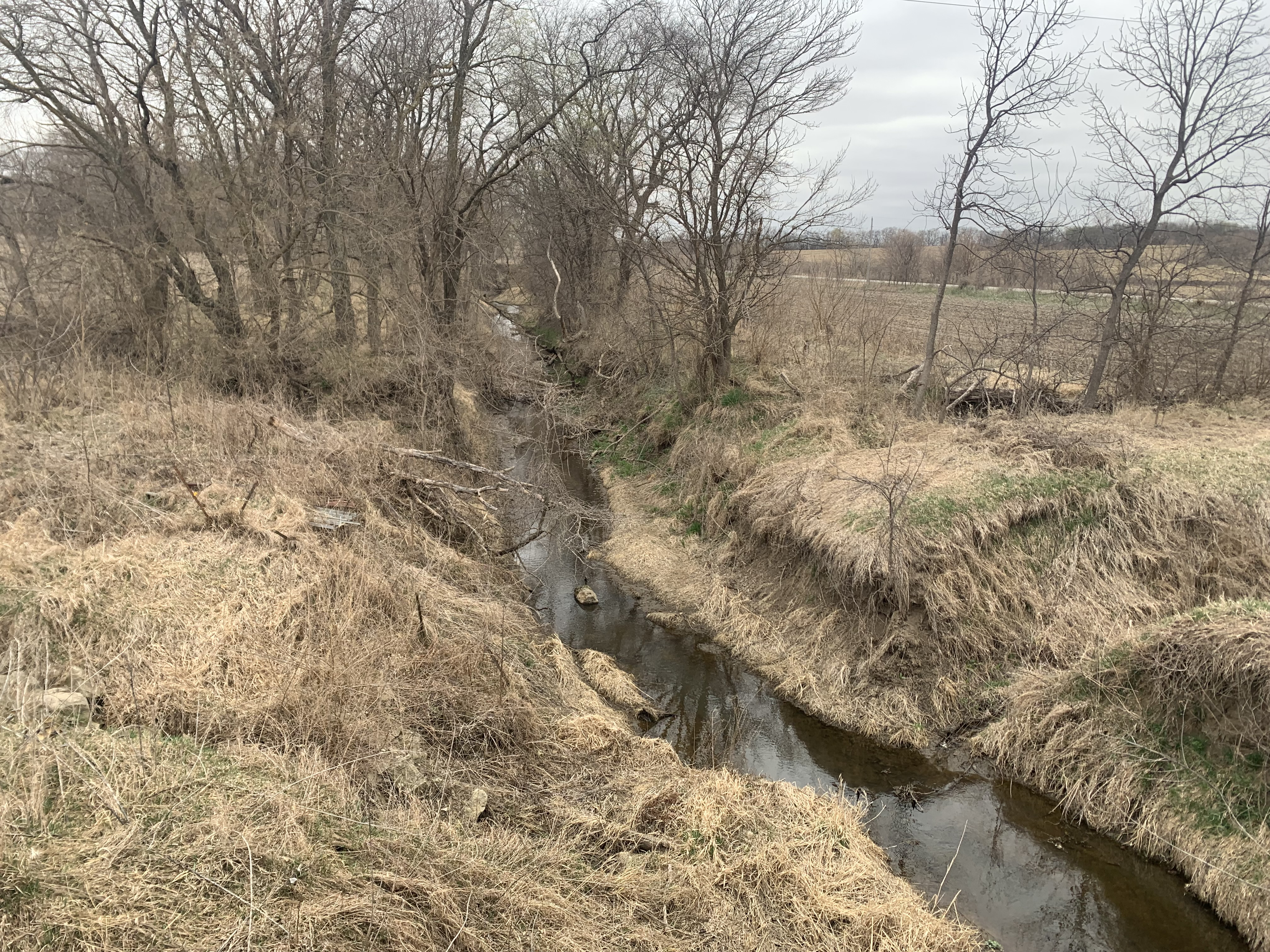
- Huff Creek on Missouri Route PP northwest of Quitman

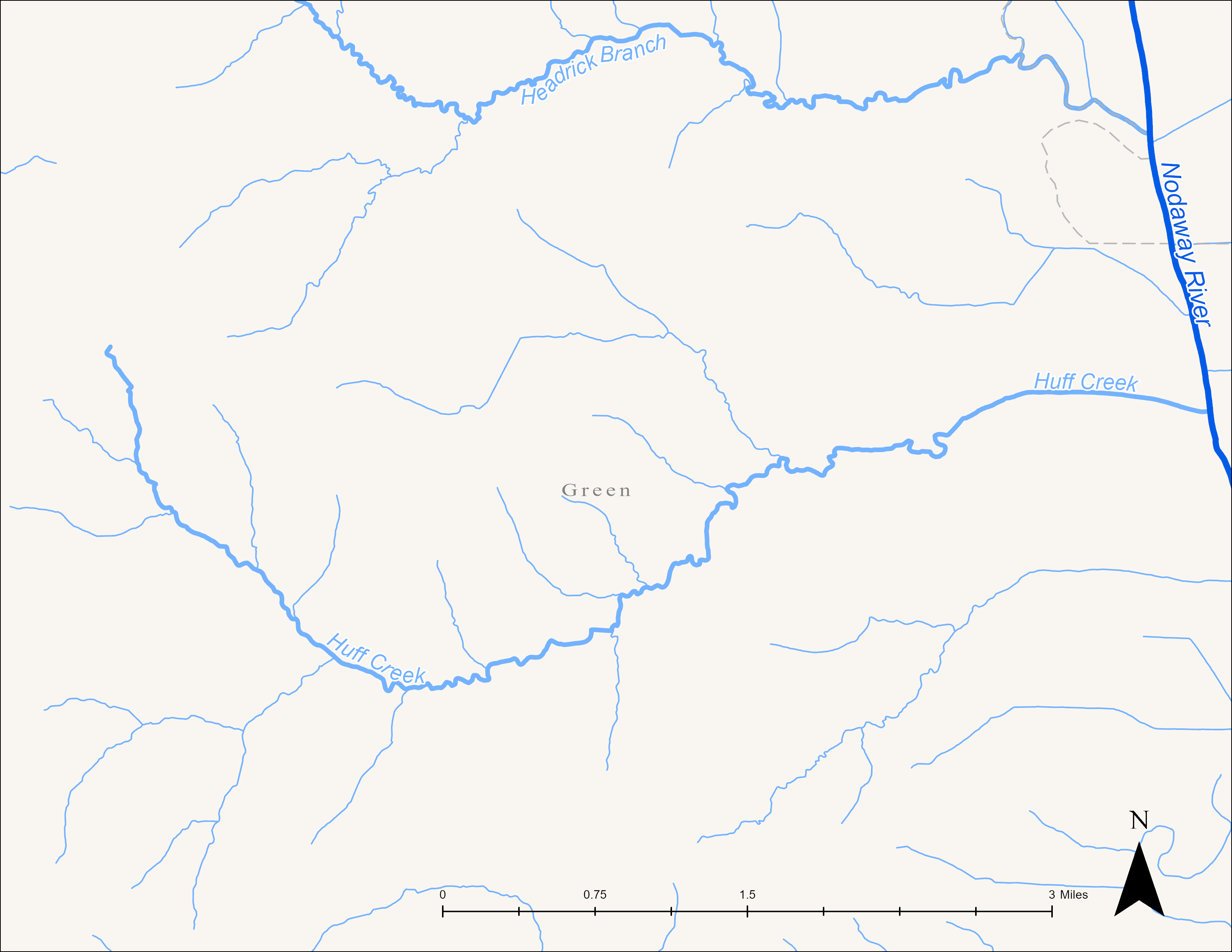
- Watershed map of Huff Creek

Location
- Country: United States
- State: Missouri
- County: Nodaway

Physical characteristics
- Source
  - location: Green Township
  - coordinates: 40°23′15″N 95°09′58″W
  - elevation: 1,100 ft (340 m)
- Mouth: Nodaway River
  - location: Green Township
  - coordinates: 40°22′54″N 95°05′17″W
  - elevation: 902 ft (275 m)
- Length: 5.9 mi (9.5 km)

Basin features
- Progression: Huff Creek → Nodaway River → Missouri River → Mississippi River → Atlantic Ocean
- Landmarks: Bilby Ranch Lake Conservation Area

Huff Creek is a stream in western Nodaway County in the U.S. state of Missouri. It is a tributary of the Nodaway River and is 5.9 miles long.

== Etymology ==
Huff Creek, historically called "Huff Branch", gets its name from Joseph Huff, a pioneer citizen.

== Geography ==
Huff Creek is a right tributary of the Nodaway River and joins it 42.5 miles before its mouth in the Missouri River. The entire stream is within Green Township. There are two named reservoirs in the Watershed: Hoover Frankum Reservoir (E-20) and Patterson Farms Lake (Sec. 12), the latter being in Bilby Ranch Lake Conservation Area.

=== Course ===
The stream headwaters about one-half mile east of the Atchison-Nodaway County line and flows easterly through the northern portion of Bilby Ranch Lake Conservation Area. It continues east-northeast until its confluence with the Nodaway River just northwest of Quitman.

=== Crossings ===
There is one highway that crosses Huff Creek at Route PP. in Green Township.

== See also ==
- Tributaries of the Nodaway River
- List of rivers of Missouri
