= Fairview, Nodaway County, Missouri =

Extinct community in Missouri, U.S.

Coordinates: 40°19′59″N 95°06′12″W

Fairview is an extinct community in Nodaway County, Missouri, in the United States. It was situated four miles southwest of Quitman. Originally, the site was known as Whig Valley, which is the name of the fertile land west of the Nodaway River. It was located just southwest of where Sand Creek deposits into the Nodaway River, and would be along Route 46 today.

Established about 1875 by John S. Bilby, Fairview was part of Bilby's several thousand acre ranch. A post office called Fairview was established, and John Bilby was appointed postmaster. The hamlet was defunct by the 20th century.
