= Green Township, Nodaway County, Missouri =

Township in Nodaway County, Missouri, U.S.

Green Township
- Township
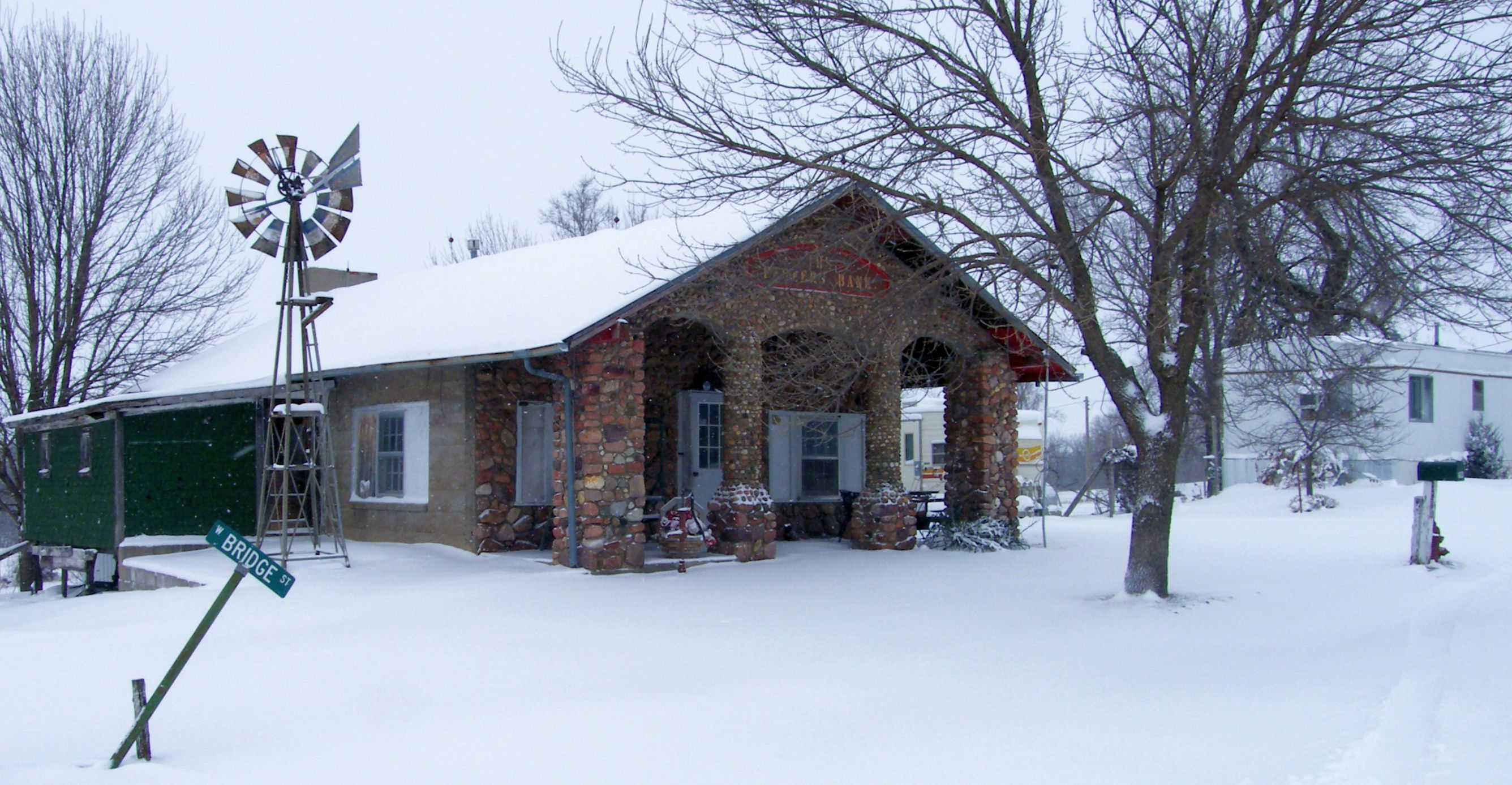
- Building in Quitman

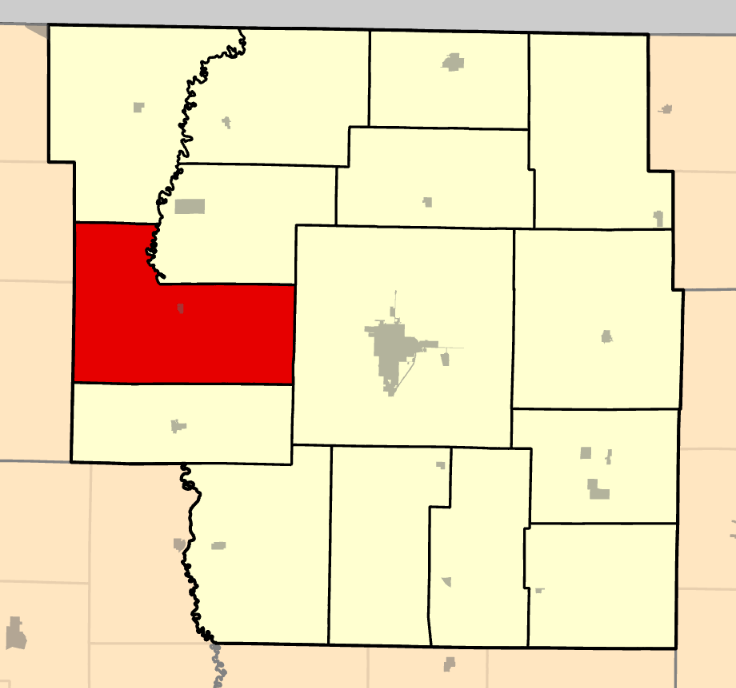
- Coordinates: 40°21′19″N 95°05′28″W
- Country: United States
- State: Missouri
- County: Nodaway
- Erected: 1866

Area
  - Total: 67.33 sq mi (174.4 km^{2})
  - Land: 67.17 sq mi (174.0 km^{2})
  - Water: 0.16 sq mi (0.41 km^{2}) 0.24%
- Elevation: 902 ft (275 m)

Population (2020)
  - Total: 246
  - Density: 3.7/sq mi (1.4/km^{2})
- FIPS code: 29-14729008
- GNIS feature ID: 767086

Green Township is a township in Nodaway County, Missouri, United States. At the 2020 census, its population was 246. It contains about 67 sections of land. The now disincorporated village of Quitman lies in its center and a small hamlet named Fairview was located four miles southwest. All of Bilby Ranch Lake Conservation Area lies in its southwest.

== History ==
Green Township was established on June 14, 1866, and was named after Nathanael Greene, an American Revolutionary War general.

== Geography ==
Bowman Branch headwaters on the northern border of this township with Nodaway Township and travels southwesterly through this township and becomes a tributary of the Nodaway River just south of Quitman.

A small settlement in the northwest of the township was called Eudora; it was located northwest of Quitman and southwest of Dawson.

== Transportation ==
The following highways travel through the township:

- U.S. Route 136
- Route 46
- Route 113
- Route AB
- Route HH
- Route PP
