= List of Missouri state forests =

This following is a list of state forests in the U.S. state of Missouri.

Name	County
Alley Spring State Forest	Shannon
Beal State Forest	Shannon
Bear Creek State Forest	Laclede
Blair Creek State Forest	Shannon
Bloom Creek State Forest	Shannon
Bluffwoods State Forest	Buchanan
Bozarth State Forest	Reynolds
Busiek State Forest	Christian
Cardareva State Forest	Shannon
Carrs Creek State Forest	Shannon
Castor River State Forest	Bollinger
Cedar Grove State Forest	Dent
Clow State Forest	Shannon
Club Creek State Forest	Bollinger
Coffin State Forest	Laclede
Coldwater State Forest	Wayne
Crooked Creek State Forest	Ray
Daniel Boone Memorial State Forest	Warren
Deer Run State Forest	Reynolds
Dickens Valley State Forest	Reynolds
Elmslie Memorial State Forest	Marion
Eva Neely Davis Memorial State Forest	Andrew
Fiery Fork State Forest	Camden
Flatwoods Church State Forest	Laclede
Fourche Creek State Forest	Ripley
Grand Trace State Forest	Harrison
Graves Mountain State Forest	Reynolds and Wayne
Hackler Ford State Forest	Dallas
Hartshorn State Forest	Shannon
Huckleberry Ridge State Forest	McDonald
Indian Creek State Forest	Shannon
Indian Trail State Forest	Dent
Lead Mine State Forest	Dallas
Lester R Davis Memorial State Forest	Barton
Little Black State Forest	Ripley
Little Lost Creek State Forest	Warren
Logan Creek State Forest	Reynolds
Lone Star Tract State Forest	Pulaski
Mule Mountain State Forest	Shannon
Osage Fork State Forest	Laclede
Paint Rock State Forest	Reynolds
Painted Rock State Forest	Osage
Poosey State Forest	Livingston
Poplar Bluff State Forest	Wayne
Powder Mill State Forest	Shannon
Reifsnider State Forest	Warren
Richard F Clement Memorial State Forest	Dent
Riverside State Forest	Reynolds
Rocky Creek State Forest	Shannon
Ruth and Paul Hennings State Forest	Taney
Shannondale State Forest	Shannon
Sugar Creek State Forest	Adair
Webb Creek State Forest	Reynolds
White River State Forest	Howell
Wilhelmina State Forest	Dunklin

== See also ==
- Mark Twain National Forest, the only national forest in Missouri
