= Busiek State Forest =

Protected area in Missouri, United States

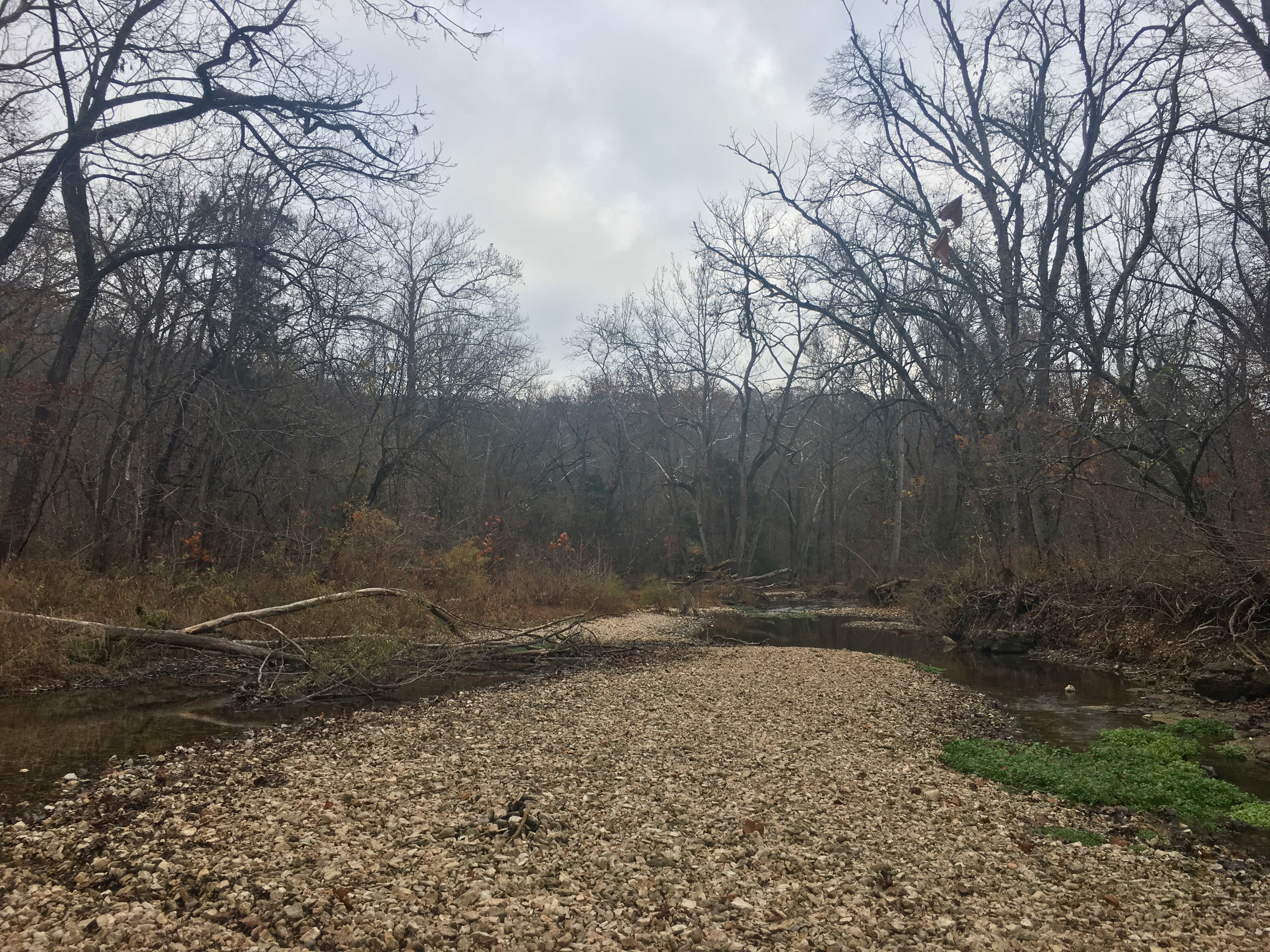
Woods Fork Stream at Busiek State Forest in late autumn.

Busiek State Forest (36°51′46″N 93°14′10″W) is a state forest and conservation area in the state of Missouri, located in Christian County near Springfield, Missouri. The area consists of forests, glades, and savannas, two streams (the intermittent Camp Creek and the permanent Woods Fork) and offers 18 miles of trails, deer, squirrel, and turkey hunting, primitive campsites, and features a shooting range.

The area is named for Urban Busiek and his wife, Erma Marie Busiek. Their son, Paul Busiek, originally sold 740 acres of the land to the Missouri Department of Conservation in 1981. Subsequent purchases would bring the area to its current size of 2700 acres.
