= List of Missouri conservation areas – Northwest region =

Map of Missouri conservation areas with the Northwest region highlighted

The Northwest administrative region of the Missouri Department of Conservation encompasses Andrew, Atchison, Buchanan, Caldwell, Carroll, Chariton, Clinton, Daviess, DeKalb, Gentry, Grundy, Harrison, Holt, Linn, Livingston, Mercer, Nodaway, Platte, Ray, and Worth counties. The regional conservation office is in St. Joseph.

Conservation area	Description	Size		County	Location
Agency Access	This is a forest area on the Platte River.	1.6 acres	0.65 ha	Buchanan	39°38′37.70″N 94°43′34.76″W
Agency Conservation Area	This is a forest area on the Platte River.	93 acres	38 ha	Buchanan	39°37′47.18″N 94°43′52.94″W
Bagley (Peter and John) Woods Conservation Area	This is an old-growth oak-hickory forest, a stand of state-endangered northern pin oaks and a small stream. Access is only by permission from adjacent landowners.	21 acres	8.5 ha	Mercer	40°34′20.07″N 93°41′14.70″W
Belcher Branch Lake Conservation Area	This tract is mostly cropland and old fields with some forest and grassland.	395 acres	160 ha	Buchanan	39°35′3.45″N 94°43′56.16″W
Bilby Ranch Lake Conservation Area	This area contains grassland, cropland, old fields, and some forest. The area provides boat ramp, fishing dock, fish cleaning station, Bilby Ranch Lake (110 acres), and many small fishing ponds.	5,089 acres	2,059 ha	Nodaway	40°21′17.29″N 95°9′4.96″W
Blue Jay Trail Access	This forest area offers access to Crooked River.	33 acres	13 ha	Ray	39°27′49.65″N 94°6′0.94″W
Bluffwoods Conservation Area	Bluffwoods and Goodell Annex overlook the Missouri River floodplain just south of St. Joseph. Both areas are mostly forested with scattered open grasslands. The Bluffwoods area has numerous service roads and several established trails for hiking.	2,247 acres	909 ha	Buchanan	39°37′44.09″N 94°56′31.70″W
Bluffwoods CA - Goodell Memorial Annex	Bluffwoods/Goodell is mostly forest.	58 acres	23 ha	Buchanan	39°39′47.52″N 94°54′45.12″W
Bonanza Conservation Area	This area contains forest, old fields, cropland, and grassland. There are four permanent streams: Brush Creek, Crabapple Creek, Log Creek, and Shoal Creek.	1,863 acres	754 ha	Caldwell	39°37′36.68″N 93°58′21.48″W
Bosworth Access	This area contains old fields and forest and offers access to the Grand River.	12 acres	4.9 ha	Carroll	39°28′24.58″N 93°15′50.50″W
Brickyard Hill Conservation Area	The area is mostly forest with significant tracts of old fields and grassland.	2,896 acres	1,172 ha	Atchison	40°28′23.75″N 95°34′22.97″W
Bridgewater Access	This area offers access to the One Hundred and Two River.	11 acres	4.5 ha	Nodaway	40°14′33.30″N 94°50′8.96″W
Bristle Ridge Access	This area offers access to the Long Branch of the Platte River.	1.4 acres	0.57 ha	Nodaway	40°10′13.98″N 94°44′52.65″W
Brown (Bob) Conservation Area	This area contains more than 1,000 acres (400 ha) of wetlands along with cropland, old fields, grassland, and forest.	3,361 acres	1,360 ha	Holt	39°57′32.52″N 95°14′6.63″W
Brown (Tom) Access	This area is primarily old fields with some timber and offers access to the Missouri River.	9 acres	3.6 ha	Andrew	39°54′11.89″N 94°58′2.70″W
Brunswick Access	The area provides boat ramp, picnic area, pavilion, and a permanent stream (Grand River).	1.8 acres	0.73 ha	Chariton	39°25′19.73″N 93°7′55.07″W
Bunch Hollow Conservation Area	This area contains more than 1,300 acres (530 ha) of forest along with old fields, grassland, savanna and cropland.	3,302 acres	1,336 ha	Carroll	39°35′11.91″N 93°35′49.37″W
Burton Bridge Access	This area is primarily old fields. It offers access to the Platte River.	18 acres	7.3 ha	Buchanan	39°34′52.65″N 94°43′2.07″W
Chloe Lowry Marsh Natural Area	This area includes 40 acres (16 ha) of freshwater marsh and 15 acres (6.1 ha) of wet-mesic prairie. Chloe Lowry Marsh is one of the highest quality natural marshes in the state containing six Missouri species of conservation concern.	113 acres	46 ha	Mercer	40°26′3.73″N 93°36′37.42″W
Christie (James D) Conservation Area	The areas contain forest, cropland, old fields, and grassland. There are fishable ponds present in the conservation area.	174 acres	70 ha	Andrew	40°3′49.08″N 94°47′56.85″W
Corning Conservation Area	This area is located in the Missouri River floodplain and contains a mix of young forest, cropland, grassland, wetlands, and idle crop fields.	1,958 acres	792 ha	Atchison, Holt	40°15′8.61″N 95°29′19.82″W
Coval Gann - Chillicothe Access	There is a boat ramp.	8 acres	3.2 ha	Livingston	39°45′12.34″N 93°33′16.44″W
Crooked River Conservation Area	This area contains old fields, forest, cropland, grassland, and wetlands.	1,411 acres	571 ha	Ray	39°24′28.81″N 94°3′24.69″W
Dalton Bottoms Access	This old-fields area provides access to the Missouri River and the Chariton River via the Missouri River.	54 acres	22 ha	Chariton	39°18′57.15″N 92°57′45.78″W
Davis (The Eva N) Memorial Conservation Area	The areas contain forest, cropland, old fields, and grassland. There are fishable ponds on Christie CA.	30 acres	12 ha	Andrew	40°4′4.98″N 94°48′9.65″W
Denton (Andy) Access	This access is a mix of forest, cropland, and old field habitat with access to the Grand River.	123 acres	50 ha	Gentry	40°5′47.04″N 94°20′54.09″W
Deroin Bend Conservation Area	This area is primarily old fields, forest, and wetlands. The area provides primitive camping, Missouri river Chute, and a permanent stream (Missouri River).	1,164 acres	471 ha	Atchison and Holt	40°16′0.28″N 95°32′29.89″W
DuPree (Arthur) Memorial Conservation Area	It is mostly forest with some old fields.	215 acres	87 ha	Buchanan	39°46′57.48″N 94°52′51.02″W
Elam Bend Conservation Area	This area is a mixture of forest, old fields, and cropland habitat. The area features a boat ramp with access to the Grand River, a shooting range, primitive camping, and a disabled accessible privy.	1,497 acres	606 ha	Gentry	40°5′2.78″N 94°15′26.07″W
Elrod Mill Access	This area is mostly forest with some cropland and old fields.	59 acres	24 ha	Andrew	40°0′0.95″N 94°41′40.56″W
Floyd (Nannie B) Memorial Conservation Area	This is a forest area.	19 acres	7.7 ha	Chariton	39°39′33.59″N 93°3′16.01″W
Fountain Grove Conservation Area	This area contains large wetlands and forest tracts in addition to cropland, grassland, and old fields. The area provides boat ramps, picnic areas, and waterfowl blinds. In addition, there are three major bodies of water: Che-Ru Lake, Bittern Marsh, and Jo Shelby Lake.	7,486 acres	3,029 ha	Linn, Livingston	39°42′7.98″N 93°17′17.05″W
Foxglove Conservation Area	This area is mostly prairie with some forest.	56 acres	23 ha	Ray	39°23′28.76″N 94°7′8.75″W
French Bottom Access (St. Joseph)	It offers access to the Missouri River. There is a boat ramp.	1.9 acres	0.77 ha	Buchanan	39°46′51.89″N 94°52′31.91″W
Gallatin Conservation Area	This area contains forest, grassland, old fields, cropland, wetlands, and savanna.	682 acres	276 ha	Daviess	39°50′38.16″N 93°55′14.05″W
Grand Trace Conservation Area	This area is a mixture of forest, old field, savanna, and grassland habitat. The area features primitive camping and two fishable ponds.	1,522 acres	616 ha	Harrison	40°19′25.74″N 94°6′23.69″W
Green Access	This area offers access to the Grand River.	5 acres	2.0 ha	Daviess	40°1′28.16″N 94°7′32.37″W
Hadorn Bridge Access	The area contains cropland with forest, old fields, and grassland.	102 acres	41 ha	Andrew	40°0′48.11″N 94°47′55.01″W
Happy Holler Lake Conservation Area	The area contains old fields, grassland, cropland, and forest.	2,286 acres	925 ha	Andrew	39°59′6.99″N 94°46′9.78″W
Hardin Conservation Area	This area is primarily forested and contains a 40-acre (16 ha) blue hole created by the flood of 1993.	242 acres	98 ha	Ray	39°15′3.76″N 93°50′31.60″W
Hartell (Ronald and Maude) Conservation Area	This area contains forest, pasture, and grassland.	113 acres	46 ha	Clinton	39°36′13.87″N 94°23′53.98″W
Helton (The Wayne) Memorial WA	This area contains old fields, forest, cropland, prairie, and two small wetlands. The area features one designated camping area (primitive) and the 30-acre (12 ha) Helton Prairie Natural Area, which features unique wildflower displays from mid-May until early July.	2,567 acres	1,039 ha	Harrison	40°14′17.82″N 93°48′17.99″W
Holmes Bend Access	This area contains forest, old fields, and grassland. It offers access to the Grand River.	83 acres	34 ha	Daviess	39°53′34.62″N 93°55′34.53″W
Honey Creek Conservation Area	The area is about one-half forest and also contains old fields, cropland and grassland.	1,437 acres	582 ha	Andrew	39°57′12.14″N 94°58′51.79″W
Hoot Owl Bend Access	The area provides primitive camping, a permanent stream (Missouri River), and no boat ramp.	7 acres	2.8 ha	Atchison	40°18′54.03″N 95°37′4.71″W
Jamesport Lake	This area contains forest, old fields, and grassland.	142 acres	57 ha	Daviess	40°0′1.93″N 93°50′29.24″W
Jentell Brees Access	The area consists primarily of old fields and grassland. It offers access to the Missouri River.	31 acres	13 ha	Buchanan	39°41′28.71″N 94°57′48.09″W
Keever Bridge Access	This area offers access to the Platte River.	7 acres	2.8 ha	Nodaway	40°25′43.05″N 94°38′5.98″W
Kendzora (Anthony and Beatrice) Conservation Area	This area provides a variety of habitats for many fish and wildlife species. The area includes 100 acres (40 ha) of cropland that is seasonally flooded, providing both upland game and waterfowl habitats. A 35-acre (14 ha) fishing lake and approximately 1-mile (1.6 km) of the Platte River runs through the west part of the area, providing river fishing opportunities.	789 acres	319 ha	Platte, Buchanan	39°31′38.10″N 94°38′54.12″W
King Lake Conservation Area	This area contains grassland, old fields, cropland, and some forest and wetlands.	1,292 acres	523 ha	DeKalb, Gentry	40°1′41.98″N 94°26′4.07″W
Kneib (Wilfrid V and Anna C) Memorial Conservation Area	This area is primarily forest with some old fields and prairies.	35 acres	14 ha	Buchanan	39°43′2.91″N 94°56′1.49″W
Lake Paho Conservation Area	This area contains old fields, forest, cropland, prairie, and grassland. The area provides boat ramps, boat dock, improved camping, hatchery, picnic areas, fishing jetty, numerous fishable ponds, and Lake Paho. Hatchery tours are available on request.	2,359 acres	955 ha	Mercer	40°24′58.49″N 93°39′43.19″W
Langdon Bend Access	This area is primarily forest.	11 acres	4.5 ha	Atchison	40°20′23.91″N 95°37′16.55″W
Lathrop Bridge Access	The area is primarily old fields and grassland.	27 acres	11 ha	Clinton	39°33′59.61″N 94°24′32.33″W
Lewis Mill Access	This area offers access to the Little Chariton River.	8 acres	3.2 ha	Chariton	39°15′26.01″N 92°51′44.34″W
Limpp Lake	This area offers a 29-acre (12 ha) lake with boat ramp and privy, forest, and old field habitat.	69 acres	28 ha	Gentry	40°3′40.25″N 94°32′4.80″W
Little Compton Lake Conservation Area	This area consists of old fields and grassland along with some forest.	344 acres	139 ha	Carroll	39°32′25.23″N 93°16′41.77″W
Little Tarkio Prairie	This area is mostly grassland with some forest and a 15-acre (6.1 ha) prairie. Primitive camping is allowed.	127 acres	51 ha	Holt	40°12′16.07″N 95°19′13.28″W
Logan (Caroline Sheridan) Memorial WA	This area is mostly forest with some old fields.	41 acres	17 ha	Buchanan	39°49′7.55″N 94°52′12.50″W
Lower Hamburg Bend Conservation Area	This area is mostly young cottonwood forest with some cropland, old fields, grasslands, and a Missouri River chute.	2,100 acres	850 ha	Atchison	40°32′45.35″N 95°45′13.98″W
Maitland Access	This area provides foot access to the Nodaway River.	0.7 acres	0.28 ha	Holt	40°12′8.35″N 95°4′11.50″W
McCormack (Jamerson C) Conservation Area	This area contains forest, grassland, old fields, and savanna.	225 acres	91 ha	Holt	40°3′5.27″N 95°14′13.61″W
McKinny Conservation Area	This area contains forest, wetlands, cropland, and old fields.	112 acres	45 ha	Carroll	39°22′14.95″N 93°14′14.71″W
Midway Access	This area offers access to the One Hundred and Two River.	1.0 acre	0.40 ha	Andrew	40°6′48.48″N 94°50′14.07″W
Mockingbird Hill Access	This area provides bank access to the Thompson River. There is no boat ramp.	84 acres	34 ha	Grundy	40°4′42.09″N 93°38′30.50″W
Monkey Mountain Conservation Area	This area has 800 acres (320 ha) of mostly forested bluffs above the Missouri River and 780 acres (320 ha) of Missouri River floodplain. This area also has stream frontage along the Missouri and Nodaway rivers.	1,624 acres	657 ha	Holt	39°55′3.71″N 95°0′24.22″W
Mussel Fork Conservation Area	This area contains cropland, old fields, grassland, and woodlands. Area includes three fishable ponds and a permanent stream (Mussel Fork Creek).	2,449 acres	991 ha	Linn, Macon	39°43′28.15″N 92°51′43.97″W
Newman Memorial Access	This area offers access to the Grand River.	9 acres	3.6 ha	Daviess	39°52′28.42″N 93°50′15.55″W
Nishnabotna Conservation Area	This area is divided into two separate tracts. The south tract is mostly forested and the north tract is a mix of cropland, idle fields and grasslands.	2,435 acres	985 ha	Atchison	40°28′19.26″N 95°40′14.54″W
Nodaway County Community Lake	This area is about 1/3 grassland and also contains old fields, forest, cropland, and savanna.	320 acres	130 ha	Nodaway	40°25′49.92″N 94°51′24.54″W
Nodaway Island Access	The access contains forest and pasture.	7 acres	2.8 ha	Andrew	39°54′10.69″N 94°57′7.78″W
Nodaway Valley Conservation Area	The area is mostly cropland with significant wetland acreage. There are smaller tracts of forest and old fields.	3,912 acres	1,583 ha	Andrew, Holt	40°4′34.26″N 95°3′29.03″W
Pawnee Prairie Natural Area	This prairie natural area is a remnant of the once-vast tallgrass prairie that covered much of northwest Missouri. Prairie restoration efforts are on-going. Several bird species of conservation concern can be seen on the area during spring and summer.	472 acres	191 ha	Harrison	40°31′19.90″N 94°8′50.98″W
Payne Landing Access	This area offers access to the Missouri River.	4 acres	1.6 ha	Holt	39°54′29.13″N 95°9′44.07″W
Pigeon Hill Conservation Area	This area is mostly forest with cropland and old fields.	460 acres	190 ha	Buchanan	39°39′47.89″N 94°46′45.95″W
Pigg's Landing Access	This grassland area offers access to the Fishing River.	17 acres	6.9 ha	Ray	39°13′15.99″N 94°9′16.36″W
Pony Express Lake Conservation Area	A public fishing and wildlife area based 25 miles east of St. Joseph, named after the Pony Express mail service that originated in St. Joseph. Includes a 240-acre lake.	3,290.1 acres	1,331.5 ha	Livingston	39°55′22.06″N 93°41′51.63″W
Poosey Conservation Area	This area contains forests, grasslands, croplands, prairie/savanna and old field habitats. Numerous upland game species are present in addition to fishing opportunities and an extensive trail system. This area has been designated an Audubon Society Important Birding Area.	5,793 acres	2,344 ha	DeKalb	39.8030016°N 94.376687°W
Possum Walk Access	This forest area offers access to the Nodaway River.	8 acres	3.2 ha	Nodaway	40°30′33.62″N 95°4′7.80″W
Punkin Center Access	This is a forest, wetlands, and old fields area along the Thompson River.	71 acres	29 ha	Livingston	39°56′20.30″N 93°37′0.22″W
Ray County Lake	This area is mostly grassland. The area provides boat ramp, picnic area, fishing jetty, and Ray County Community Lake (25 acres).	166 acres	67 ha	Ray	39°18′48.93″N 93°59′50.48″W
Riverbreaks Conservation Area	This area is more than one-half forest with grassland, old fields, cropland, and prairie. The area provides primitive camping, three fishing ponds, single projectile firearms range, and three permanent streams (Whales Creek, Schlotz Branch, and Forbes Creek).	2,276 acres	921 ha	Holt	39°56′7.05″N 95°7′53.64″W
Rochester Falls Access	The land is mainly pasture.	12 acres	4.9 ha	Andrew	39°54′33.66″N 94°41′33.68″W
Rock Quarry Access	The area is primarily old fields and pasture.	9 acres	3.6 ha	Andrew	39°53′13.60″N 94°46′48.63″W
Rush Bottoms Conservation Area	This area is mostly open land and contains a mix of cropland, idle fields, grassland, and some small tracts of forest. This area has approximately 2.5 miles (4.0 km) of Missouri River frontage and a fishing pond.	811 acres	328 ha	Holt	40°4′46.16″N 95°24′13.45″W
Savage Access	This mostly forest area offers access to the Grand River.	13 acres	5.3 ha	Daviess	40°2′58.10″N 94°12′38.33″W
Saxton Access	This area offers access to the Platte River.	7 acres	2.8 ha	Buchanan	39°43′9.69″N 94°42′15.09″W
Schifferdecker (W L) Memorial Conservation Area	This area contains old fields, cropland, two wetland units, grassland, and some forest.	235 acres	95 ha	Carroll	39°22′26.16″N 93°40′18.36″W
Seat (Emmett and Leah) Memorial Conservation Area	This area is a mixture of old field, grasslands, cropland, and woodland habitats. The area features primitive camping, an archery range, 16 fishable ponds (totalling 13 acres), and a permanent stream (Little Muddy Creek). The area is managed primarily for bobwhite quail and associated game and non-game species.	3,483 acres	1,410 ha	Worth, Gentry	40°24′8.50″N 94°14′25.43″W
Sheridan Access	This area offers access to the Platte River.	1.7 acres	0.69 ha	Worth	40°31′4.97″N 94°35′59.86″W
Sowards Ford Access	This area offers access to the East Fork of the Grand River. Primitive camping with gravel pads and picnic tables is available.	58 acres	23 ha	Worth	40°23′26.31″N 94°19′14.20″W
Star School Hill Prairie Conservation Area	This area provides a variety of habitats for a number of rare and endangered plants and animals.	292 acres	118 ha	Atchison	40°33′28.87″N 95°37′36.34″W
Sterling Price Lake	This area contains forest and grassland. This lake was renovated in 1978.	84 acres	34 ha	Chariton	39°23′59.83″N 92°50′19.04″W
Sumner Access	The area provides boat ramp, parking lot, and a permanent stream (Grand River).	3 acres	1.2 ha	Chariton	39°38′25.30″N 93°16′19.86″W
Sunbridge Hills Conservation Area	This area is mostly forest with some old fields. The area provides permanent stream (Missouri River).	200 acres	81 ha	Buchanan	39°48′40.79″N 94°52′19.36″W
Tarkio Prairie Conservation Area	This area contains a 57-acre (23 ha) natural area featuring diverse prairie flora on glacial till soil.	633 acres	256 ha	Atchison	40°30′5.06″N 95°12′54.42″W
Thurnau (H F) Conservation Area	This area is a mix of forest, old field, cropland and wetland.	1,761 acres	713 ha	Holt	40°10′26.32″N 95°26′46.49″W
VanDyke (Russell B, Hazel S and Arnold L) Conservation Area	This area is half timber and half open fields.	320 acres	130 ha	Mercer	40°24′45.87″N 93°24′15.69″W
Wabash Crossing Access	This mostly grassland area offers access to the Grand River.	12 acres	4.9 ha	Daviess	39°55′36.59″N 93°56′46.05″W
Wagner (Frank E) Conservation Area	This area contains forest, old fields, and grassland.	133 acres	54 ha	Ray	39°23′12.06″N 93°53′47.58″W
Watson Access	The area provides boat ramp and permanent stream (Nishnabotna River).	5 acres	2.0 ha	Atchison	40°29′57.04″N 95°40′37.48″W
Wolf Creek Bend Conservation Area	Wolf Creek Bend is a mix of cropland and idle cropland with some small tracts of timber along the Missouri River.	982 acres	397 ha	Holt	39°54′51.73″N 95°11′19.90″W
Worth County Lake	This area consists of a 20-acre (8.1 ha) lake with a boat ramp, privy, and 37 acres (15 ha) of old field and prairie habitat.	53 acres	21 ha	Worth	40°24′7.97″N 94°31′26.31″W
Worthwine Island Conservation Area	The area is primarily forest and old fields. The area provides primitive camping and permanent stream (Missouri River).	584 acres	236 ha	Andrew	39°51′39.74″N 94°55′57.49″W
Yellow Creek Conservation Area	This is a designated natural area consisting of lowland hardwood forest.	593 acres	240 ha	Chariton	39°34′38.95″N 93°13′16.19″W
Youngdahl (Mark) Urban Conservation Area	Three loop hiking trails, two of which are disabled-accessible asphalt surfaces, the 3rd is a gravel surface. The area consists of 80 acres (32 ha) of openland and several acres of planted trees. Two accessible picnic pavilions with picnic tables and restrooms are available.	96 acres	39 ha	Buchanan	39°45′59.13″N 94°48′38.51″W

== Notes ==
- Acreage and counties from MDCLand GIS file
- Names, descriptions, and locations from Conservation Atlas Online GIS file
