= Bowman Branch (Nodaway River tributary) =

Stream in northwest Missouri, U.S.

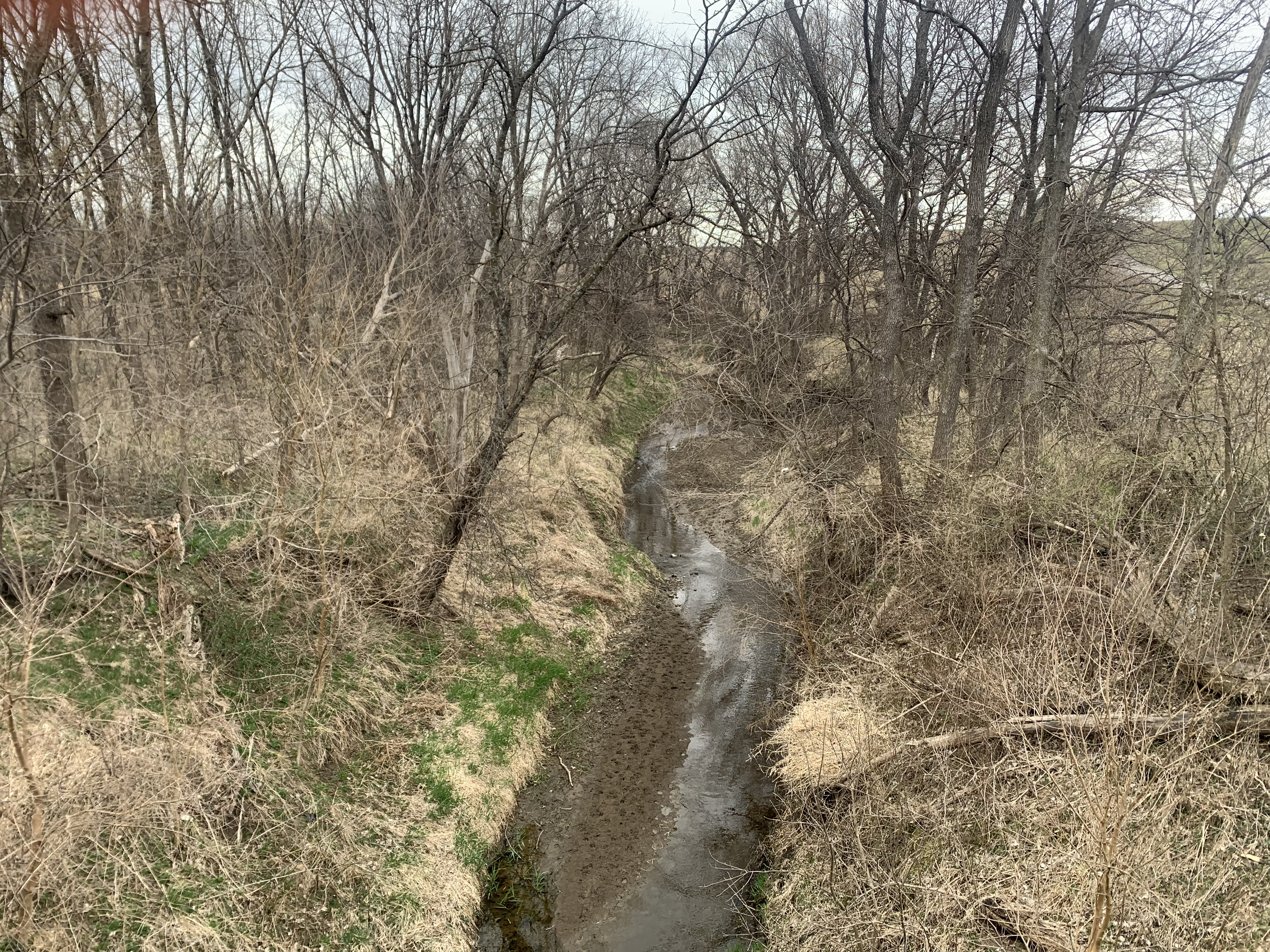
- Bowman Branch at Route 113 bridge just south of Quitman

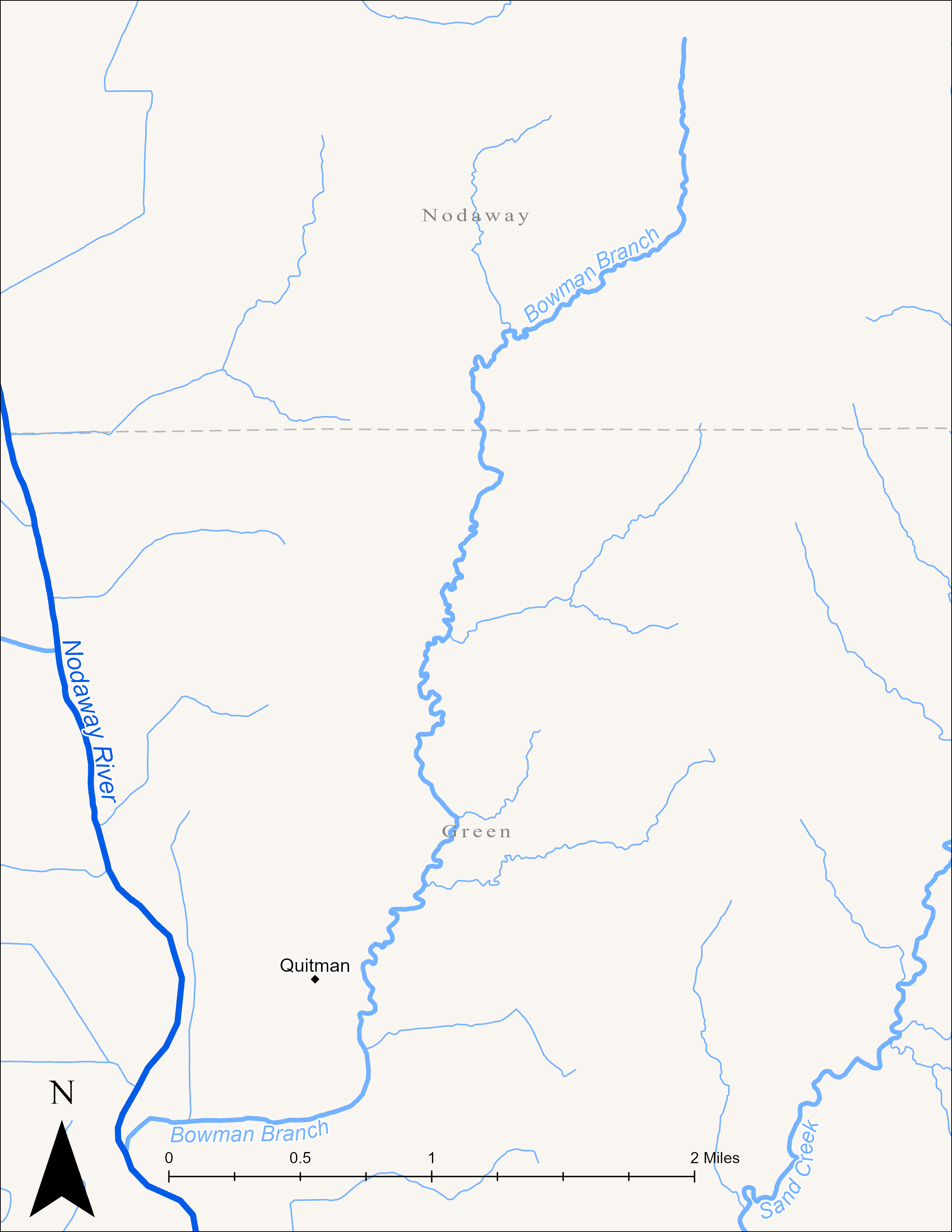
- Watershed of Bowman Branch

Location
- Country: United States
- State: Missouri
- County: Nodaway

Physical characteristics
- Source
  - location: Nodaway Township
  - coordinates: 40°18′23″N 95°09′51″W
  - elevation: 1,090 ft (330 m)
- Mouth: Nodaway River
  - location: Green Township
  - coordinates: 40°21′40″N 95°05′02″W
  - elevation: 896 ft (273 m)
- Length: 5.1 mi (8.2 km)

Basin features
- Progression: Bowman Branch → Nodaway River → Missouri River → Mississippi River → Atlantic Ocean

Bowman Branch is a stream in western Nodaway County in the U.S. state of Missouri. It is a tributary of the Nodaway River and is 5.1 miles long.

== Etymology ==
Bowman Branch has the name of William Bowman, a pioneer citizen.

== Geography ==
Bowman Branch is a left tributary of the Nodaway River and joins it 40.9 miles before its mouth in the Missouri River.

=== Course ===
The creek starts almost three miles southeast of Burlington Junction, then it progresses south towards Quitman. The stream passes east and south of Quitman before depositing into the Nodaway River approximately 1 mile southwest of the hamlet.

=== Crossings ===
There is one highway that crosses Bowman Branch at Route 113 in Green Township.

== See also ==
- Tributaries of the Nodaway River
- List of rivers of Missouri
