= List of Missouri conservation areas – Southwest region =

Map of Missouri conservation areas with the Southwest region highlighted

The Southwest administrative region of the Missouri Department of Conservation encompasses Barry, Barton, Cedar, Christian, Dade, Dallas, Greene, Hickory, Jasper, Laclede, Lawrence, McDonald, Newton, Polk, Stone, and Taney counties. The regional conservation office is in Springfield.

| Conservation Area | Description | Size | | County | Location |
|---|---|---|---|---|---|
| Adams (Anna M) Access | This is a forest area offering access to the Gasconade River. | 18 acres | 7.3 ha | Laclede | 37°37′44.25″N 92°19′34.08″W |
| Allen Bridge Access | This area offers access to Shoal Creek. There is a boat ramp. | 12 acres | 4.9 ha | Newton | 36°55′11.21″N 94°20′35.35″W |
| Ashe Juniper Natural Area | This glade contains an almost pure stand of Ashe Juniper (Ozark white cedar). | 32 acres | 13 ha | Stone | 36°35′32.43″N 93°20′29.94″W |
| Barclay Conservation Area | This area is mostly forested. It also provides a concrete boat ramp on the Niangua River. | 426 acres | 172 ha | Dallas | 37°47′28.99″N 92°52′11.62″W |
| Bear Creek Conservation Area | This is a mostly forested area. | 731 acres | 296 ha | Laclede | 37°44′1.59″N 92°32′39.27″W |
| Bennett Spring Access | This area offers access to the Niangua River. There are 2 boat ramps. | 170 acres | 69 ha | Dallas | 37°44′28.36″N 92°51′44.86″W |
| Bennett Spring Fish Hatchery | The park contains a stretch of the Niangua River and Bennett Spring Branch. Facilities include hiking trails, picnic areas, a nature center, overnight lodging, a restaurant, primitive and improved camping areas, hatchery tours, and a bait-and-tackle shop. | 708 acres | 287 ha | Laclede, Dallas | 37°43′25.94″N 92°51′31.50″W |
| Bethel Prairie Conservation Area | The area is mostly prairie. | 259 acres | 105 ha | Barton | 37°23′30.30″N 94°22′42.10″W |
| Bicentennial Conservation Area | This area is mostly forest. | 706 acres | 286 ha | Newton | 36°50′13.84″N 94°20′46.00″W |
| Big John Access | This is a forest area. Facilities/features: permanent stream (Niangua River). | 17 acres | 6.9 ha | Dallas | 37°38′35.10″N 93°2′36.26″W |
| Bluff Springs Conservation Area | This area is about 1/2 savanna and 1/2 forest with some old fields and glades. Facilities/features: primitive camping and a fishable pond (1/2 acre). | 415 acres | 168 ha | Cedar | 37°47′41.02″N 93°45′35.81″W |
| Bois D'Arc Conservation Area | Cropland, old fields, forest, grassland, and some wetlands. Facilities/features: staffed firearms range, archery range, dove blind, and numerous fishing ponds (4.5 acres total). | 3,202 acres | 1,296 ha | Greene | 37°17′10.77″N 93°30′44.62″W |
| Boston Ferry Conservation Area | Near Lake Taneycomo, this area is mostly forest with some prairie. | 172 acres | 70 ha | Taney | 36°41′27.40″N 93°11′57.61″W |
| Brush Creek Conservation Area | This is a forest area with a permanent stream (Brush Creek). | 149 acres | 60 ha | Polk | 37°48′38.92″N 93°37′25.35″W |
| Buffalo Hills Natural Area | This area is largely forest. | 494 acres | 200 ha | McDonald | 36°44′20.02″N 94°33′37.12″W |
| Buffalo Wallow Prairie Conservation Area | Facilities/features: about 400 acres (1.6 km^{2}) of native prairie, including prairie chicken habitat. The area also has forest, old fields, cropland, and 2 fishable ponds. | 1,144 acres | 463 ha | Barton | 37°37′32.91″N 94°17′48.53″W |
| Bull Shoals Lake Management Lands | This area has more than 16,000 acres (65 km^{2}) of fishable water. Permanent streams in the area include Swan Creek, Beaver Creek, Big Creek, Pond Fork, Little Norfork, and Spring Creek. The area also contains large tracts of forest and wetlands. | 37,350 acres | 15,120 ha | Taney, Ozark | 36°34′9.17″N 92°51′43.27″W |
| Bushwhacker Lake Conservation Area | This area contains prairie, forest, old fields, cropland, grassland and savanna. Facilities/features: boat ramp, primitive camping, 3 fishing jetties, fishing dock, archery range, Bushwhacker, and Willow lakes (196 acres total), and a permanent stream (Little Dry Wood Creek). | 4,774 acres | 1,932 ha | Vernon, Barton | 37°40′14.62″N 94°24′42.26″W |
| Busiek State Forest and Wildlife Area | This area is mainly forest with savannas, glades, and old fields. Facilities/features: primitive camping by Special Use Permit only, picnic areas, firearms range, intermittent stream (Camp Creek), and a permanent stream (Woods Fork). | 2,494 acres | 1,009 ha | Christian | 36°51′55.52″N 93°14′4.59″W |
| Capps Creek Conservation Area | This area contains forest, old fields, cropland, and some wetlands. Facilities/features: 2 permanent streams (Capps Creek, Shoal Creek). | 707 acres | 286 ha | Newton | 36°53′21.00″N 94°5′7.57″W |
| Carl Junction Access | This area offers access to Center Creek. There is a boat ramp. | 4 acres | 1.6 ha | Jasper | 37°9′37.05″N 94°34′50.47″W |
| Charity Access | Facilities/features: boat ramp, fishable pond (1/4 acre), and a permanent stream (Niangua River). | 145 acres | 59 ha | Dallas | 37°31′14.78″N 92°59′4.77″W |
| Cherry Corner Access | This area offers access to Shoal Creek. | 6 acres | 2.4 ha | Newton | 36°55′47.32″N 94°18′39.84″W |
| Chesapeake Fish Hatchery | The hatchery raises a variety of warm-water species, including channel catfish, grass carp, largemouth bass, walleye, bluegill, hybrid sunfish, and fathead minnows. Tours are available. | 120 acres | 49 ha | Lawrence | 37°7′10.43″N 93°40′42.48″W |
| Clear Creek Conservation Area | This area is mostly prairie with more than 200 acres (0.81 km^{2}) of woodlands. Facilities/features: 5 fishable ponds (5.2 acres total) and an intermittent stream (Clear Creek). This area has excellent deer and turkey hunting opportunities. | 979 acres | 396 ha | Vernon, Barton | 37°38′42.88″N 94°14′5.62″W |
| Coffin Cave Conservation Area | Cave entrance closed to public for safety reasons. | 73 acres | 30 ha | Laclede | 37°46′51.11″N 92°51′10.96″W |
| Coleman Memorial Conservation Area | From I-44 south of Lebanon, take exit 127, then south on Morgan Rd, then Evergreen Pky east off the traffic circle, then .60-mile (97 km) to the area. | 65 acres | 26 ha | Laclede | 37°38′57.72″N 92°39′47.15″W |
| Compton Hollow Conservation Area | This is a mostly forest area. Facilities/features: archery range. | 837 acres | 339 ha | Webster | 37°13′51.18″N 93°0′4.97″W |
| Comstock Prairie Conservation Area | This area is mostly prairie. Facilities/features: 2 fishable ponds (1.8 acres total) and a permanent stream (Comstock Creek). | 313 acres | 127 ha | Barton | 37°38′33.32″N 94°29′49.43″W |
| Cooper Creek Access | Facilities/features: boat ramp, boat dock, fishing dock, and Lake Taneycomo (2,080 acres). | 49 acres | 20 ha | Taney | 36°37′16.26″N 93°14′51.83″W |
| Cowskin Access | This is a forest area with a boat ramp on the Elk River. | 44 acres | 18 ha | McDonald | 36°38′4.52″N 94°35′9.85″W |
| Cox (Ralph) Memorial Access | This area offers access to the James River. There is a boat ramp. | 11 acres | 4.5 ha | Stone | 36°48′23.66″N 93°27′40.70″W |
| Crighton (Joe) Access | Facilities/features: boat ramp, picnic area, and a permanent stream (James River). | 8 acres | 3.2 ha | Greene | 37°9′13.82″N 93°12′2.14″W |
| Cross Timbers Access | This forest and old fields area offers access to the Pomme de Terre River. There is a boat ramp. | 48 acres | 19 ha | Hickory | 37°58′53.74″N 93°18′50.19″W |
| Davis (The Lester R) Memorial Forest | This is an 85-acre (340,000 m^{2}) forest with 5 acres (20,000 m^{2}) of strip pits. The area was mined land that was planted with trees by Lester Davis, the previous owner. There are over 50 species of native and non-native trees and shrubs. | 79 acres | 32 ha | Barton | 37°30′7.72″N 94°34′25.52″W |
| Davis Ford Access | This area offers access to the Osage Fork River. | 17 acres | 6.9 ha | Laclede | 37°39′29.19″N 92°29′20.29″W |
| Deep Ford Access | This area includes old fields and forest. It offers access to Big Sugar Creek. | 42 acres | 17 ha | McDonald | 36°36′54.18″N 94°21′4.01″W |
| Delaware Town Access | This area is mostly old fields planted in trees. Facilities/features: boat ramp and a permanent stream (James River). | 20 acres | 8.1 ha | Christian | 37°3′1.91″N 93°23′24.93″W |
| Diamond Grove Prairie Conservation Area | This area is predominantly prairie. | 861 acres | 348 ha | Newton | 37°0′55.82″N 94°22′8.89″W |
| Dorris Creek Prairie Conservation Area | This area is mostly native prairie with 3 fishable ponds (12 acres total). | 158 acres | 64 ha | Barton | 37°23′5.74″N 94°13′50.87″W |
| Drury-Mincy Conservation Area | This area, which borders Bull Shoals Reservoir, contains 3,400 acres (14 km^{2}) of forest. | 6,304 acres | 2,551 ha | Taney | 36°32′28.81″N 93°4′16.32″W |
| Drynob Access | Access to the Osage Fork River within a special management area for smallmouth and goggle-eye. | 16 acres | 6.5 ha | Laclede | 37°38′1.09″N 92°27′2.93″W |
| Drywood Conservation Area | This area is 1/2 old fields with some forest and cropland. Includes a small lake (2.5 acres), and an intermittent stream. | 98 acres | 40 ha | Barton | 37°37′10.38″N 94°33′0.14″W |
| Fiddlers Ford Access | This area has access to Turnback Creek. | 52 acres | 21 ha | Dade | 37°23′1.46″N 93°48′16.86″W |
| Flag Spring Conservation Area | This area is mainly forestland. Facilities/features: primitive camping, firearms range, 13 fishless ponds, and Flag Spring. | 3,988 acres | 1,614 ha | Barry, McDonald | 36°37′3.05″N 94°2′54.65″W |
| Fort Crowder Conservation Area | Forest, grassland, and old fields. Facilities/features: picnic areas, shooting range, and an archery range. | 2,323 acres | 940 ha | Newton | 36°49′6.09″N 94°19′29.06″W |
| Goodman Towersite | Goodman Towersite is south of Neosho on Highway 59, then west on Sorrel Road for 3/4-mile. | 38 acres | 15 ha | Newton | 36°46′19.46″N 94°25′4.52″W |
| Goose Creek Conservation Area | This is a predominantly forest area. | 881 acres | 357 ha | Laclede, Dallas | 37°33′12.68″N 92°51′5.87″W |
| Hayes Spring Conservation Area | This area contains Hayes Spring Cave and Hayes Spring. There is a short hiking trail. | 104 acres | 42 ha | Stone | 36°55′15.02″N 93°26′27.98″W |
| Henning (Ruth and Paul) Conservation Area | This area is mostly forest. Facilities/features: hiking trails, White River Balds Natural Area, and a permanent stream (Roark Creek). | 1,536 acres | 622 ha | Taney, Stone | 36°40′7.21″N 93°17′42.35″W |
| Hermitage Access | This area offers access to the Pomme de Terre River. There is a boat ramp. | 3 acres | 1.2 ha | Hickory | 37°56′12.79″N 93°18′55.65″W |
| Holland State Forest | This area is all forest. | 160 acres | 65 ha | Stone | 36°53′50.97″N 93°22′2.00″W |
| Hollister Towersite | This is a mostly forest area. | 200 acres | 81 ha | Taney | 36°33′46.67″N 93°15′19.98″W |
| Hooten Town Access | This area offers access to the James River. There is a boat ramp. | 5 acres | 2.0 ha | Stone | 36°56′24.72″N 93°23′10.89″W |
| Horse Creek Prairie Conservation Area | This is a native prairie area. | 77 acres | 31 ha | Dade | 37°24′24.06″N 93°59′33.85″W |
| Huckleberry Ridge Conservation Area | This is a forest area with several small ponds. | 2,065 acres | 836 ha | McDonald | 36°35′46.53″N 94°19′8.43″W |
| Hull Ford Access | This area offers access to the Osage Fork River. | 11 acres | 4.5 ha | Laclede | 37°42′9.48″N 92°29′7.64″W |
| Indigo Prairie Conservation Area | This is a native prairie area. | 41 acres | 17 ha | Dade | 37°22′21.93″N 93°54′16.86″W |
| Jessie Hollow Conservation Area | This is a forest area. | 117 acres | 47 ha | Stone | 36°45′56.09″N 93°28′18.77″W |
| Kerr (H L) Access | This area offers access to the James River. There is a boat ramp. | 50 acres | 20 ha | Stone | 36°49′50.63″N 93°27′18.18″W |
| Kickapoo Prairie Conservation Area | This is a native prairie area. | 157 acres | 64 ha | Lawrence | 37°13′23.71″N 93°57′32.27″W |
| La Petite Gemme Prairie Conservation Area | This is a Designated Natural Area. | 40 acres | 16 ha | Polk | 37°33′45.70″N 93°24′40.51″W |
| Lanagan Towersite | This is a forest area. | 54 acres | 22 ha | McDonald | 36°36′30.88″N 94°28′12.40″W |
| Lead Mine Conservation Area | This forested area contains savanna, glades, and old fields. Facilities and features include boat ramps, an unmanned firearms range, fishable ponds, several intermittent streams, and 2 permanent streams (Niangua River, Jakes Creek). | 7,031 acres | 2,845 ha | Dallas | 37°50′57.71″N 92°54′2.63″W |
| Little Sac Woods Conservation Area | This area is mostly forest. Facilities/features: primitive camping and a permanent stream (Little Sac River). | 771 acres | 312 ha | Greene | 37°23′26.96″N 93°23′23.16″W |
| Long Ford Access | This area offers a gravel boat launch on the Gasconade River. | 40 acres | 16 ha | Laclede | 37°35′14.98″N 92°30′52.43″W |
| Lower Flat Creek Access | This area consists of gravel bar and lawn along Flat Creek. There is no boat ramp. | 4 acres | 1.6 ha | Barry | 36°45′4.14″N 93°37′2.08″W |
| Mo-No-I Prairie Conservation Area | This entire area is native prairie. During May and June the area has many showy native wildflowers in bloom. | 302 acres | 122 ha | Barton | 37°32′59.04″N 94°22′31.91″W |
| Mon-Shon Prairie Conservation Area | This is a native prairie area with a small shrubby drainage. | 80 acres | 32 ha | Barton | 37°22′1.88″N 94°36′53.30″W |
| Monegaw Prairie Conservation Area | This is a prairie area. | 267 acres | 108 ha | Cedar | 37°51′13.58″N 93°57′41.17″W |
| Moon Valley Access | This area offers access to the Niangua River. There is a boat ramp. | 4 acres | 1.6 ha | Dallas | 37°42′11.74″N 92°52′57.17″W |
| Mount Shira Access | This old fields area offers access to the Elk River. | 31 acres | 13 ha | McDonald | 36°34′35.92″N 94°27′49.92″W |
| Mount Vernon Prairie | This is a Designated Natural Area featuring dry-mesic sandstone and shale prairie. | 40 acres | 16 ha | Lawrence | 37°8′18.55″N 93°47′18.47″W |
| Mule Shoe Conservation Area | This tract is mostly forest. Facilities/features: primitive camping and 3 permanent streams. | 2,477 acres | 1,002 ha | Hickory | 38°0′4.47″N 93°5′39.33″W |
| Murphy (John F) Memorial State Forest and Wildlife Area | This area is mostly forest. Facilities/features: primitive camping. | 325 acres | 132 ha | Hickory | 37°57′6.89″N 93°23′4.68″W |
| Neosho Towersite | This area is mostly forest. | 80 acres | 32 ha | Newton | 36°54′8.84″N 94°19′9.64″W |
| Niangua Conservation Area | This area is mostly forest. | 819 acres | 331 ha | Webster | 37°25′2.54″N 92°52′46.23″W |
| Niawathe Prairie Conservation Area | This is a 320-acre (1.3 km^{2}) Designated Natural Area. | 315 acres | 127 ha | Dade | 37°30′49.23″N 93°58′18.01″W |
| Osage Fork Conservation Area | This is a forest area with an archery range. | 281 acres | 114 ha | Laclede | 37°34′42.69″N 92°40′27.76″W |
| Pa Sole Prairie Conservation Area | The area has native prairie, cropland, grassland, and old fields. There are 2 ponds (totaling 1.5 acres), but the north pond is not fishable. | 238 acres | 96 ha | Barton | 37°25′6.62″N 94°12′7.50″W |
| Paris Springs Access | This area contains forest, cropland, old fields, and grassland. Facilities/features: 3 small ponds, permanent stream (Turnback Creek). | 209 acres | 85 ha | Lawrence | 37°11′33.59″N 93°41′39.32″W |
| Pawhuska Prairie | This prairie is a Designated Natural Area. | 74 acres | 30 ha | Barton | 37°32′14.84″N 94°9′39.07″W |
| Phenix Access | This is a forest with old fields offering access to Clear Creek. | 149 acres | 60 ha | Greene | 37°21′49.84″N 93°34′28.02″W |
| Pilot Knob Conservation Area | This is a predominantly forest area. | 1,350 acres | 550 ha | Stone | 36°32′26.68″N 93°33′20.34″W |
| Pleasant Hope Conservation Area | This area is mostly forest. It has several small ponds, hiking trails, and an intermittent stream (Bear Creek). | 1,110 acres | 450 ha | Polk | 37°26′3.80″N 93°18′5.49″W |
| Pomme De Terre Lake Management Lands | The Missouri Department of Conservation manages the fishery in Pomme de Terre Lake in cooperation with the US Army Corps of Engineers. See regulations. Bank fishing access is available on management lands at various locations around the lake. | 5,132 acres | 2,077 ha | Polk, Hickory | 37°48′19.89″N 93°21′13.34″W |
| Powell Towersite | This is a forest area. | 80 acres | 32 ha | McDonald | 36°32′40.87″N 94°11′25.06″W |
| Prosperine Access | This forest area offers access to the Niangua River. | 7 acres | 2.8 ha | Laclede | 37°47′57.13″N 92°50′11.60″W |
| Providence Prairie Conservation Area | This area is mostly prairie with some cropland. | 190 acres | 77 ha | Lawrence | 37°16′7.21″N 93°59′8.39″W |
| Rader Access | This area contains grassland, old fields, forest, and offers access to the Osage Fork of the Gasconade River. | 66 acres | 27 ha | Webster | 37°27′34.16″N 92°43′44.15″W |
| Redwing Prairie Conservation Area | The area is mostly prairie with a small fishing pond. | 166 acres | 67 ha | Barton | 37°33′4.31″N 94°25′36.04″W |
| Risch (Edward B and Marie O) Conservation Area | The area is mostly prairie with some cropland and a wooded intermittent stream that traverses the area. | 173 acres | 70 ha | Barton | 37°38′11.63″N 94°12′29.01″W |
| Roaring River Conservation Area | The area is mostly forest with some old fields and grassland. Facilities/features: primitive camping and a permanent stream (Roaring River). | 434 acres | 176 ha | Barry | 36°34′29.06″N 93°49′41.14″W |
| Roaring River Fish Hatchery | The hatchery grounds are located at the source of Roaring River. A 7.5-mile (12.1 km) stretch of Roaring River and associated park lands are managed cooperatively with Missouri Department of Natural Resources to provide a trout fishery. Natural features include Roaring River Spring. | 3 acres | 1.2 ha | Barry | 36°35′32.70″N 93°49′59.06″W |
| Rocky Barrens Conservation Area | This area contains forest, glades, and old fields. | 275 acres | 111 ha | Greene | 37°18′53.70″N 93°23′47.63″W |
| Sare (Dale) Conservation Area | This area consists of upland oak-hickory forest. Hiking trails and primitive camping are available. | 316 acres | 128 ha | Greene | 37°22′5.55″N 93°19′33.07″W |
| Sentinel Conservation Area | This area contains savanna and glades. | 160 acres | 65 ha | Polk | 37°47′13.50″N 93°20′24.14″W |
| Shawnee Trail Conservation Area | This area is mostly cropland and grassland with some native prairie plus wetlands, old fields, and pasture. Facilities/features: boat ramp, fishing dock, 3 fishing jetties, and 11 fishable lakes and ponds (40 acres total). | 3,683 acres | 1,490 ha | Barton | 37°26′37.87″N 94°34′45.52″W |
| Shelvin Rock Access | This area provides access to the James River. There is a boat ramp. | 20 acres | 8.1 ha | Christian | 36°59′43.00″N 93°22′0.63″W |
| Shepherd of the Hills Conservation Education Center | Facilities/features: boat ramp (onto Lake Taneycomo), picnic areas and a pavilion, hiking trails, 2 viewing blinds, 2 viewing decks, nature center, hatchery tours, and exhibits. | 159 acres | 64 ha | Taney | 36°35′55.25″N 93°18′5.01″W |
| Sky Prairie Conservation Area | This area is mostly prairie with some forest. | 203 acres | 82 ha | Cedar | 37°41′30.03″N 93°57′4.85″W |
| Sloan (Dr O E and Eloise) Conservation Area | Grassland, old fields, cropland, and some prairie. There are 2 fishable ponds (1.5 acres total). | 314 acres | 127 ha | Dade | 37°23′39.31″N 93°53′46.98″W |
| Smack-Out Access | This area offers access to Shoal Creek. | 1.7 acres | 0.69 ha | Newton | 36°54′59.12″N 94°7′58.83″W |
| Springfield Conservation Nature Center | Outside – explore 80 acres (320,000 m^{2}) of habitat including forest | 72 acres | 29 ha | Greene | 37°7′31.40″N 93°14′28.04″W |
| Stockton Lake Management Lands | This area offers hunting, bank fishing, bird watching, and mushroom hunting. There is a bird viewing blind in the Aldrich Refuge, and a multi-use trail in the south part of the area. | 16,572 acres | 6,706 ha | Polk, Dade, Cedar | 37°30′17.85″N 93°43′39.79″W |
| Stones Corner Access | This area offers access to Center Creek. There is a boat ramp. | 10 acres | 4.0 ha | Jasper | 37°10′2.59″N 94°30′44.11″W |
| Stony Point Prairie Conservation Area | This 960-acre (3.9 km^{2}) area is nearly all native prairie and has a 1/2 acre fishable pond. | 980 acres | 400 ha | Dade | 37°31′40.48″N 94°1′20.22″W |
| Stubblefield Access | The area is mostly forest. Facilities/features: Gravel boat ramp and permanent stream (Flat Creek). | 49 acres | 20 ha | Barry | 36°47′18.25″N 93°43′16.98″W |
| Sunset Park Access | This area offers access to the Pomme de Terre River. There is a boat ramp. | 19 acres | 7.7 ha | Polk | 37°33′21.01″N 93°18′24.52″W |
| Talbot (Robert E) Conservation Area | This area contains old fields, grassland, cropland, woodlands, savanna, prairie, and wetlands. Facilities/features: a fishing jetty, fishable lakes and a permanent stream (Spring River). | 4,350 acres | 1,760 ha | Lawrence | 37°9′12.08″N 93°55′11.14″W |
| Tipton Ford Access | This area offers access to Shoal Creek. | 88 acres | 36 ha | Newton | 36°58′48.51″N 94°26′20.07″W |
| Treaty Line Prairie Conservation Area | This is a prairie area. | 167 acres | 68 ha | Barton | 37°27′52.96″N 94°12′35.97″W |
| Truman Reservoir Management Lands (Cross Timbers) | This area offers fishing on Truman Lake, hunting, hiking, and bird watching opportunities. | 4,781 acres | 1,935 ha | Hickory | 38°0′40.89″N 93°18′58.03″W |
| Turkey Creek Conservation Area | This is a forest area. | 158 acres | 64 ha | Cedar | 37°46′57.91″N 93°40′48.87″W |
| Twenty-Five Mile Prairie Conservation Area | This is a native prairie area. | 340 acres | 140 ha | Polk | 37°46′29.64″N 93°31′37.85″W |
| Wah-Kon-Tah Prairie | This is a prairie area with 2 small, fishable ponds. | 3,067 acres | 1,241 ha | Cedar, St. Clair | 37°54′9.89″N 94°0′9.51″W |
| Wah-Sha-She Prairie | This is a native prairie area with a small wetland. This is a designated Natural Area. Native grasses and wildflowers are very diverse and abundant. | 154 acres | 62 ha | Jasper | 37°18′31.39″N 94°35′55.90″W |
| Wildcat Access | This area offers access to Shoal Creek. There is a boat ramp. | 0.8 acres | 0.32 ha | Newton | 37°1′47.34″N 94°31′14.49″W |
| Wildcat Glade Natural Area | Wildcat Glade Natural Area is an excellent example of chert glades. | 16.6 acres | 6.7 ha | Newton | 37°1′25.45″N 94°31′23.52″W |
| Williams Ford Access | This area offers access to the Niangua River. | 37 acres | 15 ha | Dallas | 37°41′27.19″N 92°57′15.19″W |
| Wire Road Conservation Area | This area is about half forest with old fields, pasture and some grassland. Facilities/features: permanent stream (Crane Creek). | 805 acres | 326 ha | Stone | 36°54′16.35″N 93°34′4.13″W |

== Notes ==
- Acreage and counties from MDCLand GIS file
- Names, descriptions, and locations from Conservation Atlas Online GIS file
