= Bluffwoods Conservation Area =

Protected land in Missouri, U.S.

- Location within Missouri
- Location: Buchanan County, Missouri, United States
- Nearest city: St. Joseph
- Coordinates: 39°37′12″N 94°51′45″W
- Area: 2,343 acres (948 ha)
- Established: 1975
- Governing body: Missouri Department of Conservation
- Website: Official website

Bluffwoods Conservation Area is a public nature preserve located in the Loess Hills of southwestern Buchanan County, approximately 9 miles south of St. Joseph. Managed by the Missouri Department of Conservation (MDC), the 2,343-acre (948.5 ha) area was acquired in the mid-1970s to protect one of the last remaining tracts of oak-hickory forest in northwest Missouri and to provide diverse outdoor recreation opportunities.

== Description ==
Bluffwoods is situated in the Missouri River loess hills, a unique geological formation characterized by wind-deposited silt and steep bluffs. The area features a mix of mature hardwood forest, old fields, native grass openings, and dry hill prairies. Dominant tree species include northern red oak, chinkapin oak, sugar maple, basswood, and black walnut. The understory supports a variety of woodland flora, including pawpaw, showy orchids, and the rare Adam and Eve orchid.

The conservation area is part of the Iatan/Weston Missouri River Corridor Conservation Opportunity Area, a regional initiative to protect high-quality forests and wetlands for migratory birds and species of conservation concern.

== Recreation and Facilities ==
Bluffwoods offers a variety of recreational amenities. The Forest Nature Trail is a paved, ADA-accessible loop that winds through forest and openland habitats. Additional trails, including the Maple Falls and Lone Pine loops, provide access to scenic overlooks, wet-weather springs, and a seasonal waterfall. The Kerlin Creek Picnic Area features picnic tables, fire rings, and a disabled-accessible privy.

Hiking, birdwatching, and nature photography are popular activities. The area has been designated an Important Bird Area (IBA) by Audubon Missouri due to its significance for neotropical migratory songbirds and declining woodland species.

== Wildlife ==
Over 100 species of woodland wildlife inhabit Bluffwoods, including white-tailed deer, wild turkey, gray squirrels, red fox, and raccoons. Bird species such as wood thrush, scarlet tanager, and cerulean warbler are commonly observed during migration seasons.

== See also ==
- List of Missouri conservation areas – Northwest region
- Loess Hills
