= John S. Bilby =

American rancher (1832–1919)

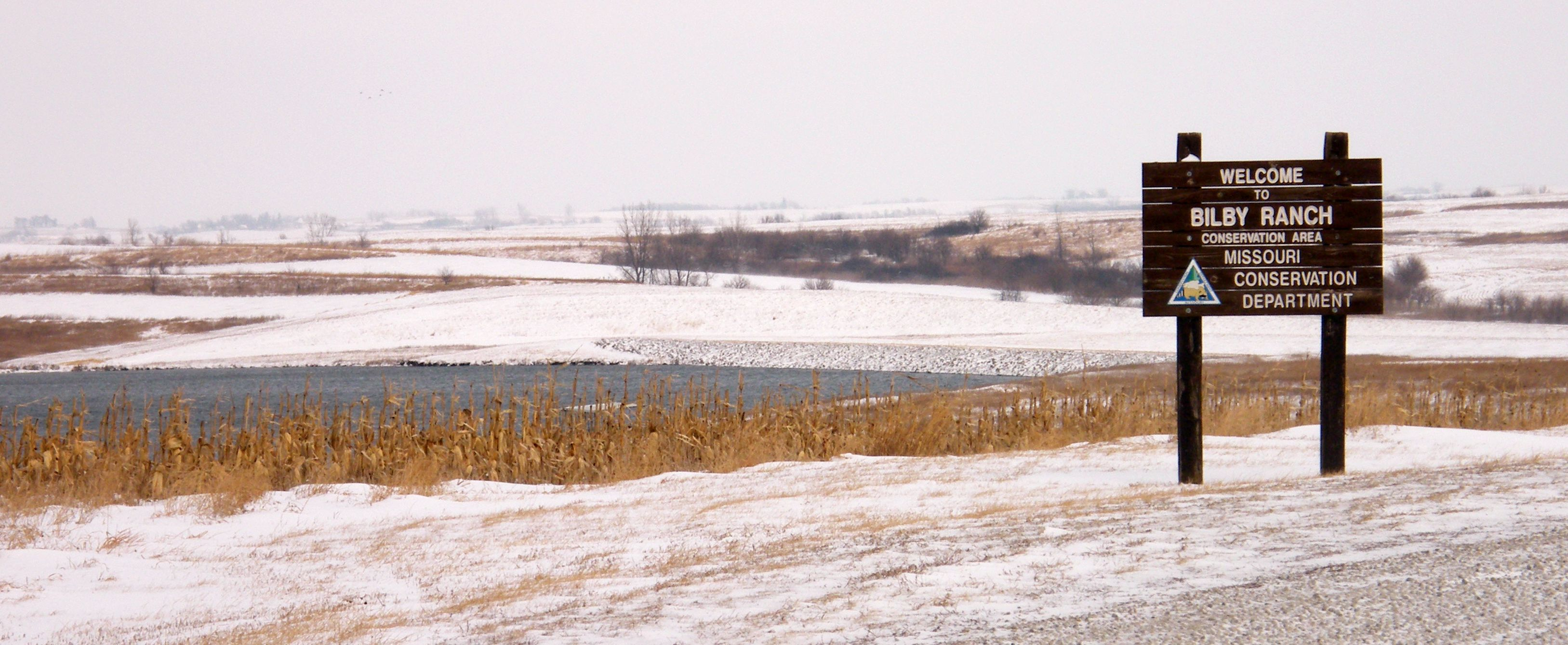
Bilby Ranch

John S. Bilby (January 10, 1832 – November 26, 1919) was the founder of the Bilby Ranch, which claimed to be the second largest ranch in the United States in the late 19th and early 20th centuries.

The ranch headquartered in Quitman, Missouri, had holdings throughout the U.S. Southwest. Bilby settled in Nodaway County, Missouri, in 1868 and began expanding his empire using one property as collateral for the next. Soon it stretched from Missouri to Oklahoma to Texas to New Mexico. A dispute over the cattle operations was addressed by the United States Supreme Court in 1887 in the case of Teal v. Bilby. At its peak the ranch was reported to be 200,000 acres.

However, since the ranch was based on borrowed funds it collapsed in 1936, and Bilby was left with the only unmortgaged property—the home in Quitman. He died after being hit by a train shortly after the collapse of the ranch.

Portions of the ranch became the O Bar O Ranch in Texas and joined King Ranch, which is the largest ranch in the United States as of February 2024.

In 1987, the State of Missouri acquired 5,110 acres (20.7 km^{2}) of the land around Quitman to form the Bilby Ranch Lake Conservation Area.
