= Bilby Ranch Lake Conservation Area =

Protected land in Missouri, U.S.

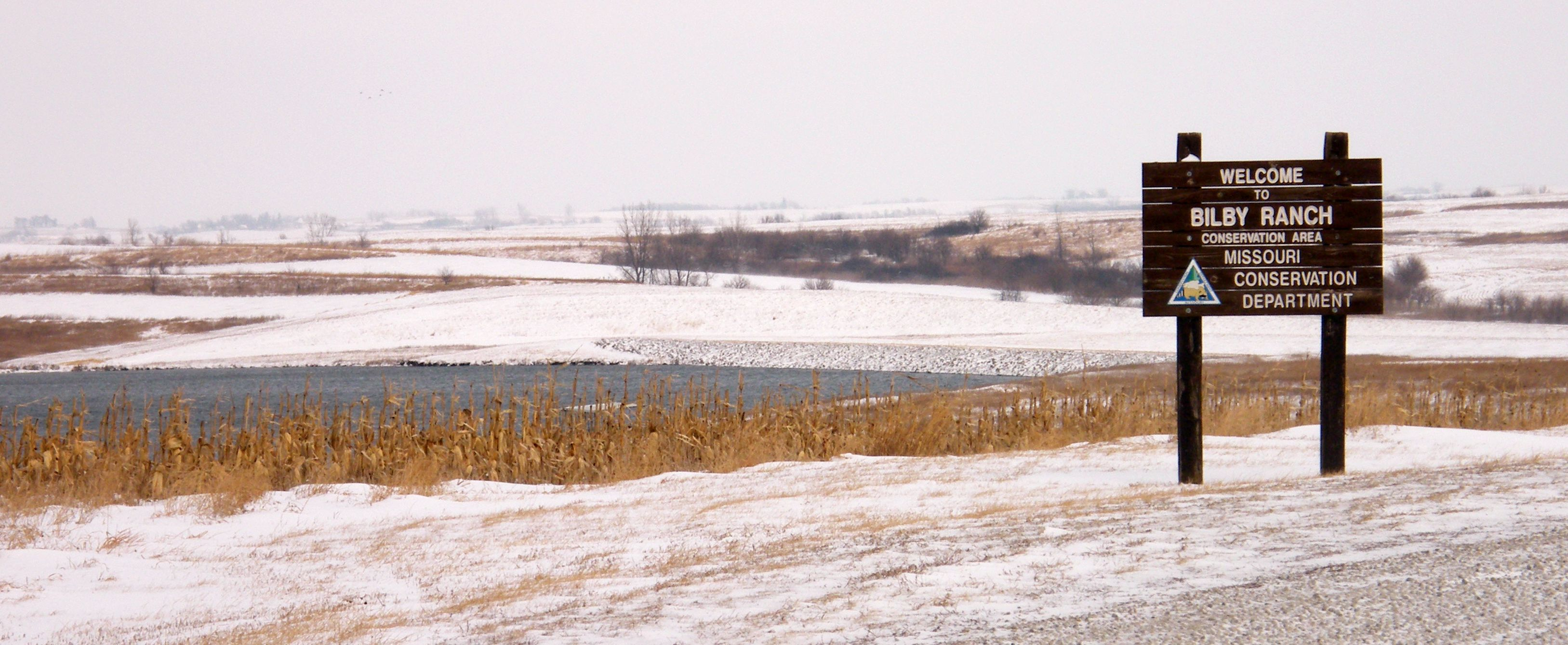
- Bilby Ranch Lake in the snow

- Location within Missouri
- Location: Nodaway County, Missouri, United States
- Nearest city: Quitman, Missouri
- Coordinates: 40°20′54″N 95°08′04″W
- Area: 5,111 acres (2,068 ha)
- Elevation: 1,050 ft (320 m)
- Established: 1987
- Governing body: Missouri Department of Conservation
- Website: Official website

Bilby Ranch Lake Conservation Area is a public conservation area located in northwest Missouri, United States. The 5,111-acre (2,068 ha) conservation area was established in 1987 when the Missouri Department of Conservation (MDC) purchased a large tract of land that was once part of John S. Bilby's massive 26,000-acre ranch.

== Description ==
The area is characterized by a mix of native prairie, cropland, and forested corridors, making it one of the largest remaining prairie landscapes in northern Missouri. It includes approximately 150 acres of surface water, highlighted by the 110-acre Bilby Ranch Lake, located in the southeastern portion of the property.

== Recreation and Facilities ==
Bilby Ranch Lake Conservation Area offers a variety of outdoor recreational opportunities. Anglers can fish for largemouth bass, channel catfish, and bluegill in the lake and surrounding ponds. Facilities include a concrete boat ramp, floating fishing dock, fish cleaning station, and a privy.

The area is also popular for hunting, particularly for ring-necked pheasant, which is a management priority on the property. Other game species include white-tailed deer, wild turkey, and various small game. The conservation area is open to hiking, birdwatching, and nature photography, with several unpaved roads and trails providing access to different habitats.

== History ==
The land was once part of the historic Bilby Ranch, established by John S. Bilby in the 19th century. By 1900, the ranch had grown into one of the largest livestock operations in the United States. A small hamlet called Fairview was located in the southeast of the present-day conservation area. The ranch remained active until the Great Depression led to its dissolution in 1936.

== Geography ==
The nearest sizable city to the conservation area is Maryville, located approximately 14 miles east of Bilby ranch along Highway 46. Other communities nearby include Skidmore to its southeast and Quitman to its northeast.

The conservation area lies a few miles west of the Nodaway River. Huff Creek drains the northern portion of the park, and Minnesota Valley Creek sources from the southwestern reaches of Bilby Ranch.

== See also ==
- John S. Bilby
- List of Missouri conservation areas – Northwest region
