= Quitman, Missouri =

Unincorporated community in Missouri, U.S.

- Census-designated place
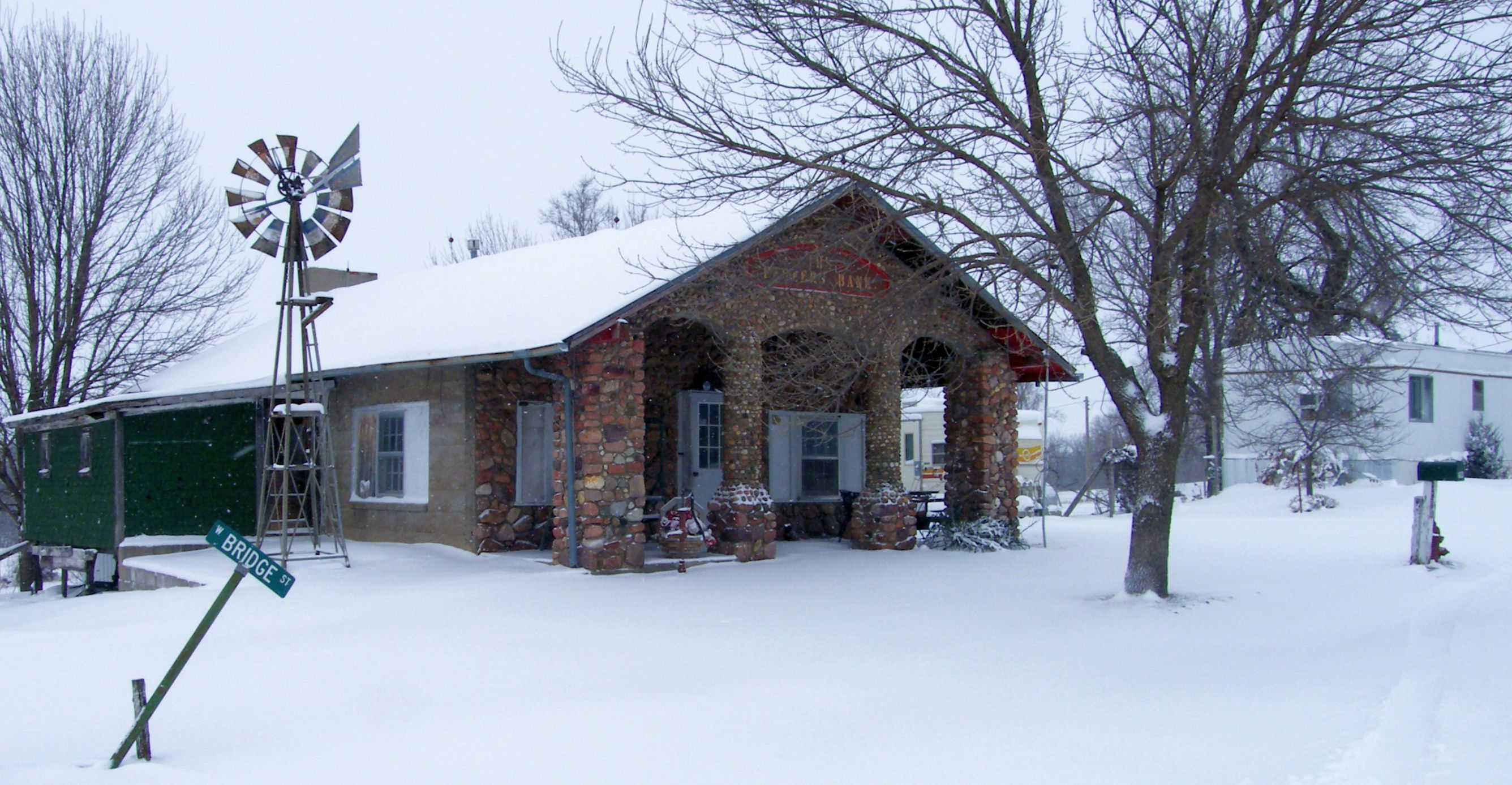
- Quitman in 2009

- Location of Quitman, Missouri

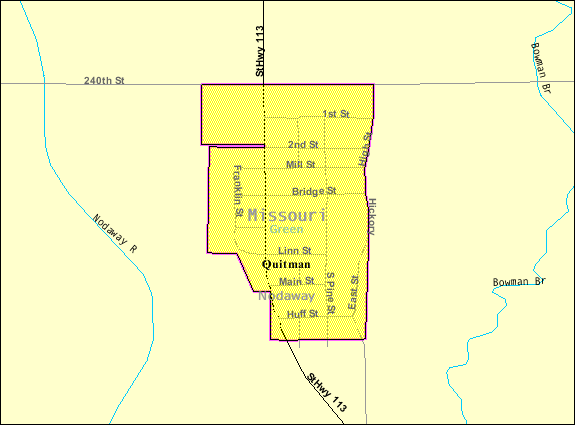
- U.S. Census Map
- Coordinates: 40°22′24″N 95°04′37″W
- Country: United States
- State: Missouri
- County: Nodaway
- Township: Green
- Platted: 1856
- P.O. Commissioned: 1861
- Incorporated: 1881

Area
  - Total: 0.16 sq mi (0.41 km^{2})
  - Land: 0.16 sq mi (0.41 km^{2})
  - Water: 0 sq mi (0.00 km^{2})
- Elevation: 965 ft (294 m)

Population (2020)
  - Total: 42
  - Density: 267.7/sq mi (103.35/km^{2})
- Time zone: UTC-6 (Central (CST))
  - Summer (DST): UTC-5 (CDT)
- ZIP code: 64478
- Area code: 660
- FIPS code: 29-60410
- GNIS feature ID: 2787909

Quitman is a census-designated place (CDP) in west central Nodaway County, Missouri, United States. The population was 42 at the 2020 census.

== History ==
Originally it was called Russellville which was first platted in 1856 by R. R. Russell. Later, the name was changed to Quitman in honor of John A. Quitman, a strongly pro-slavery former governor of Mississippi, leader of the Fire Eaters, and veteran in the Mexican–American War. The city received a post office in November 1861 and was incorporated on February 8, 1881 when it was a stop on the Nodaway Valley Railroad (which was building the railroad for the Kansas City, St. Joseph and Council Bluffs Railroad that eventually became part of the Burlington Northern network. The railroad no longer travels through Quitman.

In November 2012, the Nodaway County Commission voted to disincorporate Quitman after local residents asked for it.

== Geography ==
The community is located on Missouri Route 113 between Skidmore 5.5 miles to the south and Burlington Junction, Missouri 4.5 miles to the north. The Nodaway River flows past the west side of the community, and Bowman Branch passes by Quitman to the east and joins the Nodaway River just south of it. Bilby Ranch Lake Conservation Area is three miles to the west.

According to the United States Census Bureau, the city has a total area of 0.13 square miles (0.34 km^{2}), all land.

== Demographics ==
Historical population
Census	Pop.	Note	%±
1880	335		—
1890	332		−0.9%
1900	356		7.2%
1910	231		−35.1%
1920	195		−15.6%
1930	144		−26.2%
1940	195		35.4%
1950	135		−30.8%
1960	113		−16.3%
1970	95		−15.9%
1980	66		−30.5%
1990	47		−28.8%
2000	46		−2.1%
2010	45		−2.2%
2020	42		−6.7%
U.S. Decennial Census

=== 2010 census ===
As of the census of 2010, there were 45 people, 23 households, and 11 families living in the city. The population density was 346.2 inhabitants per square mile (133.7/km^{2}). There were 27 housing units at an average density of 207.7 per square mile (80.2/km^{2}). The racial makeup of the city was 100.0% White.

There were 23 households, of which 26.1% had children under the age of 18 living with them, 39.1% were married couples living together, 8.7% had a female householder with no husband present, and 52.2% were non-families. 43.5% of all households were made up of individuals, and 17.3% had someone living alone who was 65 years of age or older. The average household size was 1.96 and the average family size was 2.73.

The median age in the city was 44.5 years. 20% of residents were under the age of 18; 4.4% were between the ages of 18 and 24; 26.7% were from 25 to 44; 37.7% were from 45 to 64; and 11.1% were 65 years of age or older. The gender makeup of the city was 48.9% male and 51.1% female.

=== 2000 census ===
As of the census of 2000, there were 46 people, 21 households, and 11 families living in the town. The population density was 331.1 inhabitants per square mile (127.8/km^{2}). There were 24 housing units at an average density of 172.7 per square mile (66.7/km^{2}). Everybody in the town was white.

There were 21 households, out of which six had children under the age of 18 living with them, ten were married couples living together, one had a female householder with no husband present, and nine were non-families. Nine of all households were made up of individuals, and three had someone living alone who was 65 years of age or older. The average household size was 2.19 and the average family size was 3.00.

In the town the population was spread out, with thirteen people under the age of 18, one between 18 and 24, ten from 25 to 44, seventeen from 45 to 64, and five who were 65 years of age or older. The median age was 44 years. In town, there were twenty-three males (of whom sixteen were over age 18), and twenty-three females (of whom seventeen were over age 18).

The median income for a household in the town was $29,375, and the median income for a family was $31,250. Males had a median income of $21,250 versus $16,500 for females. The per capita income for the town was $11,644. There were 10.5% of families and 21.0% of the population living below the poverty line, including 36.8% of under eighteens and none of those over 64.

== Education ==
It is in the West Nodaway R-I School District. The secondary school is West Nodaway High School.

== Notable people ==
- John S. Bilby, founder of Bilby Ranch, which in the early 1900s was the second largest ranch in the United States.
- Forrest C. Donnell, former Missouri Governor
- Harley Race, Professional wrestling legend

== See also ==
- List of census-designated places in Missouri
