= List of tornadoes in the outbreak of May 19–22, 2024 =

From May 19–22, 2024, a major tornado outbreak occurred across the central United States.

== Confirmed tornadoes ==
Daily statistics
Date	Total	EFU	EF0	EF1	EF2	EF3	EF4	EF5	Deaths	Injuries
May 19	32	7	10	12	3	0	0	0	0	0
May 20	3	1	2	0	0	0	0	0	0	0
May 21	42	0	15	23	2	1	1	0	5	39
May 22	5	0	0	3	1	1	0	0	0	30
Total	82	8	27	38	7	2	1	0	5	69

=== May 19 event ===
List of confirmed tornadoes – Sunday, May 19, 2024 (Note: All dates are based on the local time zone where the tornado touched down; however, all times are in Coordinated Universal Time for consistency.)
EF#	Location	County / Parish	State	Start Coord.	Time (UTC)	Path length	Max width
EFU	S of Lindon	Washington	CO	39.57°N 103.43°W	19:12–19:22	0.21 mi (0.34 km)	25 yd (23 m)
EFU	This well-photographed tornado remained over open fields for the duration of its life.						
EF1	NW of Russell	Russell	KS	38.899°N 98.8971°W	20:32–20:42	1.62 mi (2.61 km)	15 yd (14 m)
EF1	Numerous power poles were broken and leaning.						
EF2	NNE of Iliff	Logan	CO	40.83°N 103.02°W	20:45–20:56	1.57 mi (2.53 km)	30 yd (27 m)
EF2	This strong tornado initially caused damage by uprooting and snapping several trees near a residence, with debris embedded in the home's exterior. It then damaged another residence, removing an awning, siding, and roofing shingles. The tornado reached peak intensity as it snapped three telephone poles at EF2 strength. It continued to overturn farm equipment and damage an outbuilding before lifting over open fields.						
EFU	NE of Iliff	Logan	CO	40.82°N 102.95°W	20:56	0.01 mi (0.016 km)	15 yd (14 m)
EFU	A tornado occurred just to the east of a school before quickly lifting.						
EF0	ENE of Wilson	Ellsworth	KS	38.848°N 98.3941°W	21:20–21:25	0.17 mi (0.27 km)	10 yd (9.1 m)
EF0	A pivot system was flipped and a KDOT sign was twisted.						
EFU	SSE of Fleming	Logan	CO	40.64°N 102.81°W	21:28–21:33	0.16 mi (0.26 km)	25 yd (23 m)
EFU	This brief tornado occurred over open fields.						
EF0	E of Roll	Roger Mills	OK	35.769°N 99.624°W	23:19	0.2 mi (0.32 km)	30 yd (27 m)
EF0	Two storm chasers observed a short-lived tornado that damaged a barn.						
EF0	NNE of Strong City	Roger Mills	OK	35.755°N 99.535°W	23:27	0.5 mi (0.80 km)	30 yd (27 m)
EF0	A compressor shed was damaged.						
EFU	NE of Adair	McDonough	IL	40.44°N 90.48°W	23:35–23:40	0.63 mi (1.01 km)	20 yd (18 m)
EFU	This brief landspout that caused no damage.						
EF0	ENE of Strong City to NW of Hammon	Roger Mills	OK	35.698°N 99.486°W	23:43–23:46	1.92 mi (3.09 km)	30 yd (27 m)
EF0	This tornado was observed by multiple storm chasers. A barn and nearby trees were damaged.						
EFU	NNW of Ellinwood	Barton	KS	38.39°N 98.61°W	23:47–23:49	1.05 mi (1.69 km)	40 yd (37 m)
EFU	A tornado was recorded. It did not cause damage.						
EFU	NE of Hammon	Custer	OK	35.661°N 99.332°W	23:58–00:00	0.51 mi (0.82 km)	100 yd (91 m)
EFU	A storm chaser observed a partially rain-wrapped tornado that caused no known damage.						
EF2	ENE of Butler to WNW of Custer City	Custer	OK	35.673°N 99.07°W	00:28–00:44	6.7 mi (10.8 km)	1,760 yd (1,610 m)
EF2	This tornado initially caused narrow damage before rapidly intensifying into a large multiple-vortex tornado, reaching a width of about one mile. It caused widespread tree and power pole damage, with the most significant structural impacts along its path, including destroyed outbuildings, roof damage to a home, and debris blown considerable distances. The tornado's intensity, suggested by preliminary radar data, indicates it may have been stronger locally than the EF2 rating determined by the damage survey. The tornado eventually narrowed as it approached US 183 before dissipating.						
EF1	NW of Custer City	Custer	OK	35.71°N 99.001°W	00:39–01:02	6.7 mi (10.8 km)	400 yd (370 m)
EF1	This tornado developed to the north of the previous tornado, causing significant damage along its path. It destroyed at least two outbuildings and heavily damaged several others, while also causing tree and power pole damage. The tornado dissipated north of Custer City after crossing a US 183.						
EF1	ESE of Custer City to N of Weatherford	Custer	OK	35.629°N 98.774°W	01:05–01:14	5 mi (8.0 km)	440 yd (400 m)
EF1	A tornado caused significant roof damage to a home and damaged shingles on at least two others as it moved eastward. A mobile home sustained roof and siding damage, several outbuildings were damaged or destroyed, and numerous trees and power poles were impacted.						
EFU	N of Weatherford	Custer	OK	35.576°N 98.697°W	01:13	0.4 mi (0.64 km)	30 yd (27 m)
EFU	Satellite imagery indicated a narrow damage swath in a farm field.						
EF1	NW of Burns	Marion	KS	38.1°N 96.92°W	01:16–01:18	1.09 mi (1.75 km)	40 yd (37 m)
EF1	Trees were damaged.						
EF0	SSE of Hydro	Caddo	OK	35.548°N 98.574°W	01:24–01:25	1 mi (1.6 km)	40 yd (37 m)
EF0	A semi-truck was blown over on I-40 and an ODOT facility was damaged. This tornado was likely anticyclonic.						
EF1	WSW of Geary	Blaine	OK	35.6032°N 98.4733°W	01:37–01:38	0.47 mi (0.76 km)	50 yd (46 m)
EF1	Trees were damaged.						
EF1	W of Bridgeport	Blaine, Caddo	OK	35.5521°N 98.4399°W	01:37–01:39	0.6 mi (0.97 km)	50 yd (46 m)
EF1	An anticyclonic tornado developed in Blaine County and quickly moved into Caddo County, where scattered tree damage occurred.						
EF2	NE of Union City to WSW of Yukon	Canadian	OK	35.448°N 97.853°W	02:32–02:48	3.5 mi (5.6 km)	300 yd (270 m)
EF2	This tornado caused significant roof damage to a few houses, blew in windows, and damaged several outbuildings as it moved northeast. The primary damage along its path, however, was to trees and power poles.						
EF0	NE of Union City	Canadian	OK	35.452°N 97.873°W	02:41–02:44	1.2 mi (1.9 km)	300 yd (270 m)
EF0	An off-duty SPC meteorologist observed a tornado that inflicted some shingle damage to a home.						
EF0	NNE of Union City to southern El Reno	Canadian	OK	38.1°N 96.92°W	02:41–02:53	3 mi (4.8 km)	30 yd (27 m)
EF0	A barn was damaged, and a hay bale was tossed. Some street signs were blown over as well.						
EF0	SW of Auburn	Osage	KS	38.8332°N 95.8409°W	02:44–02:48	0.69 mi (1.11 km)	40 yd (37 m)
EF0	This brief tornado damaged trees and tree limbs.						
EF0	SSW of Dover	Shawnee	KS	38.9549°N 95.9375°W	03:08–03:10	0.08 mi (0.13 km)	30 yd (27 m)
EF0	Radar indicated a small tornado debris signature from this brief tornado that damaged tree limbs.						
EF0	Southwestern Oklahoma City	Oklahoma	OK	35.408°N 97.574°W	03:10	0.1 mi (0.16 km)	10 yd (9.1 m)
EF0	A storm chaser from a local TV station observed a brief tornado at the I-44/I-240 interchange. No damage was found, but the tornado was given an EF0 rating due to its visually weak appearance.						
EF1	Southern Gardner	Johnson	KS	38.7837°N 94.9398°W	03:19–03:21	0.88 mi (1.42 km)	75 yd (69 m)
EF1	This short-lived tornado tipped a shipping container and damaged the roof of an apartment complex.						
EF1	NW of De Soto to ENE of Linwood	Leavenworth	KS	38.999°N 94.9953°W	03:26–03:28	1.51 mi (2.43 km)	150 yd (140 m)
EF1	Trees were damaged as the tornado remained over rural areas.						
EF1	Western Shawnee	Johnson	KS	39.0153°N 94.8435°W	03:31–03:36	1.63 mi (2.62 km)	105 yd (96 m)
EF1	A high-end EF1 tornado damaged the concession stand and administrative building near a high school. The tornado moved into neighborhoods, damaging roofs and snapping and uprooting trees.						
EF1	Prairie Village to Fairway	Johnson	KS	38.99°N 94.66°W	03:39–03:45	2.63 mi (4.23 km)	150 yd (140 m)
EF1	Trees were uprooted and snapped, and homes suffered roof damage.						
EF1	NW of Waynoka	Woods	OK	36.646°N 98.962°W	03:53–03:57	2.7 mi (4.3 km)	300 yd (270 m)
EF1	A number of trees were snapped, and two oil field sites were damaged.						
EF1	NNW of Waynoka	Woods	OK	36.653°N 98.938°W	04:01–04:07	1.5 mi (2.4 km)	40 yd (37 m)
EF1	Trees were snapped or uprooted, an oil tank was blown or rolled about 300 yards (270 m), and a barn was damaged.						

=== May 20 event ===
List of confirmed tornadoes – Monday, May 20, 2024
EF#	Location	County / Parish	State	Start Coord.	Time (UTC)	Path length	Max width
EF0	WNW of Hayfield	Dodge	MN	43.9268°N 92.9896°W	23:10–23:15	1.16 mi (1.87 km)	50 yd (46 m)
EF0	A landspout tornado briefly occurred over rural land.						
EF0	NW of Hayfield	Dodge	MN	43.9546°N 92.9562°W	23:25–23:28	1.39 mi (2.24 km)	35 yd (32 m)
EF0	This landspout tornado touched down in an open field and lifted rather quickly. The tornado's path was also noted on satellite imagery.						
EFU	SSW of Tennant	Shelby	IA	41.567°N 95.471°W	01:18–01:20	0.42 mi (0.68 km)	20 yd (18 m)
EFU	A landspout occurred over open farmland.						

=== May 21 event ===
List of confirmed tornadoes – Tuesday, May 21, 2024
EF#	Location	County / Parish	State	Start Coord.	Time (UTC)	Path length	Max width
EF0	SE of Duncan	Polk	NE	41.3031°N 97.4716°W	09:54–09:58	4.12 mi (6.63 km)	75 yd (69 m)
EF0	A brief tornado damaged trees, downed power lines and power poles, and overturned several pivots.						
EF0	NE of Richland	Colfax	NE	41.493°N 97.158°W	10:14–10:15	0.51 mi (0.82 km)	50 yd (46 m)
EF0	Many center pivots were overturned, three hog barns lost their roofs, and numerous trees were damaged.						
EF0	WSW of Brainard	Butler	NE	41.151°N 97.067°W	10:23–10:24	0.62 mi (1.00 km)	50 yd (46 m)
EF0	A weak tornado caused minor tree damage.						
EF0	N of Loma	Butler	NE	41.148°N 96.993°W	10:27–10:31	2.64 mi (4.25 km)	50 yd (46 m)
EF0	Trees sustained minor damage.						
EF0	SSW of Inglewood	Saunders	NE	41.396°N 96.511°W	10:45–10:46	0.39 mi (0.63 km)	50 yd (46 m)
EF0	A brief tornado damaged trees and a few homes.						
EF0	N of Coburg	Montgomery	IA	40.942°N 95.285°W	12:10–12:11	0.69 mi (1.11 km)	40 yd (37 m)
EF0	A weak tornado caused intermittent damage to trees and a fence.						
EF1	S of Bethesda	Page	IA	40.799°N 95.128°W	12:32–12:36	3.27 mi (5.26 km)	80 yd (73 m)
EF1	Trees and outbuildings were damaged, including a large barn that sustained significant damage.						
EF0	Northern Yutan	Saunders	NE	41.246°N 96.394°W	17:52–17:53	0.22 mi (0.35 km)	50 yd (46 m)
EF0	This brief tornado broke several branches off of multiple trees within Yutan.						
EF1	WNW of Truesdale	Buena Vista	IA	42.746°N 95.276°W	19:30–19:35	1.64 mi (2.64 km)	75 yd (69 m)
EF1	A high-end EF1 tornado struck three farmsteads. At the first farmstead, roof panels of an outbuilding were blown off and tree damage occurred. At the second farmstead, the roof of a home was torn off and a garage was shifted off its foundation. Tree damage also occurred here. At the third farmstead, a garage door was blown in and grain bins were damaged.						
EF1	Red Oak	Montgomery	IA	40.986°N 95.27°W	19:35–19:40	2.95 mi (4.75 km)	70 yd (64 m)
EF1	A building at a water facility had all of its doors and a wall knocked out. Trees were damaged.						
EF3	S of Nyman to W of Villisca to SSW of Bridgewater	Page, Montgomery, Adams	IA	40.856°N 95.201°W	19:43–20:21	33.86 mi (54.49 km)	1,300 yd (1,200 m)
EF3	See section on this tornado.						
EF4	SSE of Villisca to NW of Corning to Greenfield	Page, Taylor, Adams, Adair	IA	40.887°N 94.957°W	19:57–20:45	42.38 mi (68.20 km)	1,600 yd (1,500 m)
EF4	5 deaths – See article on this tornado – 35 people were injured.						
EF0	SSE of Brayton to ENE of Exira	Audubon	IA	41.5127°N 94.9085°W	20:09–20:18	7.24 mi (11.65 km)	100 yd (91 m)
EF0	This weak tornado damaged only trees.						
EF1	NW of Mercer to northwestern Cromwell	Adams, Union	IA	40.9539°N 94.6758°W	20:18–20:36	12.66 mi (20.37 km)	200 yd (180 m)
EF1	Outbuildings were damaged or destroyed, a grain bin had its top ripped off, a home had minor damage, and trees were uprooted or had limbs snapped off.						
EF2	Eastern Greenfield to S of Dexter	Adair	IA	41.3002°N 94.4473°W	20:39–20:56	14.87 mi (23.93 km)	200 yd (180 m)
EF2	This strong tornado formed on the east side of Greenfield as the main EF4 Greenfield tornado was entering the town and moves northeastward. It caused significant damage on farmsteads along its path, damaging outbuildings and tree groves. It also toppled a wind turbine, and completely destroyed an outbuilding and shredded trees at EF2 intensity. The tornado then quickly weakened and dissipated as it approached the Madison county line.						
EF0	Southern Fairmont	Martin	MN	43.6236°N 94.4659°W	20:48–20:51	2.28 mi (3.67 km)	75 yd (69 m)
EF0	A tornado touched down over Hall Lake, flipping two pontoon boats near the shoreline. As it moved northeast, it snapped or uprooted several dozen trees and knocked down a fence. Near the end of its path, it caused partial outward damage to the wall of a small metal shed before dissipating.						
EF0	S of Macksburg	Union, Madison	IA	41.1504°N 94.2242°W	20:50–20:54	3.97 mi (6.39 km)	70 yd (64 m)
EF0	A weak tornado impacted two farmsteads, damaging the roof of an outbuilding and producing tree damage.						
EF0	Martensdale	Warren	IA	41.3686°N 93.7454°W	21:25–21:26	1.04 mi (1.67 km)	40 yd (37 m)
EF0	This brief tornado tracked through Martensdale, damaging trees and shingles on the roofs of homes.						
EF0	W of Spring Hill	Warren	IA	41.3997°N 93.6787°W	21:28–21:32	2 mi (3.2 km)	75 yd (69 m)
EF0	Trees were downed.						
EF2	Johnston to southeastern Alleman to SE of Zearing	Polk, Story	IA	41.6765°N 93.7623°W	21:30–22:05	40.84 mi (65.73 km)	1,000 yd (910 m)
EF2	This strong, long-track tornado caused a range of damage as it moved through Polk and Story counties. It began with minor damage to homes and trees, including blown-out windows at Johnston High School and roof damage in residential areas. The tornado intensified as it moved northeast, producing EF2 damage, particularly near I-35, where several houses and outbuildings were destroyed or severely damaged. In Story County, the tornado grew wider and caused extensive EF2 damage, including the destruction of a house, snapping of large power poles, and obliteration of trees. The tornado eventually weakened and dissipated. Four injuries occurred.						
EF0	E of Calhoun	Henry	MO	38.4646°N 93.5936°W	22:26–22:28	0.35 mi (0.56 km)	50 yd (46 m)
EF0	A weak tornado lifted the roof off of a metal outbuilding, tossing the metal sides and roof.						
EF1	NW of Verdigris to WSW of Tiawah	Rogers	OK	36.255°N 95.7074°W	22:27–22:36	5.3 mi (8.5 km)	500 yd (460 m)
EF1	A number of house roofs were damaged. Numerous trees were snapped or uprooted on either side of I-44 as well.						
EF1	SW of Tiawah	Rogers	OK	36.2486°N 95.5862°W	22:39–22:41	1 mi (1.6 km)	100 yd (91 m)
EF1	A metal carport was destroyed. Trees were snapped or uprooted.						
EF0	W of Red Wing	Goodhue	MN	44.5599°N 92.6359°W	22:41–22:42	0.69 mi (1.11 km)	25 yd (23 m)
EF0	Approximately twelve to fifteen trees were broken in a grove.						
EF1	NE of St. Charles, MN to western Rollingstone, MN to NNW of Fountain City, WI	Winona (MN), Buffalo (WI)	MN, WI	43.98°N 92.01°W	23:01–23:19	19.74 mi (31.77 km)	110 yd (100 m)
EF1	A tornado caused sporadic damage to farmsteads and trees before crossing the Mississippi River into Wisconsin, where it dissipated.						
EF1	Eastern Cochrane	Buffalo	WI	44.2113°N 91.8398°W	23:14–23:17	3.9 mi (6.3 km)	100 yd (91 m)
EF1	A tornado began at the edge of the Mississippi River and caused minor tree damage. Moving northeast, the tornado destroyed a barn and caused more tree damage at a golf course. The tornado destroyed another barn before dissipating.						
EF1	S of Herold to NW of Glencoe	Buffalo	WI	44.272°N 91.8482°W	23:17–23:20	2.69 mi (4.33 km)	45 yd (41 m)
EF1	A garage and an outbuilding were destroyed. A power pole and some trees were damaged.						
EF1	E of Dewey Corners	Trempealeau	WI	44.2464°N 91.3965°W	23:34–23:35	0.84 mi (1.35 km)	150 yd (140 m)
EF1	A very brief tornado struck a residence, destroying a garage and impaling some 2x4s into the residence. The tornado caused some tree damage before dissipating.						
EF1	Northern Augusta	Eau Claire	WI	44.6809°N 91.1223°W	23:56–00:07	9.47 mi (15.24 km)	440 yd (400 m)
EF1	A fast-moving tornado downed thousands of trees which caused damage to numerous homes upon falling. Portions of roofing was ripped from a few large sheds.						
EF1	NNE of North Branch to SW of Humbird	Jackson	WI	44.4872°N 90.9807°W	23:59–00:02	3.13 mi (5.04 km)	75 yd (69 m)
EF1	An EF1 tornado caused intermittent tree damage.						
EF1	ENE of Humbird to SW of Globe	Clark	WI	44.567°N 90.8068°W	00:08–00:15	6.96 mi (11.20 km)	300 yd (270 m)
EF1	A tornado downed trees and powerlines. Multiple farmsteads were impacted, with the worst damage inflicted to outbuildings.						
EF1	NNE of Christie to SW of Riplinger	Clark	WI	44.6945°N 90.5783°W	00:20–00:29	9.07 mi (14.60 km)	120 yd (110 m)
EF1	This tornado damaged several farmsteads, powerlines and trees.						
EF1	SE of Longwood to Atwood	Clark	WI	44.8464°N 90.5417°W	00:27–00:31	4.04 mi (6.50 km)	150 yd (140 m)
EF1	Trees and several outbuildings were damaged.						
EF1	NNW of Spokeville to SW of Riplinger	Clark	WI	44.7797°N 90.4493°W	00:29–00:31	2.2 mi (3.5 km)	75 yd (69 m)
EF1	A brief tornado damaged a farmstead and trees.						
EF0	E of Riplinger to NNW of Curtiss	Clark	WI	44.8295°N 90.3828°W	00:33–00:34	1.39 mi (2.24 km)	75 yd (69 m)
EF0	This weak tornado damaged a farmstead and a grove of trees.						
EF1	Unity to S of Colby	Clark, Marathon	WI	44.8406°N 90.3247°W	00:34–00:37	4.01 mi (6.45 km)	110 yd (100 m)
EF1	A tornado damaged trees and power lines in Unity. On the west side of town, structural damage occurred to homes and garages. Scattered tree damage continued until the tornado lifted.						
EF1	WSW of Fenwood to S of Wien	Marathon	WI	44.8621°N 90.046°W	00:47–00:50	2.11 mi (3.40 km)	60 yd (55 m)
EF1	A low-end EF1 tornado tracked through forested areas.						
EF1	ESE of Mount Horeb to S of Pine Bluff	Dane	WI	42.9911°N 89.6976°W	00:49–00:54	4.63 mi (7.45 km)	75 yd (69 m)
EF1	This tornado impacted a farm where two sheds were lofted into nearby woods, causing significant tree damage. As it tracked northeast, it crossed a highway and shifted an outbuilding off its foundation. Further along its path, the tornado uprooted or snapped around twenty mature trees at a farmstead before dissipating.						
EF1	SE of Straford to W of Poniatowski	Marathon	WI	44.9548°N 90.0486°W	00:51–00:54	2.13 mi (3.43 km)	80 yd (73 m)
EF1	A tornado damaged trees and caused a barn to collapse. Minor structure damage occurred as well.						
EF1	SSE of Budsin to WSW of Neshkoro	Marquette	WI	43.8837°N 89.3113°W	00:59–01:07	5.27 mi (8.48 km)	60 yd (55 m)
EF1	Up to 40 trees were snapped or uprooted, some of which inflicted significant damage to a home's roof and a garage upon falling.						
EF1	Kaukauna	Outagamie	WI	44.2633°N 88.2947°W	01:58–02:02	2.69 mi (4.33 km)	80 yd (73 m)
EF1	A tornado originally started in southern before crossing the Fox River into the north part of town. It caused damage to trees, a couple of house garages, and the roof of an apartment building.						
EF1	SSE of Detroit Harbor	Door	WI	45.3494°N 86.9145°W	03:32–03:34	2.28 mi (3.67 km)	50 yd (46 m)
EF1	This tornado occurred entirely on Washington Island. Numerous trees were uprooted with some trunks snapped. One outbuilding had its walls collapsed as well.						

=== May 22 event ===
List of confirmed tornadoes – Wednesday, May 22, 2024
EF#	Location	County / Parish	State	Start Coord.	Time (UTC)	Path length	Max width
EF1	Quinton	Pittsburg, Haskell	OK	35.1235°N 95.3841°W	14:37–14:44	2.9 mi (4.7 km)	300 yd (270 m)
EF1	The roofs of homes were damaged. Trees were snapped or uprooted.						
EF3	SSW of Sterling City	Sterling, Tom Green	TX	31.5844°N 101.1025°W	20:29–20:50	4.79 mi (7.71 km)	400 yd (370 m)
EF3	A tornado touched down on a ranch house, damaging its roof and flipping an RV trailer. Two utility poles were destroyed and several others were damaged. An oil pump jack was overturned, trees were severely damaged with only stubs remaining on some, and caliche roads were stripped of their rocks, grass, and top soil.						
EF2	SSE of Morgan's Point Resort to WNW of Temple	Bell	TX	31.1334°N 97.4388°W	23:21–23:26	2.78 mi (4.47 km)	420 yd (380 m)
EF2	Many homes sustained roof and window damage, including four that lost most of their roof and some outside walls. Additional businesses were damaged, including some that lost most of their roof. Several cars were flipped or otherwise damaged. Power poles and trees were damaged or snapped. In total, 30 people were injured. Rear flank downdraft winds upwards of 90 mph (140 km/h) continued through Temple.						
EF1	NE of Heidenheimer	Bell	TX	31.0455°N 97.3026°W	23:33–23:35	2.2 mi (3.5 km)	100 yd (91 m)
EF1	This tornado was the second one produced by the Temple supercell. It caused roof damage to structures, some significant. More than a dozen transmission towers were flipped on their side. Many trees were heavily damaged.						
EF1	SSW of Haughton	Bossier	LA	32.4006°N 93.553°W	00:30–00:31	0.22 mi (0.35 km)	100 yd (91 m)
EF1	A brief tornado ripped a carport from a house, collapsed the door of a metal building system, and blew the roof off an outbuilding. Many trees were snapped or uprooted.						

== See also ==
- Weather of 2024
- Tornadoes of 2024
- List of North American tornadoes and tornado outbreaks
- List of F4 and EF4 tornadoes
  - List of F4 and EF4 tornadoes (2020–present)
