= Tornado outbreak of May 19–22, 2024 =

2024 tornado outbreak in the Central United States

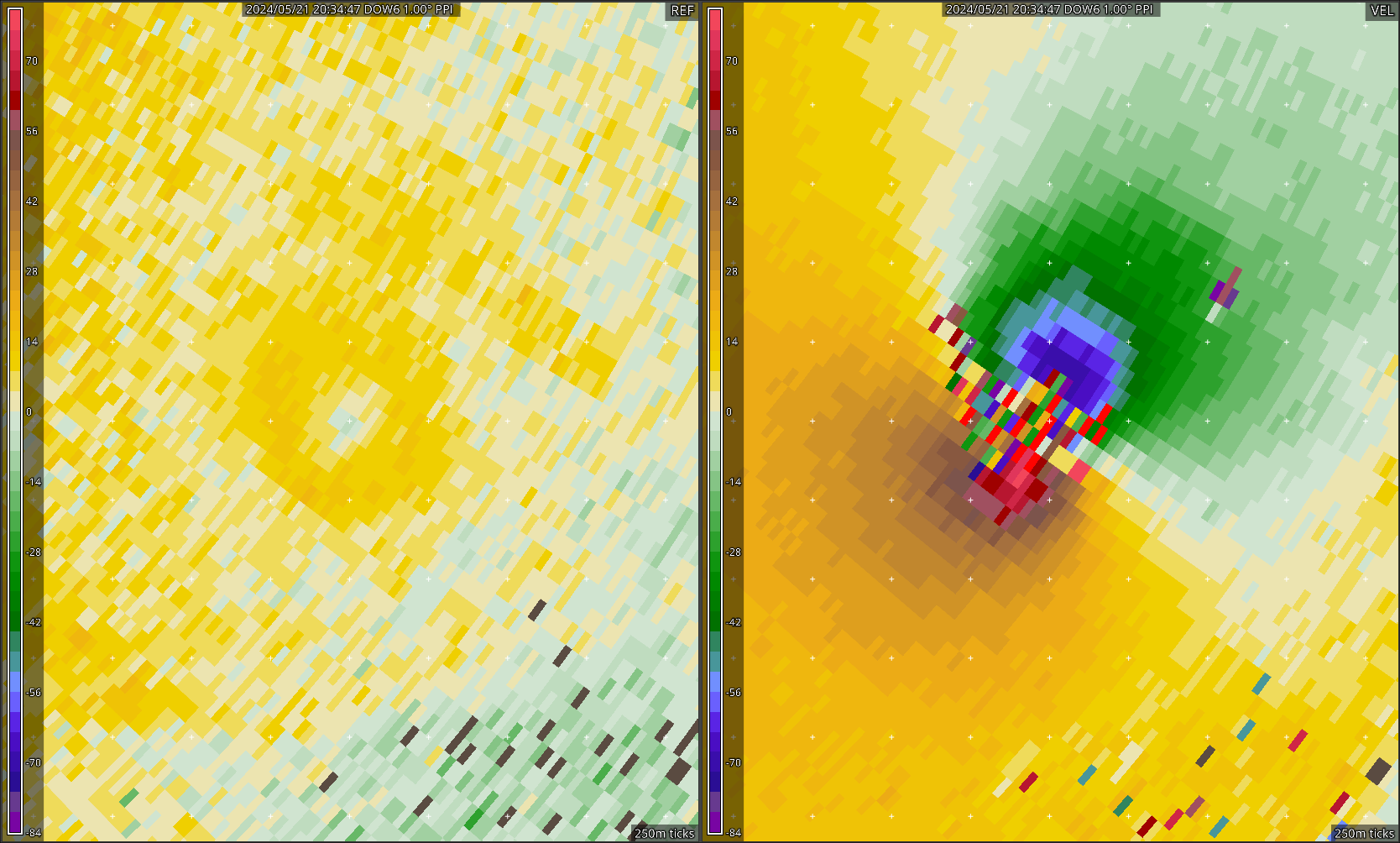
- A radar imagery from DOW6 during the Greenfield, Iowa tornado.

Meteorological history
- Duration: May 19–22, 2024

Tornado outbreak
- Tornadoes: 81
- Max. rating: EF4 tornado
- Duration: 3 days, 5 hours, 19 minutes
- Highest winds: Tornadic – 185 mph (298 km/h) (Greenfield, IA EF4 tornado on May 21)*; *Wind gusts of up to 309–318 mph (497–512 km/h) were calculated in this tornado by Doppler on Wheels (DOW)
- Highest gusts: Non-tornadic – 100 mph (160 km/h) (Saline Airport, Kansas on May 19, Atkins, Iowa on May 21)
- Largest hail: 4.00 inches (10.2 cm) in Yuma and Akron, Colorado on May 20

Overall effects
- Fatalities: 5
- Injuries: 69+
- Damage: $4.9 billion
- Areas affected: Midwestern, Southern and Eastern United States, Canada
- Part of the Tornadoes of 2024

From May 19–22, 2024, a major and widespread tornado outbreak took place across the Central United States, High Plains and the Upper Midwest. On May 19, severe weather produced destructive hurricane-force straight-line winds, very large hail, and numerous tornadoes across mainly Kansas and Oklahoma. One large EF2 tornado prompted the issuance of a tornado emergency for Custer City, Oklahoma while another EF2 tornado passed near Yukon.

On May 21, the Storm Prediction Center issued a moderate risk for severe weather in the states of Iowa, Missouri, Minnesota, Wisconsin, and Illinois, including a 15% hatched risk for significant, long-track tornadoes. As a result, a Particularly Dangerous Situation tornado watch was issued. A few tornadoes occurred near Macedonia and Red Oak. One long-tracked and violent tornado touched down near Villisca, Iowa. Continuing northeast, it toppled and crumpled several wind turbines. The tornado then approached Greenfield, where it intensified to EF4 intensity. Numerous homes were damaged or destroyed with some of them being reduced to their foundations or swept clean. Vehicles sustained severe damage as well and multiple trees were severely debarked. Four people were killed in Greenfield. Another fatality occurred near the town of Corning, about 30 miles southwest of Greenfield when the tornado blew a vehicle off the road. At least 35 people sustained injuries to some degree. A Doppler on Wheels measured 309–318 mph (497–512 km/h) winds in a small area between 30–50 m (98–164 ft) above the surface near Greenfield making this one of the highest windspeeds ever recorded in a tornado.

Five people in total died as a result of this outbreak, all of which came from the Greenfield tornado, while 69 people were injured from tornadic activity on both May 21 and 22, with total damages at just under $5 billion. With a total of 81 confirmed tornadoes, this outbreak was the second during a very active May, following a tornado outbreak from May 6–10, and just days before another large outbreak occurred from May 25–27.

== Meteorological synopsis ==
=== May 19 ===
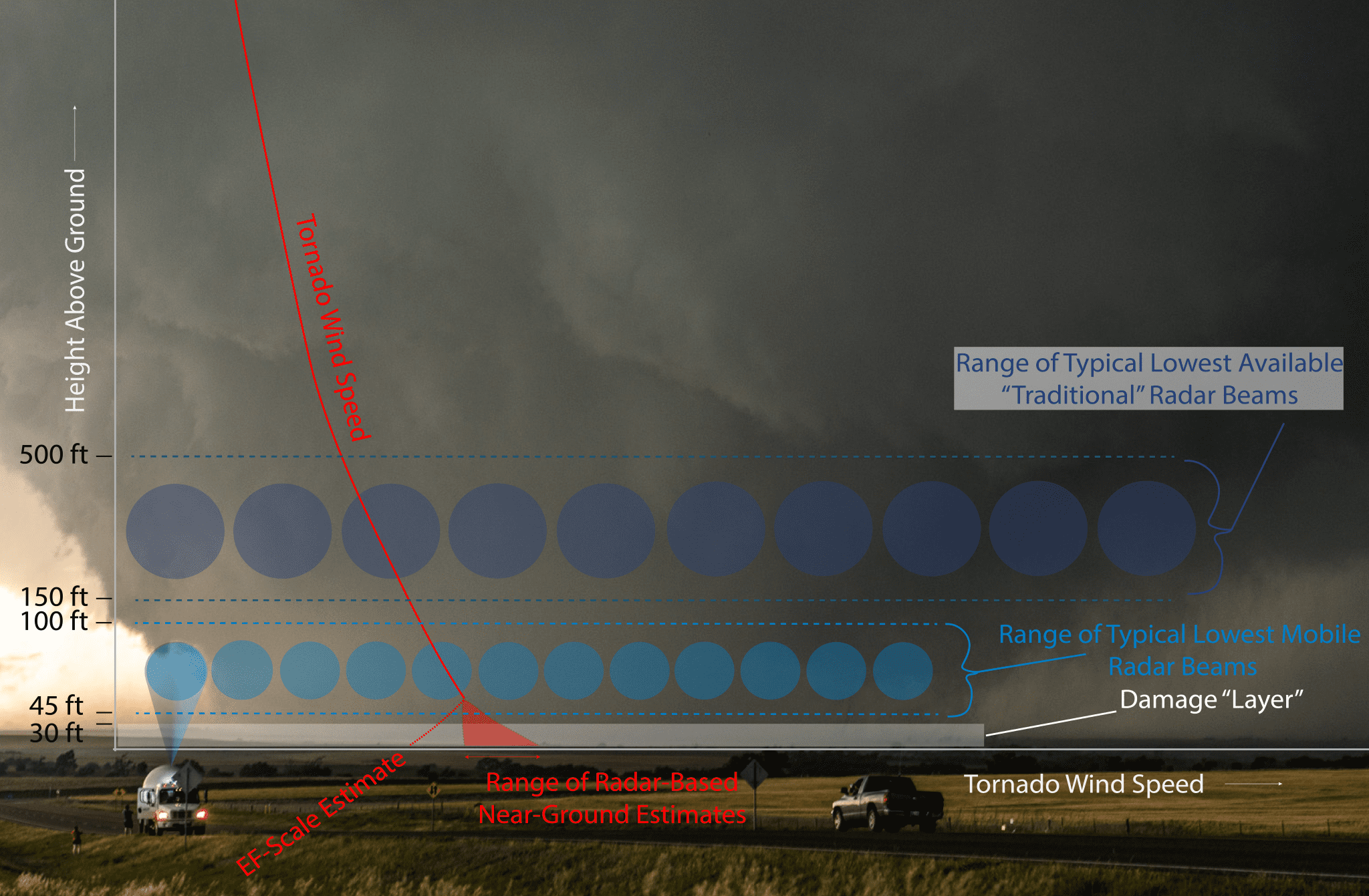
The mile-wide EF2 tornado near Custer City, Oklahoma on May 19, with an overlaid graphic explaining the relationship between mobile doppler data and damage ratings

On May 19, the Storm Prediction Center (SPC) outlined a moderate risk of severe weather across southwest to central Kansas, encompassed by a enhanced risk that extended into northwestern Oklahoma as well. Across the highest risk area, forecasters warned of the potential for a developing derecho capable of producing damaging winds upwards of 100 mph (160 km/h). By the early afternoon hours, a northwest-to-southeast-oriented dryline extended from eastern Colorado into the Texas Panhandle, while a cold front laid across northern and central Kansas. Between these boundaries, dewpoints rose into the lower 60s °F and effective wind shear reached 50 kn (60 mph; 90 km/h), supportive of supercell thunderstorms that would likely evolve into a line of storms as a shortwave trough approached from the west. Given the environment, the SPC issued a particularly dangerous situation severe thunderstorm watch across much of Kansas, northwestern Oklahoma, and the far northeastern Texas Panhandle. An intense supercell in Custer County, Oklahoma, formed an intense multi-vortex tornado near Custer City, resulting in a tornado emergency. This tornado was accompanied by an intense rear-flank downdraft surge, with the total damage path width being recorded at 2.7 mi (4.3 km). A Ka-POL radar from Texas Tech University had been recording the tornado throughout its life cycle, and recorded a wind gust of 87.9 m/s (197 mph; 316 km/h) near the surface, while confirming the tornado's actual width of 1 mi (1.6 km). An intense supercell developed in north-central Kansas, producing large hail in excess of 2 in (51 mm), tornadoes, and a wind gust to 71 kn (82 mph; 131 km/h) near Russell, eventually growing upscale as additional convective clusters formed to the southwest. In Oklahoma, an isolated intense supercell developed and tracked eastward toward the Oklahoma City metropolitan area as low-level wind shear began to increase. Meanwhile, dual mesoscale convective vortices tracked across eastern Kansas, contributing to widespread damaging wind reports—including multiple high wind gusts in excess of 65 kn (75 mph; 120 km/h)—as well as several tornadoes. As the complexes continued into Missouri, they encountered more stable air, causing the severe threat to gradually diminish.

=== May 20–21 ===
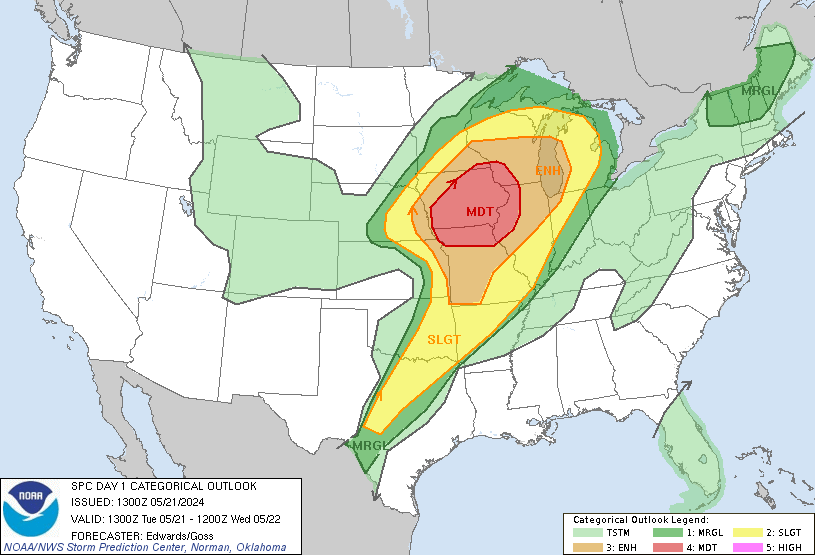
The Storm Prediction Center's Day 1 convective outlook for May 21, 2024, issued at 1300Z, indicating a moderate risk for severe weather over much of Iowa and nearby parts of Wisconsin, Illinois, Missouri, and southeastern Minnesota.

The severe threat shifted northward on May 20 as the SPC issued an enhanced risk across northeastern Colorado and southwestern Nebraska. Here, forecasters expected a mixture of supercells and clusters of storms to originate near the Palmer Divide. Although rich moisture waned with westward extent, dewpoints in the upper 50s to lower 60s °F were expected to spread northwestward from Kansas and into Colorado. Thunderstorms developed in this area by the late afternoon hours, though their growth was stunted by marginal instability. Several discrete supercells eventually evolved across northeastern Colorado and began to grow upscale while encountering a more moist and unstable environment to the east across western Nebraska. The bowing line of storms traversed Nebraska and eventually Iowa through the pre-dawn and early morning hours of May 21, resulting in continued damaging wind gusts.

On May 21, the SPC issued another moderate risk for severe weather in the states of Iowa, Missouri, Minnesota, Wisconsin, and Illinois, including a 15% risk for significant tornadoes. Upper-air soundings observed steep lapse rates in the middle troposphere over parts of Kansas and Missouri on the morning of May 21. The SPC predicted that these conditions would spread into the primary severe weather risk area, overlapping with a moist airmass with dew points approaching 70 °F (21 °C) and leading to strong potential atmospheric instability. That morning, an organized cluster of thunderstorms moved into Iowa after having produced severe wind gusts in central and eastern Nebraska. This line of storms continued across central and eastern Iowa just north of a warm front, presenting a continued threat for damaging wind gusts. Additional storms began to develop along the border between Kansas and Nebraska ahead of an approaching trough. The SPC anticipated that the atmospheric environment over eastern Nebraska and western Iowa would become increasingly conducive for further organization of these storms into supercells. A tornado watch was issued by the SPC for areas near and along the Nebraska–Iowa border region at 11:10 a.m. CDT in anticipation of these changes. At 1:10 p.m. CDT, the SPC issued a tornado watch flagged as a particularly dangerous situation for much of Iowa and parts of surrounding states, including an 80% likelihood of a significant tornado occurring within the watch area. Supercells were active over southwestern Iowa by the mid-afternoon, approaching an environment favorable for tornadogenesis leading into the Des Moines area.

Multiple tornadoes were reported in Iowa, including a damaging tornado near Corning and in Greenfield, where multiple fatalities were reported. Tornadoes were also reported in Minnesota and Wisconsin.

=== May 22 ===
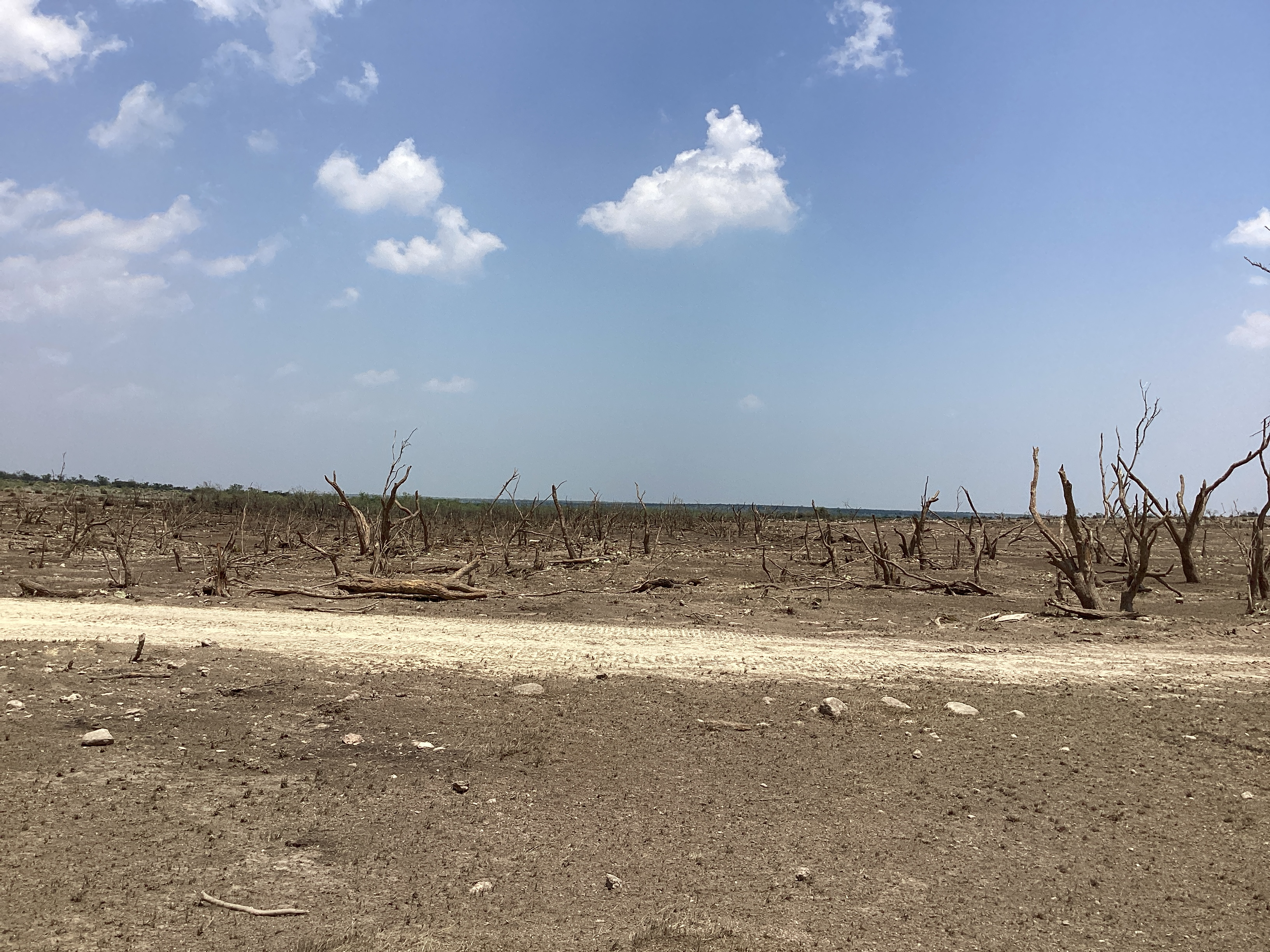
Extreme vegetation damage associated with an EF3 that occurred south of Sterling City, TX.

On May 22, the SPC outlined an enhanced risk extending from central Texas across southeastern Oklahoma, extreme northwestern Louisiana, and southwestern Arkansas. In Texas, a cold front stretched from the Red River southwestward into the Permian Basin, with a surface trough just ahead of that front. Supercells were expected to evolve within a sheared and deeply unstable environment given effective wind shear of 60 kn (70 mph; 110 km/h) and mixed-layer CAPE of 3,000 J/kg. As such, very large hail was anticipated to be the main threat, although isolated tornadoes were possible too before storms grew upscale into one or more convective lines. To the northeast, lines of storms tracked across Oklahoma, Arkansas, and Tennessee, with a primary risk of damaging winds and large hail. Meanwhile, intense supercells developed across central Texas in a very unstable and deeply sheared environment, riding along outflow boundaries that enhanced the tornado threat. A particularly intense EF3 tornado developed southwest of Sterling City where rocks, grass, and topsoil were stripped off of the ground. A 300 yd (270 m) wide path of trees were debarked and sandblasted, with only trunks remaining in some cases. Caliche roads were also stripped. Ongoing storms across Texas eventually evolved into an intense mesoscale convective system moving across eastern portions of the state and into Louisiana through the late evening.

== Confirmed tornadoes ==
Confirmed tornadoes by Enhanced Fujita rating
EFU	EF0	EF1	EF2	EF3	EF4	EF5	Total
8	27	37	6	2	1	0	81

=== Villisca–Carbon–Washington, Iowa ===
Villisca–Carbon–Washington, Iowa
- The tornado seen near Carbon.

Meteorological history
- Formed: May 21, 2024, 2:43 p.m. CDT (UTC−05:00)
- Dissipated: May 21, 2024, 3:21 p.m. CDT (UTC−05:00)
- Duration: 38 minutes

EF3 tornado
- on the Enhanced Fujita scale
- Highest winds: 150 mph (240 km/h)

Overall effects
- Fatalities: 0
- Injuries: 0

This large, long-tracked and intense tornado first touched down near Nyman, Iowa at 2:43 p.m. CDT along 130th Street, initially causing EF0 damage before snapping several trunks from hardwood trees near K Avenue at EF1 intensity. The tornado damaged several houses and uprooted several trees before strengthening to high-end EF2 intensity near the intersection of 240th Street and T Avenue, where the majority of the roof of a house was removed. Crossing U.S. Route 71 and then U.S. Route 34, it weakened as the tornado continued to snap trees and destroying a barn at high-end EF1 intensity near the Hacklebarney Woods in the outskirts of Villisca. Numerous other outposts were damaged or had their roofs collapsed in as well. Restrengthening to EF2, the tornado then struck numerous households on 200th Street, where the majority of the roof of one was removed, while the column anchorage of another ended up failing, destroying most of the house.

The tornado continued to maintain EF2 intensity as it destroyed another barn nearby on Aspen Avenue, before traveling over mostly open terrain and doing little damage and possibly weakening. Approaching 175th Street, the tornado quickly strengthened to its peak intensity at mid-range EF3 intensity, collapsing the walls of a house and leaving only a few rooms standing. It weakened slightly as it crossed 170th Avenue and collapsing the exterior walls of two houses at high-end EF2 strength, before causing EF3 damage again as it collapsed the walls of several more on 150th Avenue. Little damage occurred after as it tracked over more open terrain, causing only EF0 damage at a barn on the edge of its circulation, where a door was collapsed. At this point the tornado turned slightly more to the east, snapping a power pole on 130th Street at EF2 strength. Passing just north of Washington, Iowa, the tornado caused sporadic EF1 and EF2 damage before weakening and lifting at 3:21 p.m. CDT just south of the Adams County border.

Remarkably, no fatalities or injuries occurred from this tornado, which was likely due to it passing over mostly rural regions. With winds of 150 mph (240 km/h), the tornado was on the ground for 38 minutes and tracked 33.86 miles (54.49 km), and was 1,300 yards (1,200 m) at its peak width. Additionally, it was on the ground simultaneously with the Greenfield EF4 tornado to its south for about two-thirds of its path.

=== Nodaway–Corning–Greenfield, Iowa ===
Greenfield, Iowa
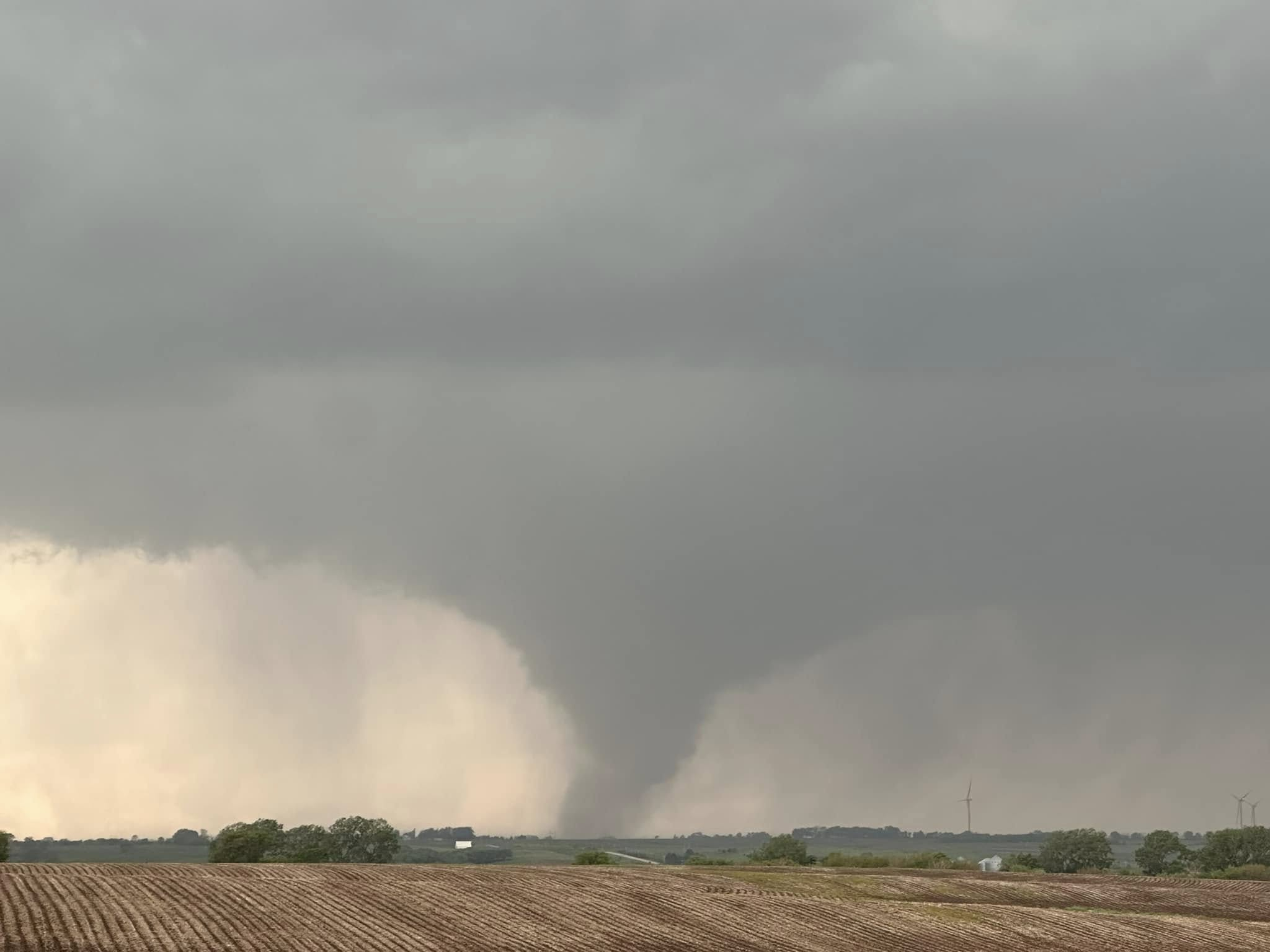
- The Greenfield tornado in rural Iowa

Meteorological history
- Formed: May 21, 2024, 2:57 p.m. CDT (UTC−05:00)
- Dissipated: May 21, 2024, 3:45 p.m. CDT (UTC−05:00)
- Duration: 48 minutes

EF4 tornado
- on the Enhanced Fujita scale
- Highest winds: 185 mph (298 km/h)*; *Wind gusts of up to 309–318 mph (497–512 km/h) were measured in this tornado by Doppler on Wheels (DOW)

Overall effects
- Fatalities: 5
- Injuries: 35

This large, violent, multi-vortex tornado first touched down near the town of Villisca in Page County and moved northeastward at EF1 intensity, destroying all but one wall of an outbuilding and damaging the roof of a home. It then clipped the far northwestern tip of Taylor County before moving into Adams County, inflicting EF0 damage to trees. Continuing northeastward, the tornado reached EF1 intensity again as it approached and passed southeast of Nodaway, snapping wooden power poles, heavily damaging or destroying outbuildings, causing minor damage to homes, and snapping trees. Continuing northeastward, the tornado passed just west of Brooks, destroying and throwing a grain bin and damaging trees. Crossing US 34 west of Corning and continuing northeastward, the tornado heavily damaged or destroyed outbuildings, inflicted roof damage to homes and snapped trees. As the tornado crossed Iowa 148, an outbuilding was obliterated, and a home suffered moderate roof damage with its garage being destroyed. This damage was rated low-end EF2. A woman driving on Iowa 148 died when she was ejected from her car after it was lofted by the tornado. The tornado continued northeastward over rural, open terrain, with the only damage being EF0-EF1 damage to the roofs of an outbuilding and a home along the outer edge of the circulation. The next area of concentrated damage was at the intersection of 150th Street and Notchwood Avenue. The tornado was at high-end EF3 intensity here and a cinderblock home was completely leveled with the debris collapsing into the basement. Outbuildings on the property were destroyed, a loaded grain bin had its top ripped off, a tractor-trailer was lofted and turned 360°, and trees were snapped. To the northeast of here, the tornado continued over open terrain. EF2 damage was inflicted to a large metal outbuilding that lost its roof with EF1 roof damage to a home along with a destroyed outbuilding. It also toppled at least five wind turbines at EF2 strength along this portion of the track, including one turbine that caught on fire. The tornado exhibited violent motion and multiple vortices along this segment of the path as well.

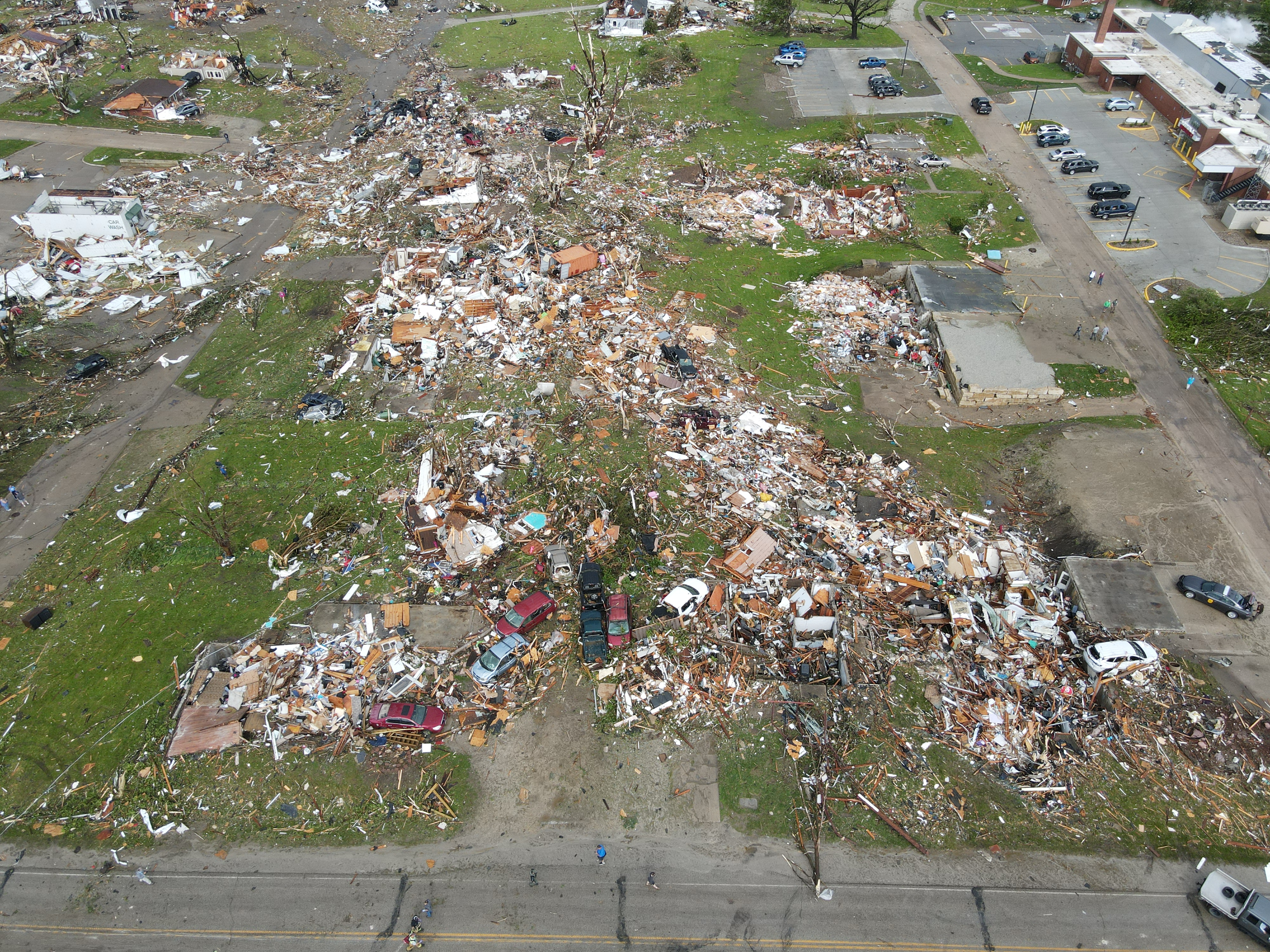
Aerial photo of widespread EF4 damage in Greenfield

The tornado then crossed into Adair County and continued northeastward through Richland Township at EF1 intensity, uprooting and snapping trees, inflicting roof and siding damage to a home, toppling a silo, and damaging an outbuilding. After toppling another wind turbine, knocking down a metal transmission tower, and destroying an outbuilding at EF2 intensity, the tornado quickly became violent and reached low-end EF4 intensity, leveling multiple homes and outbuildings. Severe damage to other homes and outbuildings also occurred and trees were snapped, including some that had partial debarking. As the tornado approached Greenfield from the southwest, it inflicted EF1-EF3 damage with two homes and several outbuildings being destroyed, another home suffering severe roof damage, and multiple vehicles being tossed. The tornado then turned east-northeastward and became violent again, reaching its peak intensity of mid-range EF4 as it moved through Greenfield. Dozens of homes were leveled with some homes being partially to completely swept away, and mobile homes and outbuildings were obliterated. Many other homes suffered extensive roof and exterior wall damage or were shifted off their foundations, and many large trees were snapped and stubbed, including some that landed on and contributed to houses being leveled. All throughout the town, vehicles were destroyed and wooden power poles were snapped as well. Four fatalities and 35 injuries were reported in the town. As the tornado moved through the town, a Doppler on Wheels measured winds initially reported as being at least >250 mph (400 km/h), "possibly as high as 290 mph (470 km/h)" at 48 yards (44 m) above the surface. Pieter Groenemeijer, the director of the European Severe Storms Laboratory noted that "on the IF-scale, 250 mph measured below 60 m above ground level is IF4 on the IF-scale, 290 mph is IF5." After further analysis, this report was revised to winds of 308–319 mph (496–513 km/h) at 36–38 yards (33–35 m) above the surface. An EF2 tornado developed to the northeast of Greenfield as the violent tornado moved through the town. After exiting Greenfield, this tornado moved east-northeastward, weakened, and dissipated over open terrain as the other tornado became the dominant circulation within the supercell.

The tornado was on the ground for 48 minutes, traveled 43.07 mi (69.31 km), and had a peak width of 1,600 yd (1.5 km). Five people were killed and at least 35 others were injured.

== Impact ==
In the hours following the outbreak, emergency personnel as well as storm chasers rushed into Greenfield where the most severe impacts were to provide aid. Surrounding communities such as Red Oak quickly responded in Greenfield, with aid also coming from communities on the borders of Nebraska and Missouri. The local St. John's Catholic Church parking lot was set up as a center for volunteers. In a press conference later that day, Iowa State Patrol held a press conference in Adair County, which also included the announcements of a one-day curfew in Greenfield and the establishment of security checkpoints to get into town, with only residents being allowed to enter in the immediate aftermath. Volunteers from the Y'all Squad, a non-profit established by YouTube meteorologist Ryan Hall, Y'all, entered Greenfield to assist immediate recovery efforts hours after the tornado. Hall's audience also raised $93,000 in recovery funds in the hours after the storm.

The tornado's damage scar through Greenfield was visible on satellite imagery. Governor of Iowa Kim Reynolds toured the damage the following day, describing the views as "horrific". Reynolds stated that personnel from FEMA were in Greenfield, who would be coordinating local and state recovery personnel. Due to timely response, 50% of the town's power was restored by Thursday morning. FEMA administrator Deanne Criswell, who had been working with a team in Minden, another rural Iowa community that was impacted by an EF3 tornado weeks prior, visited Greenfield on May 23 alongside Reynolds to assess damage and determine whether or not the area qualified for federal assistance, with Reynolds submitting an application for an expedited presidential disaster declaration the day prior. On May 24, president Joe Biden approved Reynolds' request for federal assistance and issued a major disaster declaration for Adair County and other counties that had experienced severe weather on May 21. Several people were killed, and dozens were injured in Greenfield, Iowa. Hospitals in the Adair County Health System were evacuated. Multiple fatalities and at least a dozen injuries had been confirmed. There was also a curfew in effect indefinitely, and authorities had limited traffic in and out of town.

== See also ==
- Weather of 2024
- Research on tornadoes in 2024
- List of North American tornadoes and tornado outbreaks
- List of derecho events
- List of F4 and EF4 tornadoes
  - List of F4 and EF4 tornadoes (2020–present)
- List of tornadoes observed by mobile radars
- Tornado outbreak and derecho of April 1–3, 2024 – another significant severe weather event that happened less than two months earlier.
- List of United States tornadoes in May 2024
