= Warn-on-Forecast =

Severe weather prediction research

PDF fact-sheet on the Warn-on-Forecast program

Warn-on-Forecast (WoF or WoFS) is an ongoing numerical weather prediction research project being conducted by the National Severe Storms Laboratory (NSSL), a branch of the National Oceanic and Atmospheric Administration, designed to increase the lead time for tornado warnings, severe thunderstorm warnings, and flash flood warnings. WoFS is cloud-based and exclusively targets regions of severe weather to reduce computing expense.

== Prediction mechanisms ==
WoFS is a rapid refresh ensemble analysis forecast system. WoFS currently runs a 3-km, 5 min temporal resolution forecast that projects 3 to 6 hours into the future. A future configuration currently being prototyped is a 1km model. WoFS evolved out of the code from the High Resolution Rapid Refresh (HRRR) model.

Unlike HRRR, it is an ensemble forecast with 36 members, and the forecast is generated using 18 members. It uses an ensemble Kalman filter which allows for rapid assimilation of data every 15 minutes. While HRRR uses Thompson Aerosol Aware microphysics, WoFS uses NSSL Double Moment microphysics. An experimental HRRR Ensemble provides the boundary conditions for the WoFS model and WoFS adds additional observational data from GOES Cloud water/ice paths, radar, Mesonet, and other sources. This scheme is specifically tuned for the evolution of severe convective storms and the production of realistic hydrometeor distributions. WoFS allows for ensemble modelling of individual storms.

As computing resources are currently limited, the model is currently only operational in regions of high concern during periods of severe weather. The 2021 configuration used a square of 900km lengths. The model box can be moved anywhere within the HRRR bounding box which covers the United States and much of lower Canada.

Comparison of HRRR and WoFS Model Specifications
Feature / Specification	HRRR (state of the art single run)	WoFS (first of its kind ensemble)
WRF-based; RUC LSM; 36-member GSI-EnKF analysis; 3km grid spacing; 50 vertical levels	✓	✓
Radar reflectivity assimilated	✓	✓
Radar velocity assimilated		✓
GOES clear sky radiances	✓	✓
GOES CWP assimilated		✓
Multiple PBL Schemes		✓
Calibrated ML-based probabilities of individual hazards		✓
Microphysics	Thompson Aerosol Aware	NSSL Double Moment
Data assimilation cadence	60-min	15-min
Temporal resolution of output	15-min	5-min
Images per forecast run	~ 2,000	~ 20,000

WoFSCast performs AI emulation of WoFS, with encouraging results. It delivers results faster and thus can be used for larger domain, large ensemble count systems.

== Operational Applications ==
WoFS has been coupled with the Flooded Locations & Simulated Hydrographs (FLASH) Project as WoFS-FLASH, which enables enhanced prediction outputs of hydrographs and grid streamflow data.

== Timeline ==
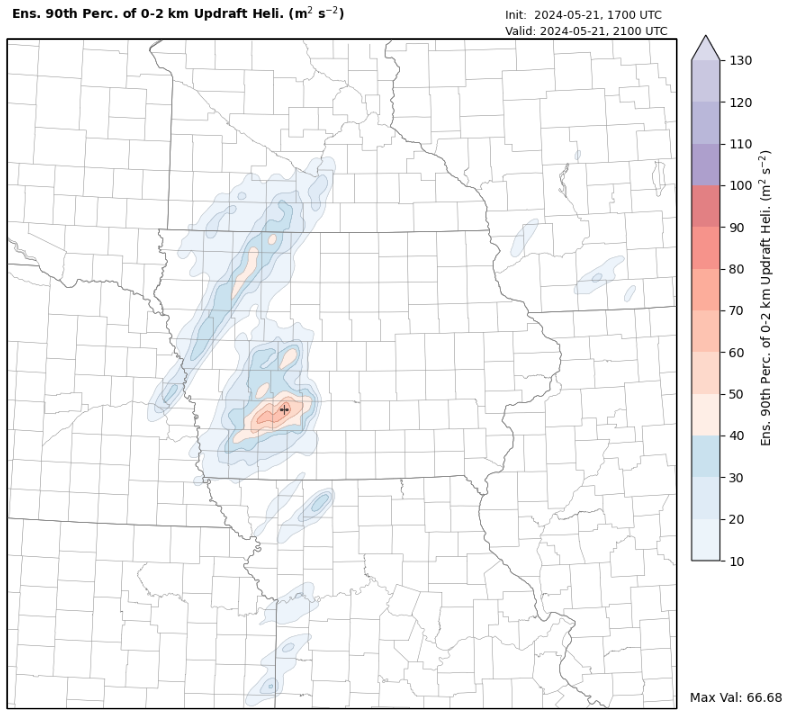
The Warn-on-Forecast run at 17z on May 21, 2024, showing a high probability of low-level updraft helicity near Adair County three hours before the Greenfield tornado formed

The research project was started in 2010 in the National Weather Center in Norman, Oklahoma.

On May 16, 2017, a deadly EF2 tornado struck Elk City, Oklahoma. Before the tornado formed, meteorologists at the National Weather Service Norman, Oklahoma (NWS Norman) office saw storms form in Texas. NSSL, who works in the same building as NWS Norman, had a meteorologist embedded with the NWS Norman meteorologists. The Warn-on-Forecast system, which was being monitored by the NSSL meteorologist, noted a high chance of a tornado occurring in the Elk City area well before the tornado occurred. As a result, the National Weather Service issued a Significant Weather Advisory which stated, “Severe weather is likely with these storms as they move into Oklahoma and there is a high probability that tornado warnings will be issued.” Following the advisory being issued, the Elk City Emergency Manager, Lonnie Risenhoover, activated the tornado sirens to warn residents of Elk City nearly 30 minutes before the tornado struck. NWS Norman subsequently issued a tornado warning for Elk City, which was in place 28 minutes before the tornado struck. This was the first time WoFS influenced real time tornado warnings from the National Weather Service.

In May 2018, tests were conducted alongside meteorologists at the NWS Norman office.

On May 21, 2024, a violent EF4 tornado struck the city of Greenfield, Iowa. A few weeks after the tornado, the National Oceanic and Atmospheric Administration released details about an experimental warning system which was tested before and during the tornado. This new warning system, named Warn-on-Forecast System (WoFS), was created by the Hazardous Weather Testbed housed in the National Weather Center in Norman, Oklahoma. During the experiment and test, the WoFS gave a high indication of “near-ground rotation” in and around the area of Greenfield, Iowa between 2-4 p.m. According to the press release, 75-minutes later, the violent EF4 tornado touched down. Scientists with the National Severe Storms Laboratory were able to give local National Weather Service forecasters a 75-minute lead time for the tornado.

The reintroduction of the TORNADO act into the 119th United States Congress includes the implementation of the Warn-on-Forecast system into normal forecasting operations, as prior to this it has only been used during large-scale severe weather events.

On April 4, 2025, Bloomberg and Axios reported that the website of the National Severe Storms Laboratory, which runs forecast models and hosts the Warn-on-Forecast cloud viewer, was set to be shut down at midnight on April 5 as a result of contract terminations at NOAA and a directive to NOAA to cut all IT-related spending by 50%. This was later pushed back to July 31, following a renewal of a contract with Amazon Web Services.
