= Unity, Clark County, Wisconsin =

Unity, Wisconsin
- Town
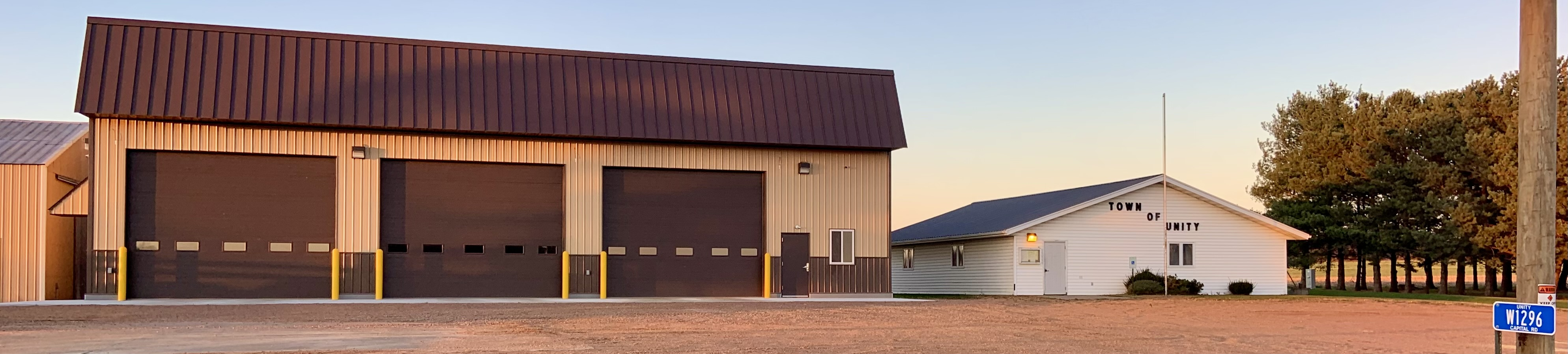
- Unity Town hall

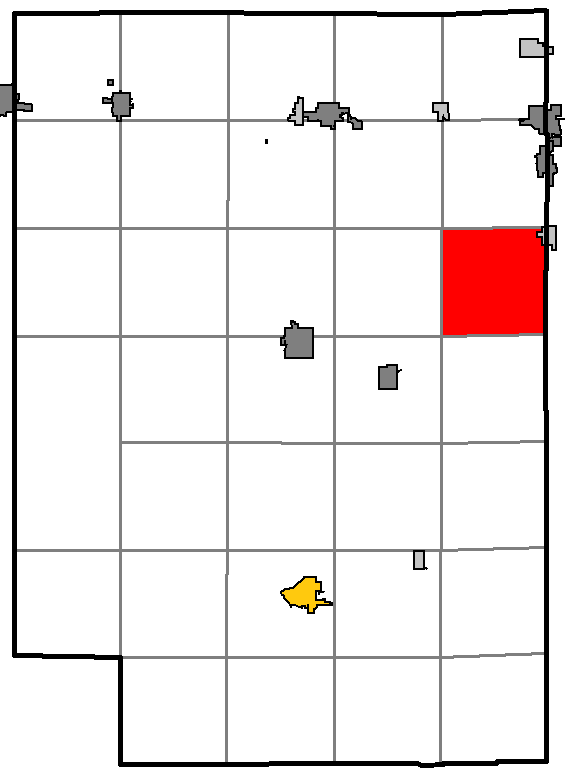
- Location of Unity, Clark County

- Location of Clark County, Wisconsin
- Coordinates: 44°48′45″N 90°22′51″W
- Country: United States
- State: Wisconsin
- County: Clark

Area
  - Total: 34.8 sq mi (90.2 km^{2})
  - Land: 34.8 sq mi (90.2 km^{2})
  - Water: 0 sq mi (0.0 km^{2})
- Elevation: 1,302 ft (397 m)

Population (2020)
  - Total: 751
  - Density: 21.6/sq mi (8.33/km^{2})
- Time zone: UTC-6 (Central (CST))
  - Summer (DST): UTC-5 (CDT)
- Area codes: 715 & 534
- FIPS code: 55-81825
- GNIS feature ID: 1584318

Unity is a town in Clark County in the U.S. state of Wisconsin. The population was 751 at the 2020 census. The Village of Unity is located partially within the town. The unincorporated community of Riplinger is also located in the town.

== Geography ==
According to the United States Census Bureau, the town has a total area of 34.8 square miles (90.2 km^{2}), all land.

== Demographics ==
As of the census of 2000, there were 745 people, 239 households, and 202 families residing in the town. The population density was 21.4 people per square mile (8.3/km^{2}). There were 253 housing units at an average density of 7.3 per square mile (2.8/km^{2}). The racial makeup of the town was 98.12% White, 1.34% Asian, 0.13% from other races, and 0.40% from two or more races. Hispanic or Latino of any race were 0.27% of the population.

There were 239 households, out of which 41.4% had children under the age of 18 living with them, 75.7% were married couples living together, 5.0% had a female householder with no husband present, and 15.1% were non-families. 11.7% of all households were made up of individuals, and 3.8% had someone living alone who was 65 years of age or older. The average household size was 3.12 and the average family size was 3.43.

In the town, the population was spread out, with 32.3% under the age of 18, 8.3% from 18 to 24, 29.8% from 25 to 44, 20.9% from 45 to 64, and 8.6% who were 65 years of age or older. The median age was 32 years. For every 100 females, there were 110.5 males. For every 100 females age 18 and over, there were 109.1 males.

The median income for a household in the town was $41,154, and the median income for a family was $42,500. Males had a median income of $27,237 versus $18,750 for females. The per capita income for the town was $13,252. About 14.4% of families and 15.5% of the population were below the poverty line, including 20.9% of those under age 18 and 4.9% of those age 65 or over.
