= Greenfield tornado =

2024 EF4 tornado in Iowa, U.S.

Coordinates: 41°18′4″N 94°27′34″W

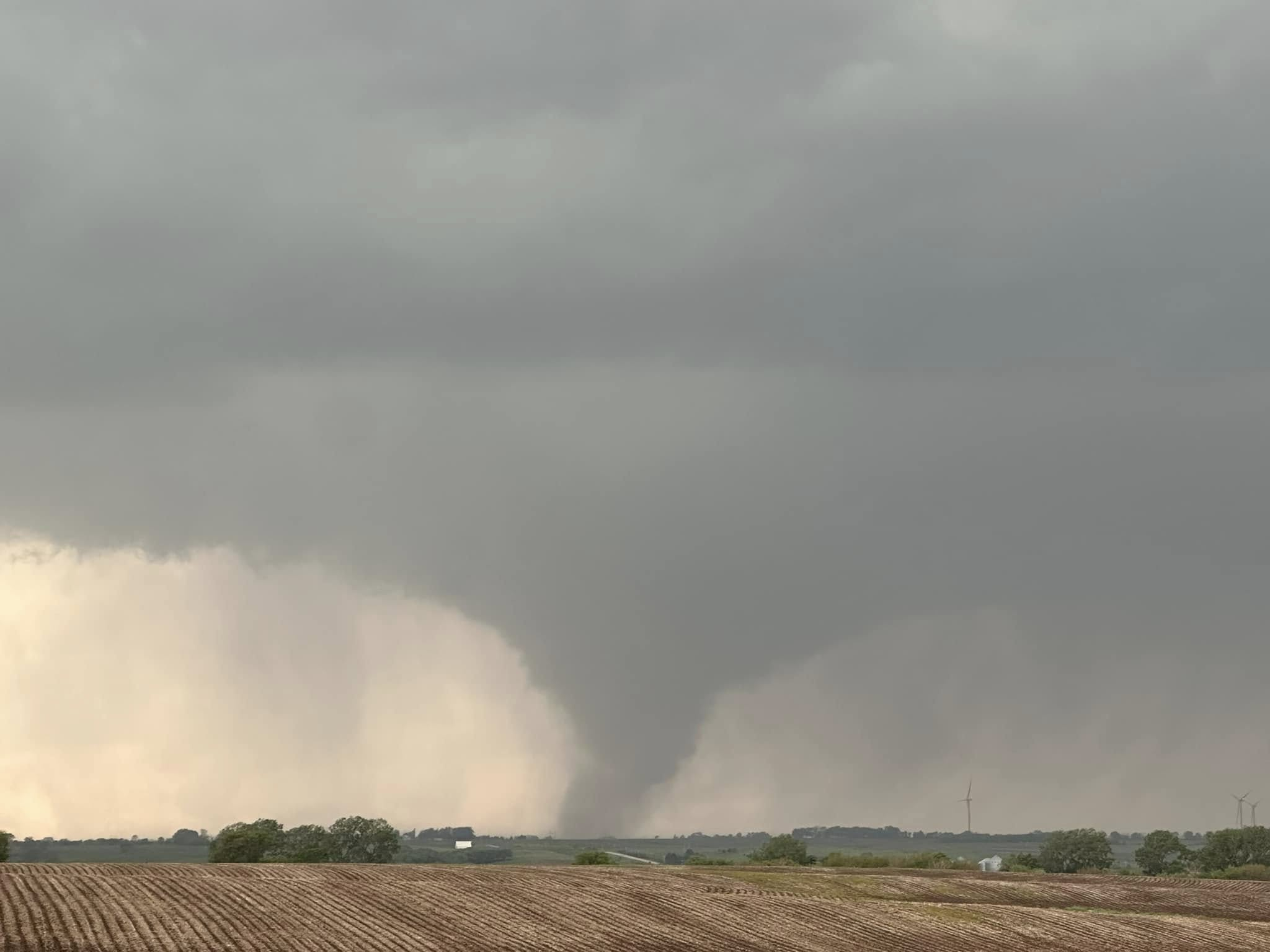
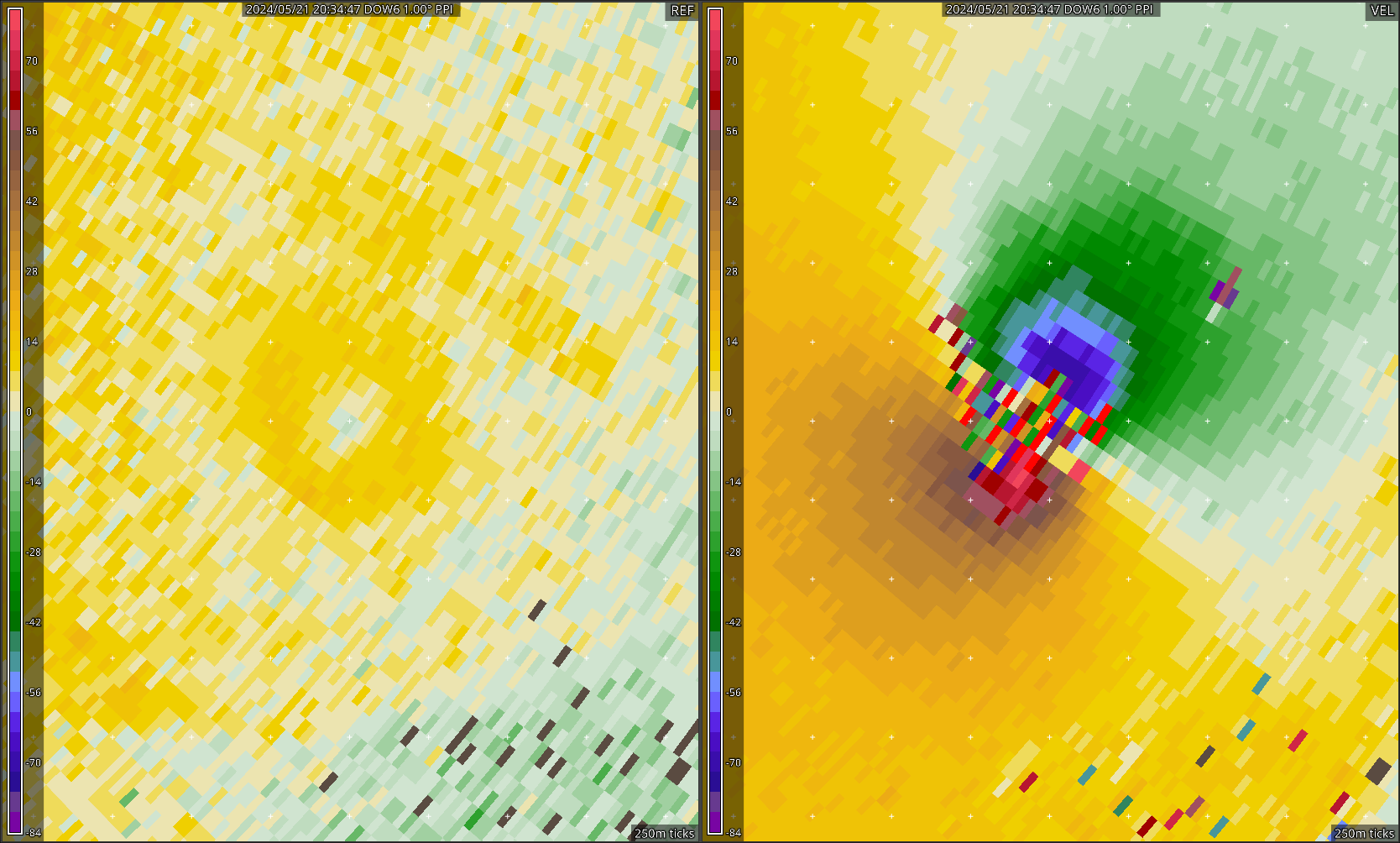
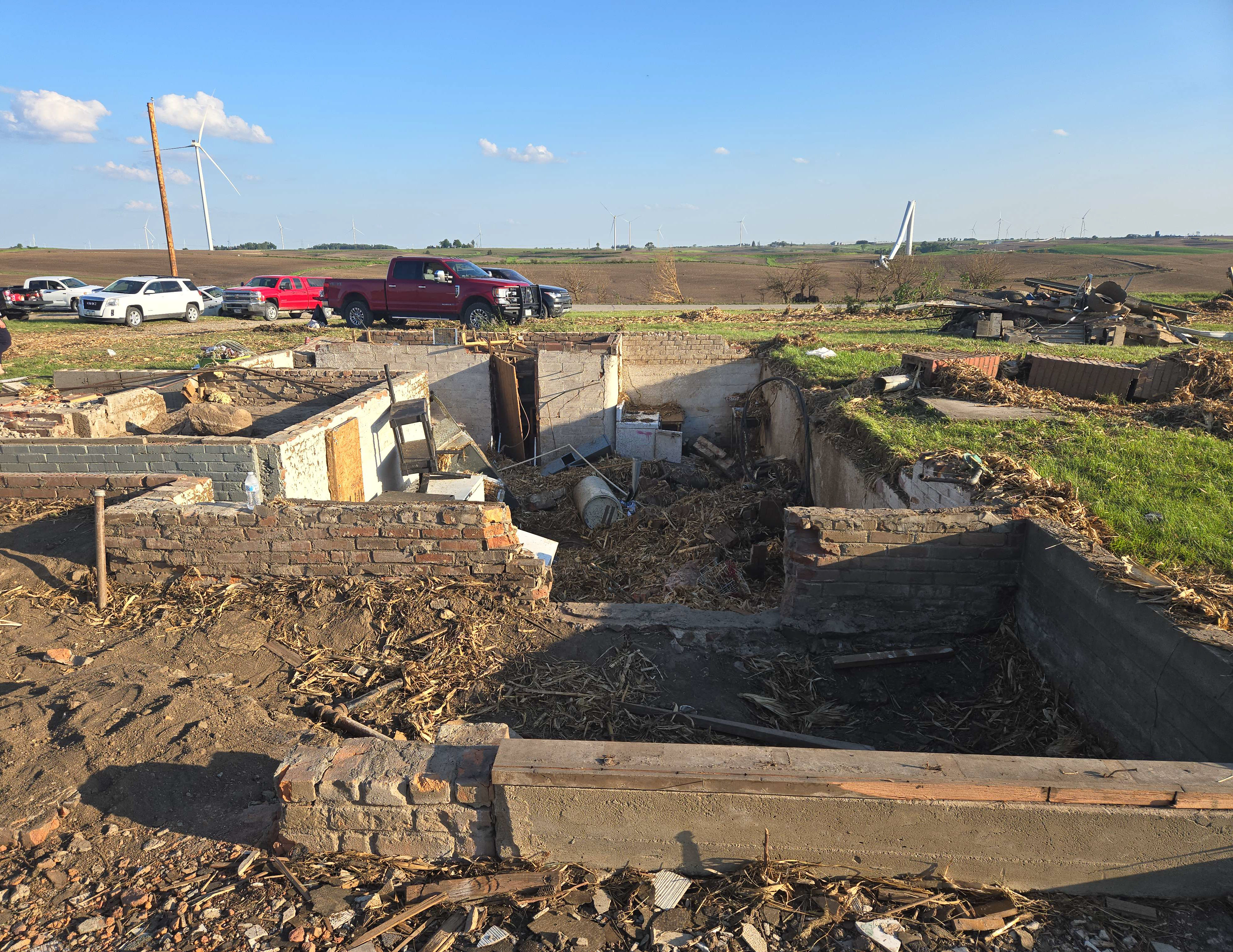
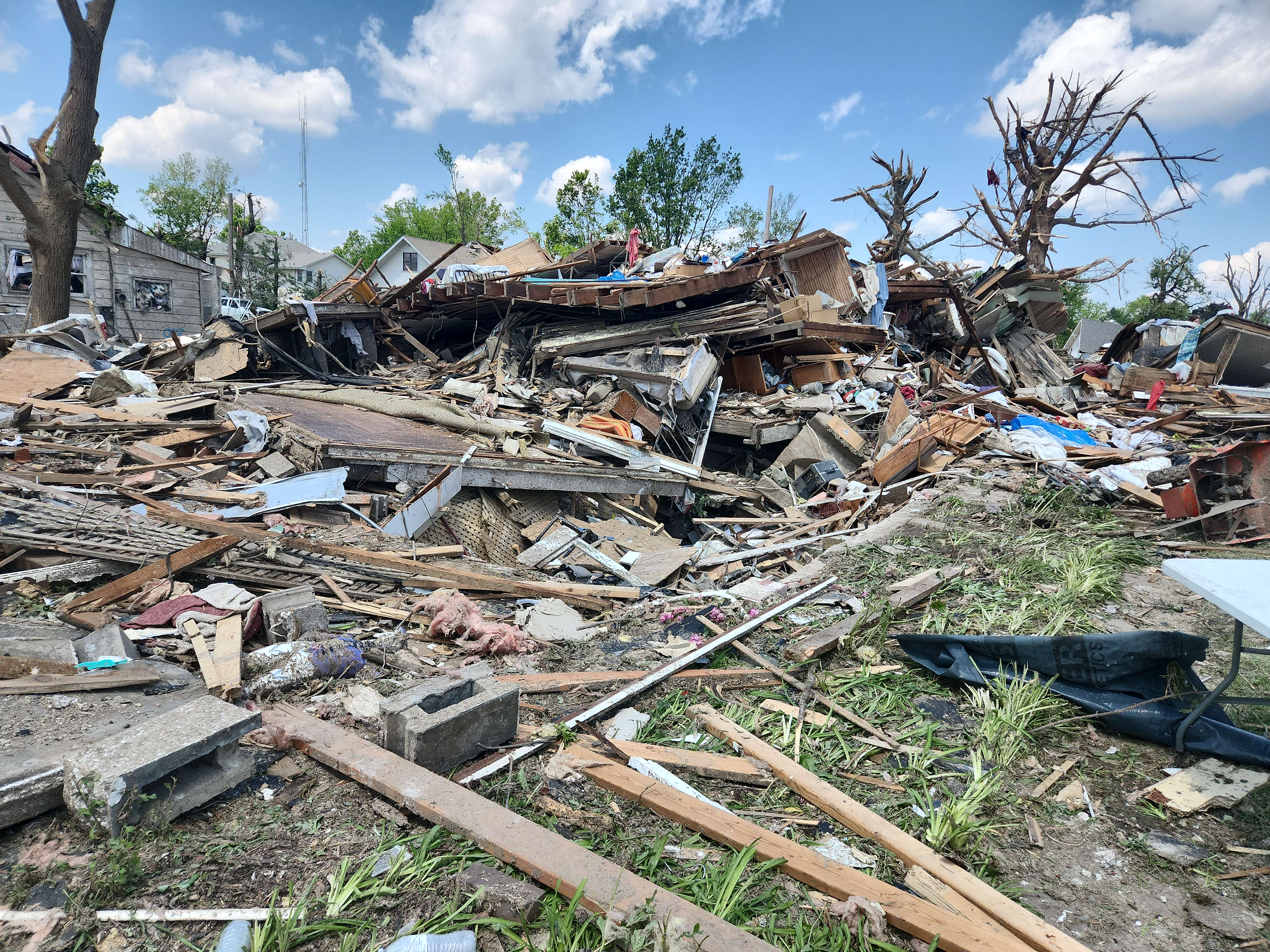
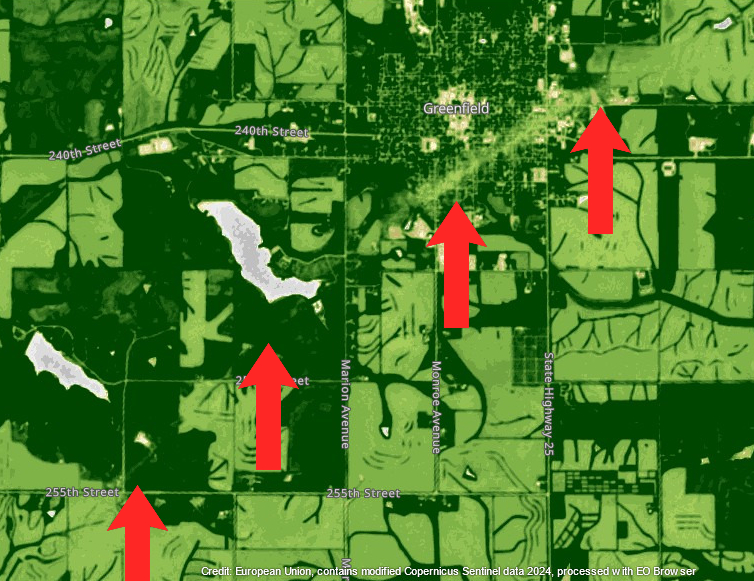
- Clockwise: The tornado as seen southwest of Greenfield, a farmhouse destroyed at EF4 intensity along 310th Street in rural Adair County, Sentinel-2 satellite imagery of Greenfield with a clear damage scar highlighted, an obliterated house in Greenfield, DOW6 radar imagery of the tornado.

Meteorological history
- Formed: May 21, 2024, 2:57 p.m. CDT (UTC−05:00)
- Dissipated: May 21, 2024, 3:45 pm. CDT (UTC−05:00)
- Duration: 48 minutes

EF4 tornado
- on the Enhanced Fujita scale
- Max width: 1,600 yards (0.91 mi; 1.5 km)
- Path length: 42.38 miles (68.20 km)
- Highest winds: Official intensity: 185 mph (298 km/h); Radar-estimated: 304 mph (489 km/h) (Third-highest worldwide; as estimated by Doppler on Wheels (DOW) radar)

Overall effects
- Fatalities: 5
- Injuries: 35
- Damage: $31–31.8 million Damage estimates: $31,800,000 (2024 USD) Per NOAA (NWS & NCEI)
- Areas affected: Page, Taylor, Adams, and Adair counties; especially Greenfield, Iowa, United States
- Part of the Tornado outbreak of May 19–22, 2024 and Tornadoes of 2024

On the afternoon of May 21, 2024, a violent and destructive tornado tracked across southwestern Iowa, United States, devastating the city of Greenfield. The tornado, known most commonly as the Greenfield tornado, destroyed many buildings and wind turbines across its path that stretched through Page, Taylor, Adams, and Adair counties, while also causing more than $31 million (Note: All monetary totals are in 2024 USD, unless noted otherwise) in property damage, killing five people and injuring 35 more. The tornado reached peak intensity within Greenfield, where National Weather Service surveyors denoted maximum wind speeds estimated at 185 mph (298 km/h), or EF4 on the Enhanced Fujita scale. However, estimated winds of 304 mph (489 km/h) were briefly determined from inside the tornado by a Doppler on Wheels portable radar unit, one of only three times that wind speeds exceeding 300 miles per hour (480 km/h) have been determined in a tornado from radar observations.

The tornado formed amidst a significant tornado outbreak in an area expected to be strongly conducive for the development of long-tracked and fast-moving tornadoes. Over the next 48 minutes, the tornado was observed by multiple storm chasers and research teams, who would determine the extreme wind figure from a direct radar measurement above the city of Greenfield. In addition to one fatality on a highway in Adams County, four fatalities occurred in Greenfield, with the damage in the city described as "horrific", as surveyors revealed damage consistent with a violent EF4 tornado, contradicting analysis of mobile radar data. The tornado has been noted as an important milestone in the practical efficacy of the Warn-on-Forecast system, which predicted tornadic activity in the vicinity of Greenfield about 75 minutes before the tornado reached the community. State legislation, introduced in the aftermath of the Greenfield and Minden tornadoes and passed in both that summer and the following year, would fund housing projects and disaster recovery programs throughout Iowa.

== Meteorological synopsis ==
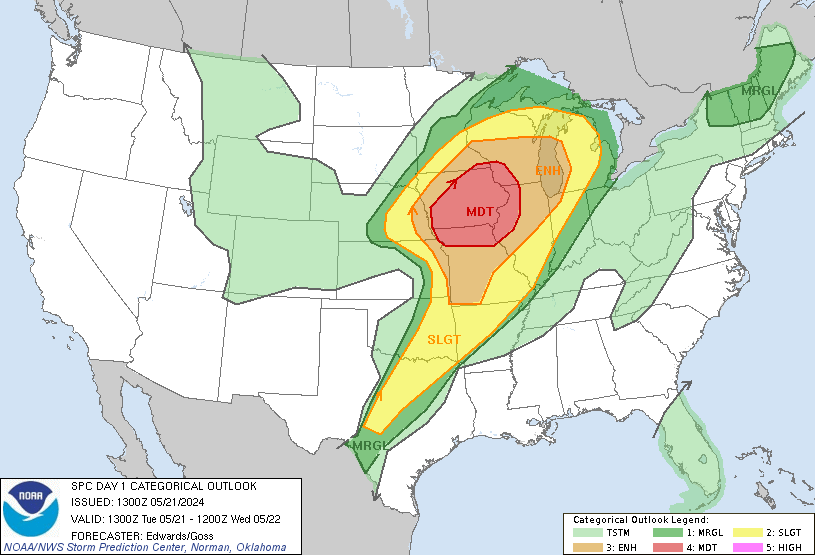
The Storm Prediction Center's Day 1 convective outlook for May 21, 2024, issued at 1300Z, indicating a moderate risk for severe weather over much of Iowa and nearby parts of Wisconsin, Illinois, Missouri, and southeastern Minnesota

On May 21, forecasters at the Storm Prediction Center issued a moderate (4/5) risk for severe weather over the states of Iowa, Missouri, Minnesota, Wisconsin, and Illinois, highlighting an elevated regional risk for tornadoes and strong wind gusts. Early on that morning, convective storms along a bow echo, a formation of storms associated with high winds, had formed along a boundary consisting of outflow from storm activity over western Nebraska. These storms were expected to move eastward through the southern third of Iowa, bringing a small risk of surface-based severe weather. To the north, a roughly west-to-east band of non-severe storms existed along a composite frontal and outflow boundary. North of this boundary existed a large area of rain showers that covered an area of dew points near 60 Fahrenheit and surface temperature in the lower 60s Fahrenheit. Dew points above 55 °F (13 °C) are typically considered more conducive to severe weather. These showers led to atmospheric stabilization, curtailing any severe risk north of the boundary. As the convection moved eastward out of the area, its severe risk was expected to lessen.

Later on that morning, a second severe weather threat developed as a large surface low-pressure trough had appeared over the Midwest, primarily centered over north-central Kansas, with a secondary and weaker low center near the tri-point of South Dakota, Iowa, and Minnesota. A warm front extended from the southern low center to the northeast through southeastern Nebraska and over southern Iowa, creating a large warm sector. A cold front anchored by the same low center extended southeast through central Kansas into the Oklahoma panhandle. The primary surface low was expected to move quickly to the northeast, moving the warm sector bounded by the warm front further north into east-central to southeastern Nebraska and west-central to southwestern Iowa, where atmospheric conditions conducive to severe weather would develop. Strong vertical ascent brought by the shortwave trough led to probable elevated thunderstorms over the central Nebraska/Kansas border, which would contribute to a surface-based storm system as they approached the Nebraska/Iowa border region. These surface-based storms were expected to develop into fast-moving supercells capable of producing severe weather hazards.

Early in the afternoon, the southern low center had moved to southeastern Nebraska. The warm front was expected to rapidly move northward ahead of the shortwave trough, which would bring higher dew points in the upper 60s Fahrenheit into much of Iowa. In conjunction with this, a large change in temperatures with altitude hallmarked by steep mid-level lapse rates, and mid-level CAPE values of 2500–3500 j/kg, a measure of atmospheric instability approximating the power thunderstorm updrafts have to rise, in addition to powerful wind fields producing elongated hodographs, a measure indicative of a shift in wind speed with height that allows the development of rotating thunderstorms, were expected to be present in the region throughout the early afternoon. These factors would result in an environment very conducive to significant and fast-moving severe thunderstorms. The storm mode was initially expected to be discrete, with fast-moving individual storms staying ahead of the cold front in the severe-conducive warm sector. These storms were expected to quickly develop the characteristics of severe supercell thunderstorms, with strong wind gusts up to 75 mph (121 km/h), very large hail up to 3 in (7.6 cm), and strong and long-lasting tornadoes all being possible hazards.

A particularly dangerous situation level of tornado watch was issued at 1:10 p.m. CDT over much of Iowa and parts of surrounding states. All severe weather hazards were expected as the risk of "[s]everal tornadoes and a few intense tornadoes" would exist over a large region, including Adair County. The watch outlined a 90% chance of two or more tornadoes, with an 80% chance of one or more tornadoes significant on the Enhanced Fujita scale (EF2–EF5) in the watch area.

== Tornado summary ==
=== Formation through Adams County ===
The tornado first touched down at the intersection of 110th Street and Vine Avenue in rural Page County, Iowa at 2:57 p.m. Central Daylight Time (UTC–5). Across Page County, damage up to EF1 intensity occurred, restricted primarily to tree branches, while the roof of a farm outbuilding was torn off. It then briefly tracked through the far northwestern tip of Taylor County, causing no damage, before moving into Adams County, where damage occurred to trees, power poles and farm buildings past the county border. The tornado intensified as it passed through rural areas to the southeast of Nodaway, before crossing US 34 north of Brooks, where numerous videos displayed the tornado's large funnel with an area of swirling debris below. The tornado then crossed Iowa 148, where 41-year-old Monica Irma Zamarron was killed after she was ejected from her vehicle after being caught in the tornado's circulation. The tornado began producing more EF2 damage past this point, before producing EF3 damage at the intersection of 150th Street and Notchwood Avenue, where an unanchored home lost its walls and slid off its foundation, while all nearby outbuildings were destroyed. Throughout the rest of Adams County, the tornado caused damage to multiple wind turbines, many of which collapsed, while reaching a maximum width in the county of 1,300 yd (1,200 m) and exhibiting multiple suction vortices each producing damage.

=== Adair County ===
Still of drone footage captured of Greenfield tornado after taking down a wind turbine, taken by Reed Timmer

The tornado then crossed into Adair County, still with multiple-vortex characteristics, while downing a wind turbine and a metal truss tower. The tornado then approached Fontanelle Road, where it destroyed a well-anchored home at EF4 intensity with the debris thrown into a nearby field. An outbuilding on the property was completely obliterated, although the farm equipment was mostly unmoved and not severely damaged, and trees were shredded. Northeast of there on 310th Street, a nailed down cinderblock foundation home and an outbuilding were obliterated and swept away. Vehicles inside the garage of the home were damaged, but not tossed, while debris from the structures and vehicles within it were left straddling along the sides of the foundation. The tornado then moved back over open terrain, inflicting damage to an outbuilding, which was rated EF1, before downing more wind turbines. Low-end EF4 damage was observed as the tornado crossed 290th Street, where another home was leveled.

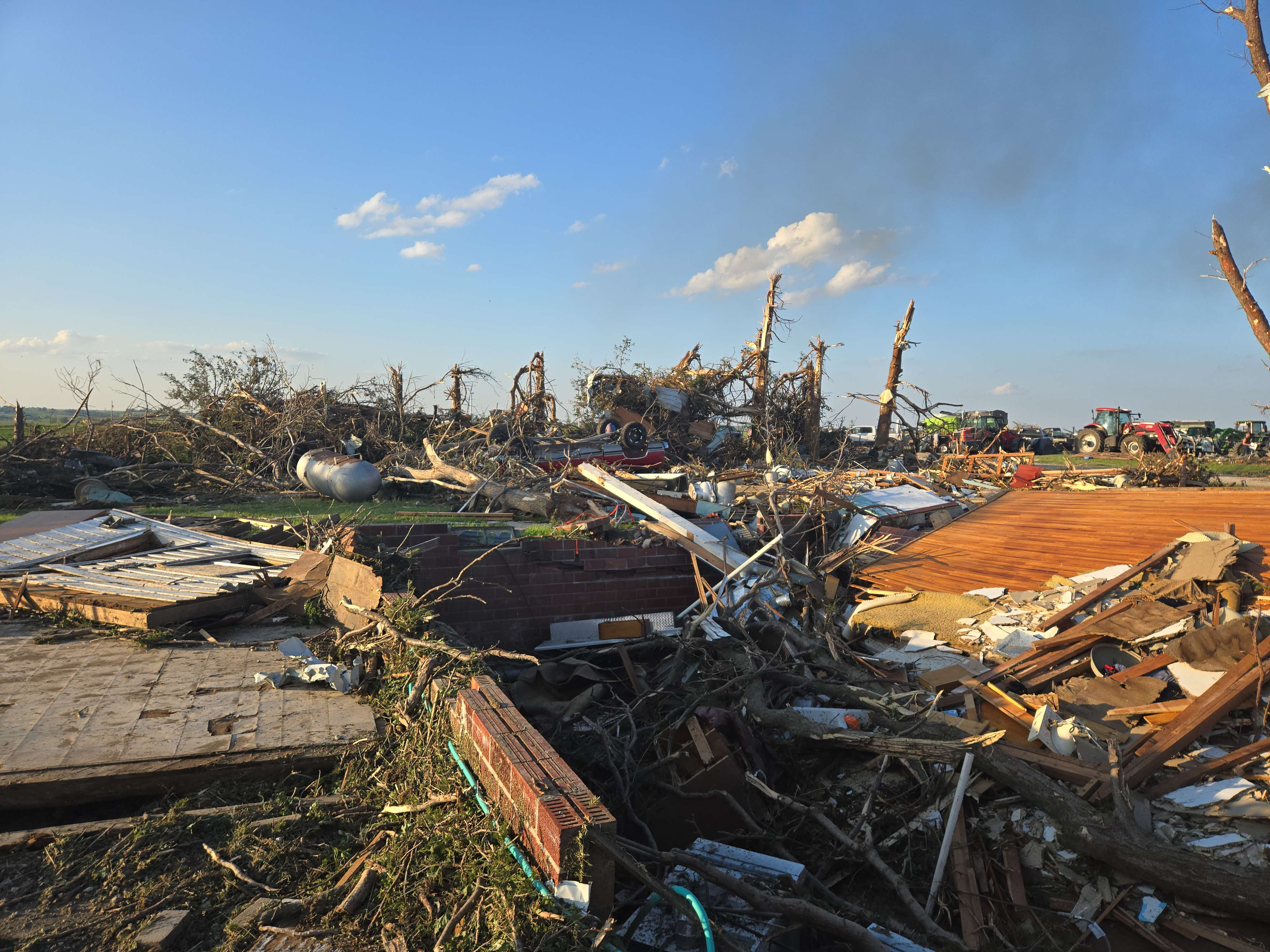
A farmhouse destroyed at EF4 intensity along Jordan Avenue south of Fontanelle

Crossing Jordan Avenue, the violent tornado leveled another home, while overturning a vehicle, and throwing another into a tree line. A nearby home was also mostly destroyed at EF3 intensity, and more trees were snapped, with several experiencing partial debarking. The tornado then moved through another wind farm, collapsing additional wind turbines. As the tornado approached Greenfield from the southwest, it tossed vehicles at EF2 intensity and destroyed two homes at EF3 intensity, with EF1 damage to roofs and outbuildings also occurring. Right before entering Greenfield, the tornado passed over Nodaway Park Ponds where two outbuildings were destroyed, and another home suffered roof damage at EF2 intensity.

==== Greenfield and dissipation ====
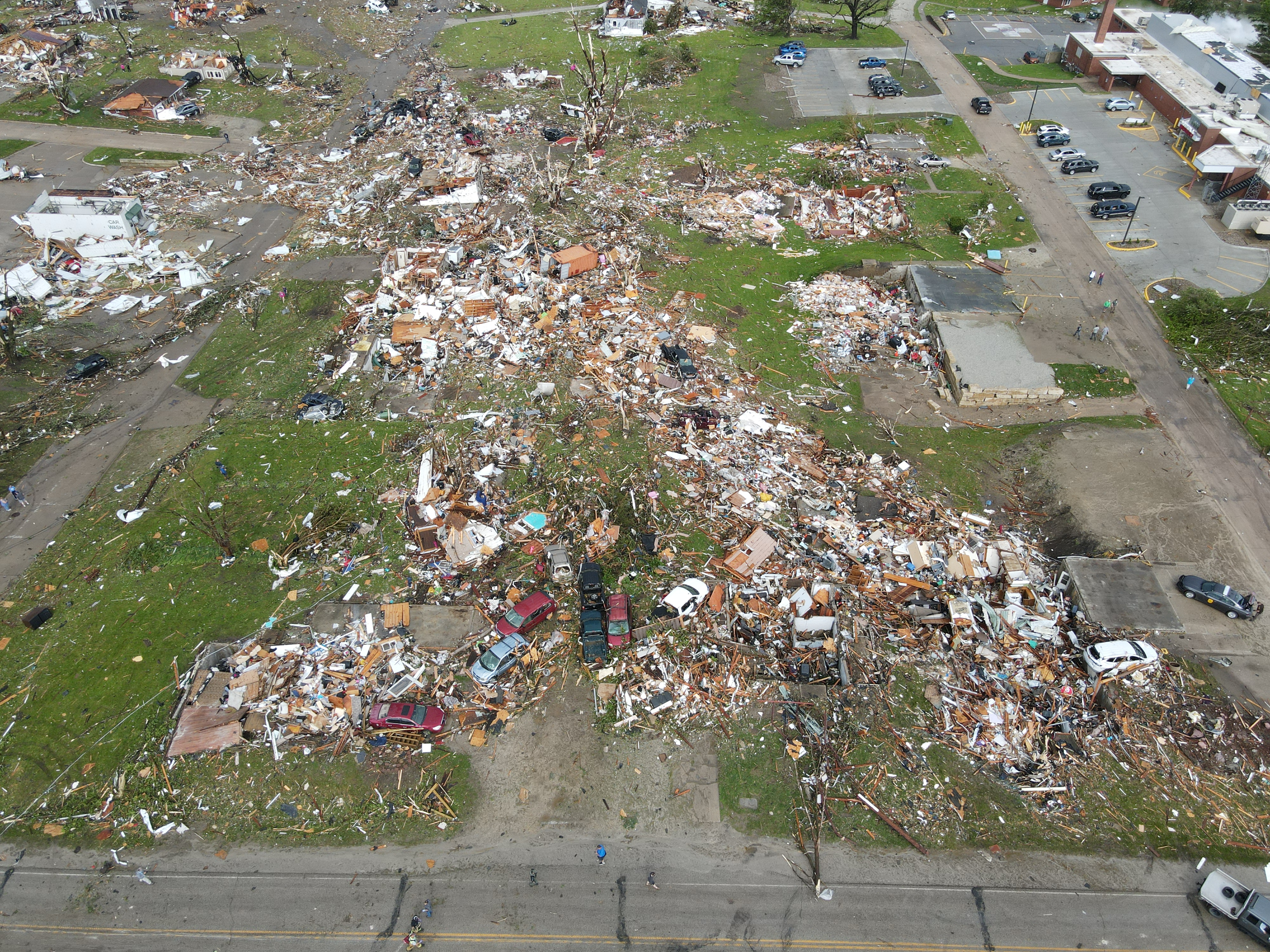
Aerial imagery of EF4 damage to houses in northeastern Greenfield, Iowa. Peak wind speeds were estimated at 170 mph (270 km/h) here.

The tornado then entered the southwest part of Greenfield, and began producing EF4-scale damage again, reaching its peak intensity of mid-range EF4 shortly after it entered the town. Dozens of homes were leveled with some homes being partially swept away, and mobile homes and outbuildings were obliterated. The most intense damage occurred when a well-built home was obliterated and swept away. The estimated wind speed at this location was 185 mph (298 km/h). Many other homes suffered extensive roof and exterior wall damage, and many large trees were snapped and stubbed, including some that landed on and contributed to houses being leveled. The tornado then produced high-end EF3 damage to the southeast side of town, continuing to heavily damage homes, including some that were leveled or shifted off their foundations, and obliterating mobile homes, as well as snapping large trees. The tornado then produced low-end EF4 damage on the eastern side of town near the intersection of Iowa 92 and Iowa 25. More homes were leveled, shifted off their foundations, or suffered severe roof and exterior wall damage. It also heavily damaged or destroyed more outbuildings and stubbed additional trees. All throughout the town, vehicles were destroyed and wooden power poles were snapped as well. Four elderly people were killed and 35 other people were injured in the town. The Adair County hospital suffered significant damage with lab and testing equipment being destroyed and hallways flooded. Catherine Hillestad, CEO of the hospital, stated that "[h]ad that tornado been any closer to our hospital or hit us directly, this entire building would be gone", referring to the fact that the hospital was very close to some of the tornado's most intense damage. Beyond that point, the tornado weakened as it continued northeastward before dissipating at 3:45 p.m. Central Daylight Time (UTC–5). The tornado was rated EF4 on the Enhanced Fujita scale with wind speeds estimated at 185 mph (298 km/h), reaching a peak width of 1,300 yards (1,200 m) along a 42.38-mile (68.20 km) path, remaining on the ground for 48 minutes. Five fatalities occurred overall, along with 35 injuries.

Another EF2 tornado formed from the same storm that produced the Greenfield tornado as it was dissipating, which tracked an additional 11.87 miles (19.10 km) through northeastern Adair County.

== Observation and research ==
=== Storm chasers and DOW observation ===
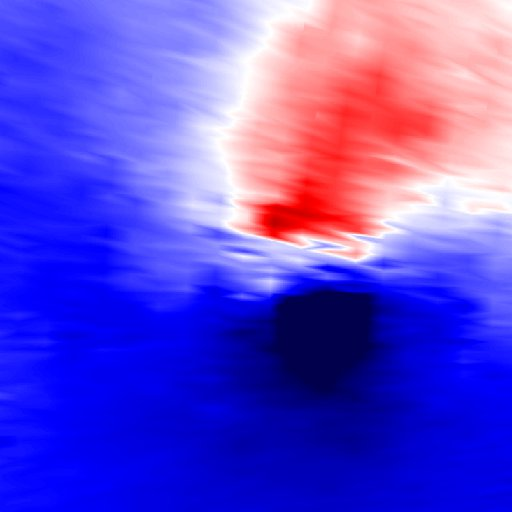
Raw DOW7 imagery of the tornado's ground-adjusted wind speeds at 3:41:08 p.m. at peak intensity

Storm chaser and meteorologist Reed Timmer captured close-range drone footage of the tornado destroying multiple wind turbines over rural Iowa. While he attempted to chase and intercept tornadoes in Iowa that day in the SRV Dominator, it encountered a mechanical issue while driving in Kansas, and Timmer's team used a rental car to follow the tornado. In a review of footage from the remotely operated drone, Timmer stated that pressure readings inside of the tornado were likely over 100 mb (100 hPa) below its surroundings; that subvortices of the tornado may have orbited the parent circulation at speeds close to 200 mph (320 km/h) and could have destroyed the SRV Dominator if it was used to intercept the storm; and that wind speeds inside of these subvortices "could even reach about 400 miles per hour (640 km/h), or even approach the speed of sound", though these figures were not directly recorded.

Engineer and meteorologist Timothy P. Marshall stated while analyzing footage of the storm destroying wind turbines that the way in which the storm destroyed the turbine's blades could be used as reference for a future damage indicator for the Enhanced Fujita scale. Chicago & Midwest Storm Chasers released a video of an aerial drone survey of Greenfield shortly after the tornado struck.

A research team headed by Joshua Wurman and Karen Kosiba of the Flexible Array of Radars and Mesonets research team observed the Greenfield tornado with a myriad of observational instruments. The first unit to start observations was a Doppler on Wheels (DOW) portable radar unit that had set up several miles west of Greenfield after briefly observing the tornado to their southwest. A separate crew proceeded deploy a pod of observational instruments in the direct path of the tornado for data collection, while a second Doppler on Wheels unit arrived in Greenfield at 3:30 p.m. and stationed themselves roughly 300 yd (270 m) away from the ultimate path of the tornado around 1 mile east of the center of the community. As the tornado struck Greenfield, this DOW unit experienced wind gusts of 80 mph (130 km/h) at their point of observation, while a weaker tornado formed directly overhead the DOW vehicle operated by Kosiba. The other DOW unit West of Greenfield noted small debris falling in the fields around their vehicle during this time.

The main tornado narrowed in width on approach to Greenfield, being described as "unusually small" as it tracked through the town, and a very brief wind gust of 263–271 mph (423–436 km/h) was briefly measured at a height of 44 meters (144 ft), which translated to an instantaneous gust of 304 mph (489 km/h) when adjusted to a ground level estimation. This extreme figure likely was experienced for less than a second, and has been described as one of the highest wind speed figures on Earth. This was one of only three observations of wind speeds exceeding 300 mph (480 km/h) inside of a tornado, alongside the 1999 Bridge Creek–Moore tornado and the 2013 El Reno tornado. Pieter Groenemeijer, the director of the European Severe Storms Laboratory, stated in reference to the Greenfield tornado's initial DOW measurement that "on the IF-scale, 250 mph measured below 60 m above ground level is IF4 on the IF-scale, 290 mph is IF5."

=== Damage analysis ===
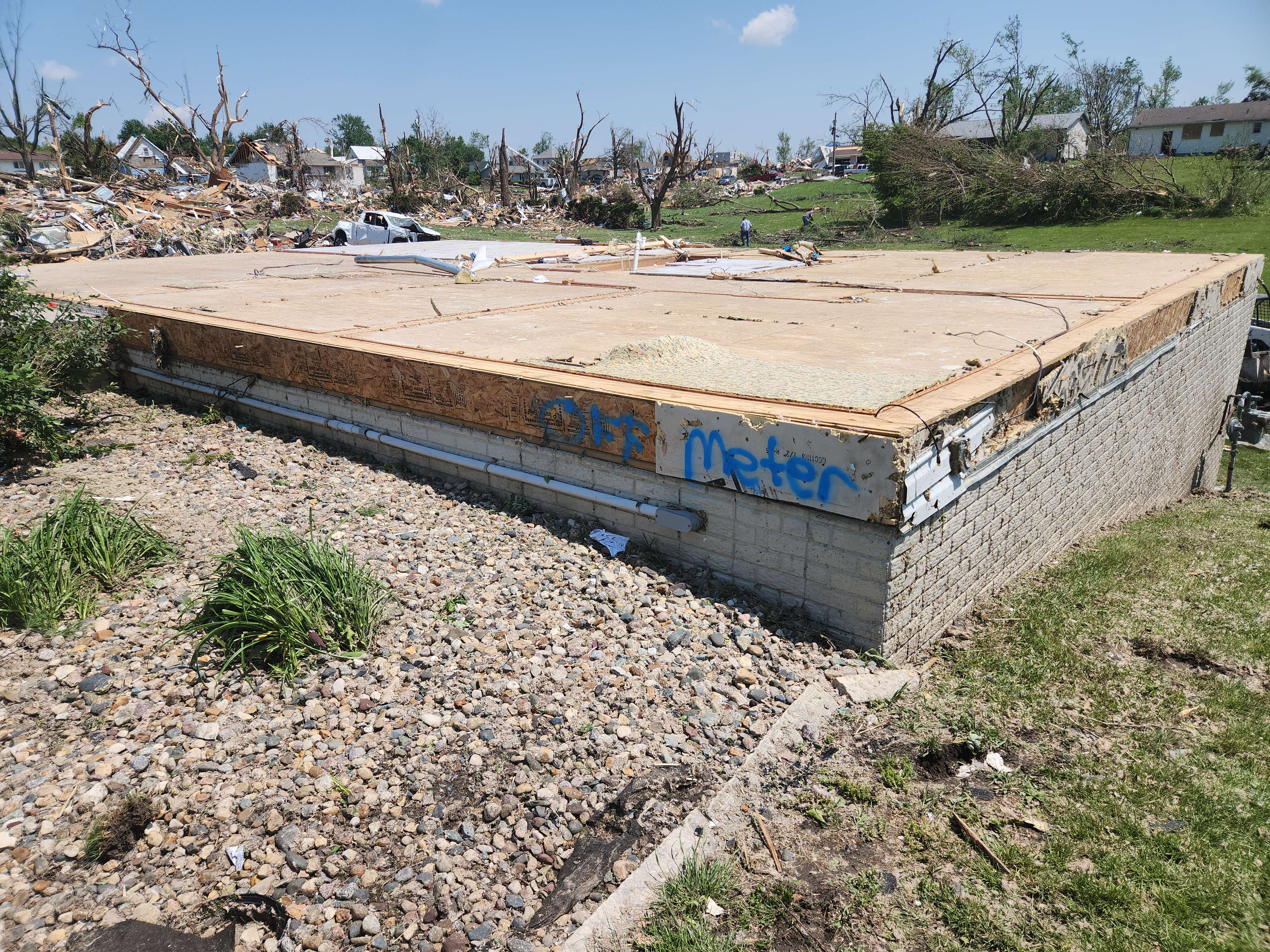
The highest rated damage in Greenfield was to an engineered or well-constructed home on SE 2nd Street, which was swept cleanly off its foundation

The most intense damage produced by the tornado was surveyed around 12:17 p.m. on May 22 by the National Weather Service office in Des Moines, Iowa, which was an engineered or well constructed residence that was destroyed with its slab swept clean. The damage was consistent with a peak wind speed of 185 miles per hour (298 km/h). After the Flexible Array of Radars and Mesonets team released their extreme wind estimate, which disagreed with their survey, Des Moines television station WHO-DT reached out to various individuals for comment about the Enhanced Fujita scale and damage assessment in Greenfield. Bill Gallus, a professor of meteorology at Iowa State University, stated that wind measurements are collected on very few tornadoes and are therefore too inconsistently taken to be included in the final rating. Chad Hahn, a Warning Coordination Meteorologist at National Weather Service Des Moines, stated that the damage in Greenfield did not support a rating consistent with the wind estimate, but did believe such a wind gust was possible. Jimmie Schultz, the mayor of Greenfield, stated that the wind estimate and damage surveys ignored the reality that many suffered incredible personal loss due to the tornado:

"No matter what wind speed, all that other stuff. It was a vicious tornado that come through here and a lot people(sic) lost everything. You know, I mean, a few lost their lives, but most of them lost everything."

In a presentation discussing the findings during the Greenfield event by Wurman and Kosiba, the disconnect between wind speed and ground damage was discussed, with one suggestion stating that aerial wind speeds could be disrupted by housing and other structures at ground level that could have prevented them from producing damage, in addition to the tornado's fast forward speed of 45 miles per hour (72 km/h) that caused the tornado to spend less than one minute in Greenfield.

=== Warn-on-Forecast ===
The National Severe Storms Laboratory used the Warn-on-Forecast system, an experimental forecasting tool using models and machine learning to predict individual storms, predicted a high probability of extremely strong surface level rotation in the vicinity of Greenfield over a full hour before the tornado began. This information was shared with National Weather Service forecasters across Iowa to assist in their warning-issuing operations. Forecasters had been discussing the implications of the Warn-on-Forecast output internally around 75 minutes before the tornado struck Greenfield. Increasing meteorological lead times before the onset of severe conditions is the goal of the program which aims to reduce losses of life and economic damages from severe weather events.

== Aftermath ==
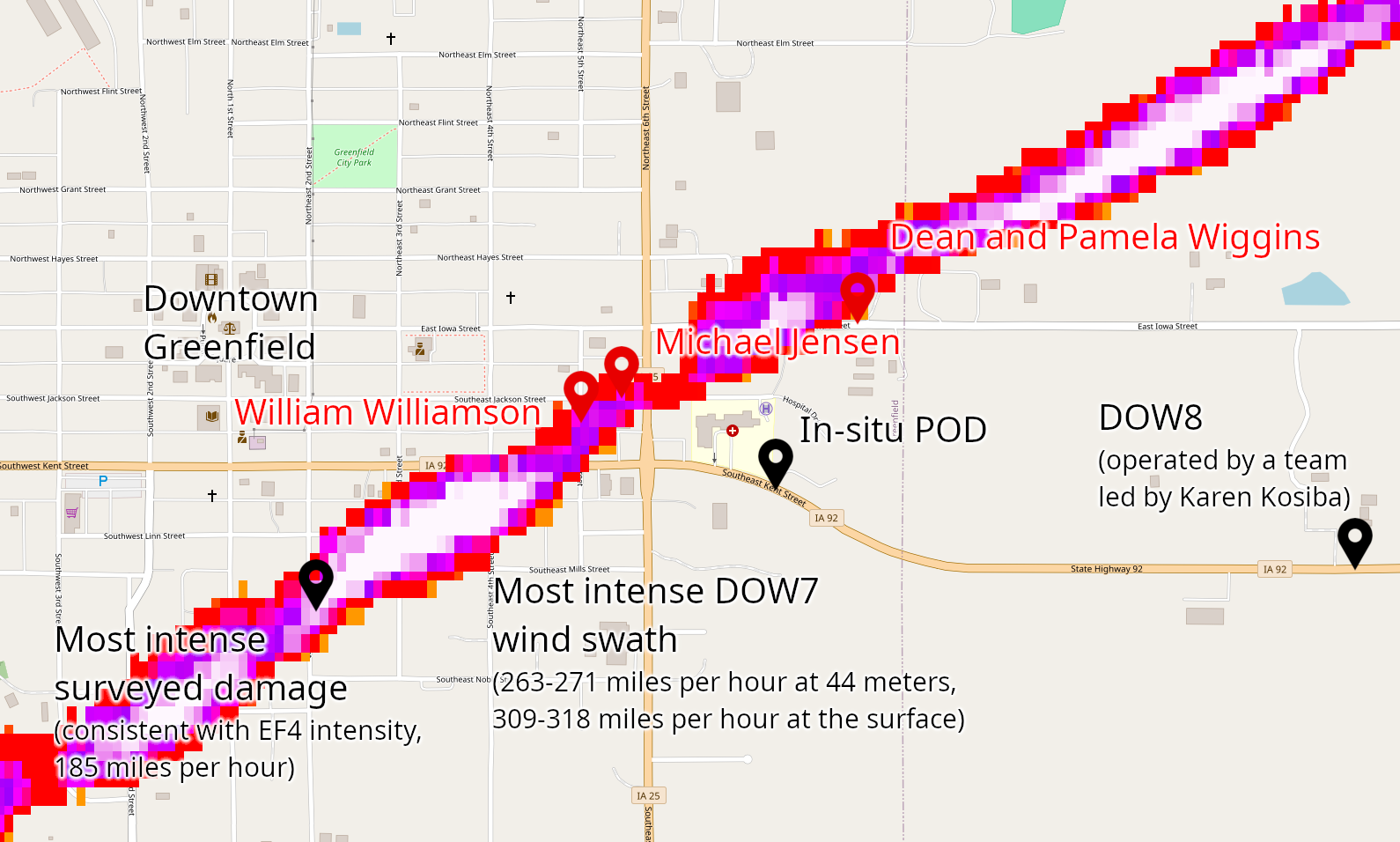
Map of Greenfield overlaid with peak DOW7 velocity data, the location of DOW8 and the team's in situ instruments, and peak surveyed damage

In the hours following the tornado, emergency personnel as well as storm chasers rushed into Greenfield to provide aid. Surrounding communities such as Red Oak quickly responded in Greenfield, with aid also coming from communities on the borders of Nebraska and Missouri. The local St. John's Catholic Church was designated a central meal site, collection and distribution site for donatoins, using their parking lot as a center for volunteers, meals and meal distribution, and donation collection, organization, and distribution. In a press conference later that day, Iowa State Patrol held a press conference in Adair County, which also included the announcements of a one-day curfew in Greenfield and the establishment of security checkpoints to get into town, with only residents being allowed to enter in the immediate aftermath. Volunteers from the Y'all Squad, a non-profit established by YouTube weather presenter Ryan Hall, Y'all, entered Greenfield to assist immediate recovery efforts hours after the tornado. Hall's audience also raised $93,000 in recovery funds in the hours after the storm.

The tornado's damage scar through Greenfield was visible on satellite imagery. Due to a timely response, 50% of the town's electric service was restored by the morning of May 24.

A resident of Greenfield, after being the subject of a viral news broadcast of them losing golf equipment in the tornado, received new golf clubs and an invitation to play in the John Deere Classic mini Pro-Am.

Maize began growing in Greenfield and surrounding areas in the months following the tornado. This was attributed to the tornado carrying seeds into the town, some of which may have come from grain silos, with heavy rain following the tornado also contributing to the volunteer, or naturally planted, crop's growth. The tornado struck during the time of year when maize seeds are typically planted. Many likely failed to germinate before the tornado struck, before being pulled out from the ground and brought to Greenfield.

The RAGBRAI bicycle tour stopped in Greenfield on July 23, 2024. The Greenfield Chamber of Commerce estimated that participants in the tour had raised between $50,000–60,000 in funds that would go towards tornado recovery.

By November 2024, six months following the tornado, the Greater Greenfield Community Foundation, a group intending to assist residents of the city recover, had raised a total of $1 million. Jeremy Cooper, the emergency manager of Adair County, stated that 51 building permits had been issued, with 34 homes under active construction.

On May 9, 2025, a memorial to victims, volunteers, and first responders of the tornado was unveiled by citizens of Greenfield. The one-year commemoration of the event is scheduled to occur on May 21, 2025, with organizers of the event describing the recovery in the city as "phenomenal".

The tornado outbreak was the subject of "Terrifying Twin Twisters", the sixth episode of Season 2 of the Discovery Channel series In the Eye of the Storm, which originally aired on September 1, 2025.

=== Legislative impact ===
Governor of Iowa Kim Reynolds toured the damage the following day, describing the views as "horrific". Reynolds stated that personnel from Federal Emergency Management Agency (FEMA) were in Greenfield, who would be coordinating local and state recovery personnel. FEMA administrator Deanne Criswell, who had been working with a team in Minden, another rural Iowa community that was impacted by an EF3 tornado weeks prior, visited Greenfield on May 23 alongside Reynolds to assess damage and determine whether or not the area qualified for federal assistance, with Reynolds submitting an application for an expedited presidential disaster declaration the day prior. On May 24, president Joe Biden approved Reynolds' request for federal assistance and issued a major disaster declaration for Adair County and other counties that had experienced severe weather on May 21.

On July 11, 2024, Reynolds submitted the Disaster Recovery Temporary Housing Program to FEMA, which would establish a state-controlled program to provide federal funding for recreational vehicles and modular homes as temporary housing for disaster victims. On July 15, the State Disaster Recovery New Housing Grant and Disaster Recovery Housing Assistance was launched, a $10 million grant program to developers of single family, duplex, and townhouse units in counties where FEMA individual assistance funds are available.

Governor Reynolds' Condition of the State speech in January 2025 introduced and emphasized proposals for improving Iowa's capacity for disaster relief in response to the Minden and Greenfield tornadoes the year prior, in addition to other severe weather events. The proposals specifically focused on rehabilitation of families with destroyed houses and the removal of homes and structures damaged by severe weather. On April 22, 2025, Reynolds signed into law Senate File 619, a law focused on disaster relief. The law put forward $11.6 million towards the state's Disaster Recovery Housing Assistance Program, with $2 million going towards the Nuisance Property and Abandoned Building Fund for removing structures irreparably damaged by severe weather events. In addition, the law introduced the Natural Hazard Mitigation Financing program, a loan program to fund "ongoing risk mitigation" projects in Iowa communities through the Iowa Department of Homeland Security and Emergency Management.

In 2025, in an interview with Little Village, Bill Gallus of the National Weather Service office in Des Moines drew attention to recent funding cuts at NOAA that had affected multiple surrounding offices, including an indefinite cessation of weather balloon launches from the Omaha, Nebraska office. While during the Greenfield event, he had been concerned over the lack of a weather balloon launch from Omaha, their model had still been accurate, but forthcoming, less accurate data for weather modeling and staff cutbacks may lead to hindered forecasting efforts, predicting that forecasters may only have "three minutes of warning instead of 15", which may significantly reduce the amount of civilian lead time before the onset of severe weather.

=== Fatalities ===
Name	Age	Type of structure	Location	Additional notes	Reference
Monica Irma Zamarron	49	Motor vehicle	Iowa Highway 148 in Adams County	Initial reports stated that Zamarron may have been a storm chaser, but this was later rebuked by a family member.	
William Williamson	70	Permanent home	South 5th Street in Greenfield	Williamson was rescued from his home but died of his injuries. One of Williamson's two dogs also died.	
Michael Jensen	73	Permanent home	Southeast Jackson Street in Greenfield		
Pamela Wiggins	77	Permanent home	800 block of Iowa Street in Greenfield	Pamela and Dean Wiggins were a married couple who died when the tornado struck their home north of the hospital in Greenfield.	
Dean Wiggins	78	Permanent home	800 block of Iowa Street in Greenfield	Pamela and Dean Wiggins were a married couple who died when the tornado struck their home north of the hospital in Greenfield.	

== See also ==
- List of F4 and EF4 tornadoes (2020–present)
- Tornado records
- Mobile radar observation of tornadoes
- Research on tornadoes in 2024
