= Ryan Hall, Y'all =

American YouTuber and TikToker (born 1994)

- Born: Ryan Keith Hall; March 9, 1994 (age 32); Pikeville, Kentucky, U.S.
- Education: Mississippi State University (no degree received)
- Occupation: YouTuber
- Spouse: Stephanie Thacker (m. 2019)
- Children: 3

YouTube information
- Channels: Ryan Hall, Y'all; Yallbot; The Y'all Squad
- Years active: 2021–present
- Genre: Weather
- Subscribers: 3.55 million (Ryan Hall, Y'all); 858 thousand (YallBot); 68.4 thousand (The Y'all Squad)
- Views: 757 million (Ryan Hall, Y'all); 10.8 million (YallBot); 2.4 million (The Y'all Squad)
- Last updated: November 4, 2026
- Website: ryanhallyall.com

Ryan Keith Hall (born March 9, 1994), known as Ryan Hall, Y’all on social media, is an American YouTuber and internet personality. Self-proclaimed as the "Internet's Weather Man/meteorologist", he frequently uploads forecasts for upcoming severe weather and live streams ongoing severe weather events.

== Early life and education ==
Hall was born in Pikeville, Kentucky to Stephanie R. Ramsey. He enrolled at Mississippi State University in 2014 to pursue broadcast meteorology but dropped out in 2016. In 2014, he interned at WYMT-TV. Hall chose to leave Mississippi State and his aspiration of traditional TV broadcasting to pursue storm chasing.

== YouTube career ==
Hall was inspired by a snowstorm in December 2020 to make a YouTube Channel. He posted his first weather video to YouTube on January 4, 2021.

== Criticism ==
Hall has been criticized for some of his content and untenable statements, such as a video in 2022 claiming to forecast when exactly different regions would receive snow in the coming winter. Some have criticized his common use of clickbait and statements that present certainty in a prediction when traditional meteorologists have usually been more cautious about forecasting a storm or system. Kim Klockow McClain, a meteorologist at NOAA and a team lead for the Behavioral Insights Unit says that flashy thumbnails like those used by Hall can dilute the message of the video and skew a viewer's perception of an event being more serious than it is.

== Charitable work ==
In March 2023, Hall's viewers raised over $120,000 to help victims of the Amory and Rolling Fork, Mississippi tornadoes, along with supplies and meals. In May 2024, Hall's viewers raised $93,000 after an EF4 tornado hit the town of Greenfield, Iowa. Hall's charity, the Y'all Squad, provided supplies and meals to the storm victims. In September 2024, People reported the Y'all Squad collects between $30,000-$50,000 for each disaster which is used for food and emergency supplies and rebuilding assistance. As stated by Hall: “Whatever it seems like would be the best thing to do with $50,000, we just do that." In April 2026, the Y'all Squad gave away nearly 1,000 emergency weather radios for free in St. Louis, Missouri, ahead of a predicted severe weather outbreak.

== Personal life ==
Hall currently lives in Pikeville, Kentucky. He is married and has three children.
