= Riplinger, Wisconsin =

- Unincorporated community
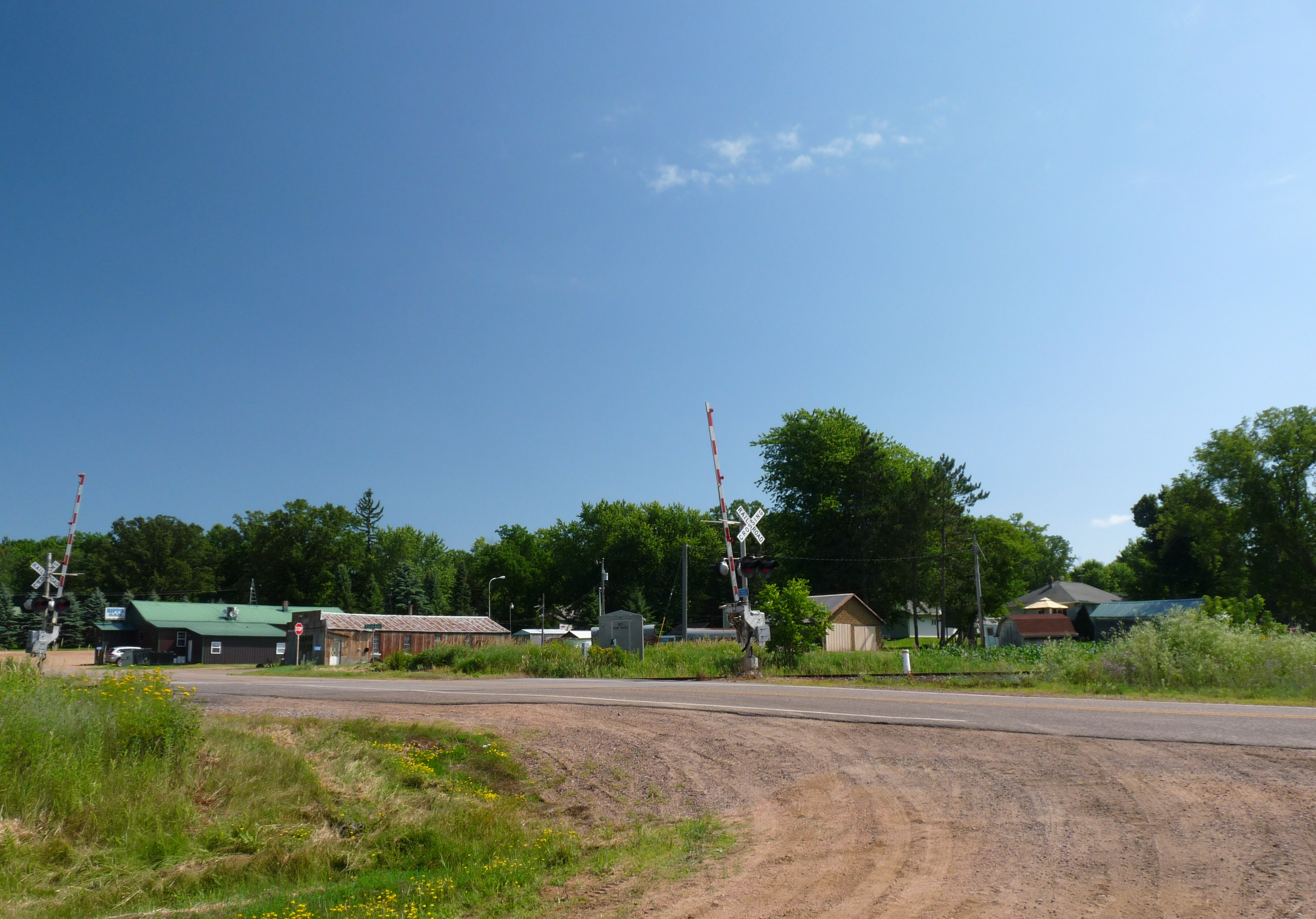

- Location within Wisconsin Location within the United States
- Coordinates: 44°49′30″N 90°24′11″W
- Country: United States
- State: Wisconsin
- County: Clark
- Town: Unity
- Elevation: 1,299 ft (396 m)
- Time zone: UTC-6 (Central (CST))
  - Summer (DST): UTC-5 (CDT)
- Area codes: 715 & 534
- GNIS feature ID: 1572337

Riplinger is an unincorporated community located in the town of Unity, Clark County, Wisconsin, United States.
