= Nyman, Iowa =

- Unincorporated community
- Location within Iowa
- Coordinates: 40°52′51″N 95°12′14″W
- Country: United States
- State: Iowa
- County: Page
- Elevation: 1,230 ft (370 m)
- Time zone: UTC-6 (Central (CST))
  - Summer (DST): UTC-5 (CDT)
- Area code: 712
- GNIS feature ID: 459684

Nyman is an unincorporated community in Fremont Township, Page County, Iowa, United States. Nyman is located along County Route M56, 6.3 miles (10.1 km) east-northeast of Essex.

== History ==
Nyman's population was 22 in 1902, and was 50 in 1925. The population was 24 in 1940.
