= East Nodaway River =

River in Iowa, U.S.

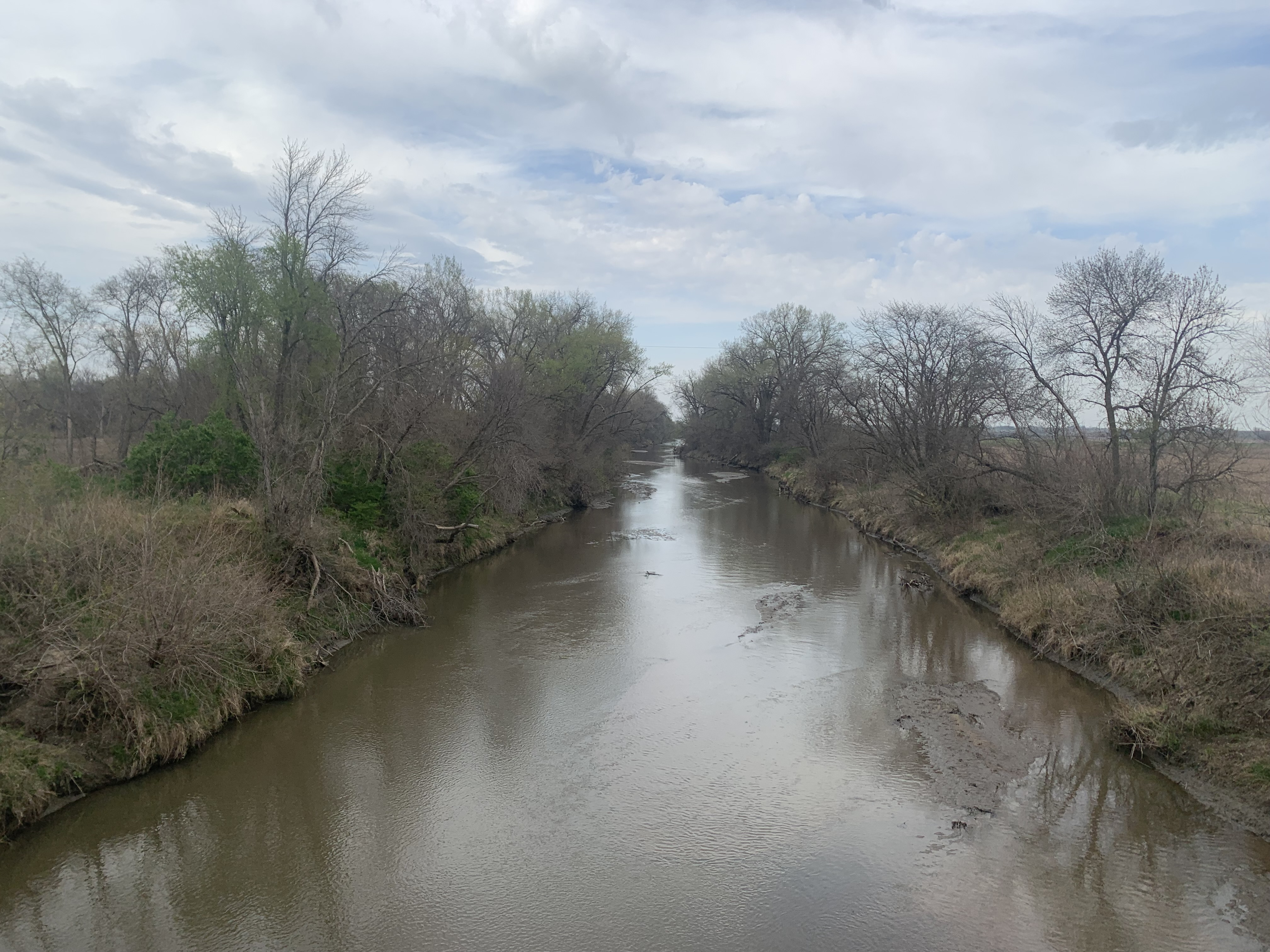
- The East Nodaway River at County Road J53 bridge southeast of Shambaugh

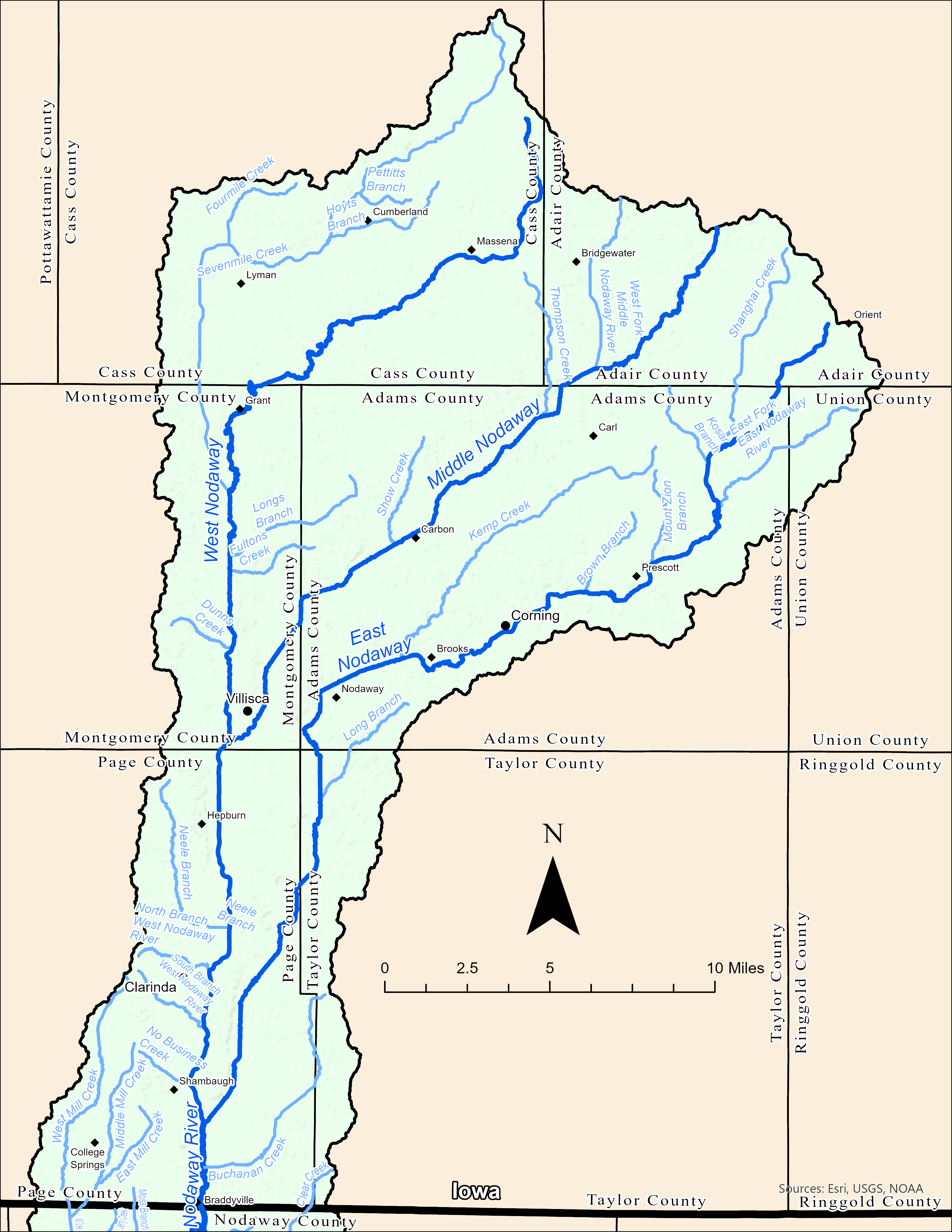
- Nodaway River watershed in Iowa; the East Nodaway River is to the right

Location
- Country: United States
- State: Iowa
- County: Adair, Adams, Page, and Taylor

Physical characteristics
- Source
  - location: Orient Township
  - coordinates: 41°12′34″N 94°26′23″W
  - elevation: 1,320 ft (400 m)
- Mouth: Nodaway River
  - location: Buchanan Township
  - coordinates: 40°38′06″N 95°01′09″W
  - elevation: 945 ft (288 m)
- Length: 73.4 mi (118.1 km)
- Basin size: 333.2 sq mi (863 km^{2})
- Width
  - average: 50ft
- Discharge
  - location: near Clarinda, Iowa
  - average: 74.75 cu ft/s (2.117 m^{3}/s)
  - minimum: 3.76 cu ft/s (0.106 m^{3}/s)
  - maximum: 20,500 cu ft/s (580 m^{3}/s)

Basin features
- Progression: East Nodaway River → Nodaway River → Missouri River → Mississippi River → Atlantic Ocean
- Waterbodies: Lake Icaria
- Stream gradient 5.5 ft/mi (1.04 m/km)

East Nodaway River is a stream in southwestern Iowa, in the United States. It is a tributary to the Nodaway River and is 73.4 miles long. The largest lake in southwestern Iowa, Lake Icaria, flows into the East Nodaway River via Kemp Creek. The stream is monitored a couple miles east of Clarinda, Iowa, by the NOAA and is considered a major water source by the Iowa DNR.

== History ==
From 1970 to 1975, the USGS monitored the East Nodaway River about 6 miles northeast of Prescott; it was not monitored again until 2018 when it began to be monitored near Clarinda. In 1984, a fish kill occurred due to a pesticide spill, but the severity of the matter was unclear.

== Geography ==
East Nodaway River is the left tributary to the Nodaway River and joins it 4.3 miles before the Iowa-Missouri border. Most of the East Nodaway is located in Adams County, a short portion near its source is in Adair County, and the last third of the stream is located in Page and Taylor counties. The watershed of the East Nodaway extends also into Montgomery County and Union County.

=== Communities ===
Corning is the largest city along the East Nodaway. Four other villages are located along the river: Brooks, Nodaway, Orient, and Prescott. Three other communities are located around the watershed but not along the river: Carl, New Market, and Quincy.

=== Course ===
The East Nodaway River starts a mile west of Orient and flows south into Lake Orient. Afterwards, the river windingly flows southwest for about 15 miles before passing Prescott to the east. The river continues west-southwest and passes Corning to the south, then four miles later it does the same to Brooks, and after another 9 miles it passes Nodaway to the north and west. Then the East Nodaway River travels southwesterly until more than 20 miles before joining with the West Nodaway River to form the Nodaway River two miles southeast of Shambaugh.

=== Hydrology ===
There are 15 permitted wastewater treatment facility and 20 permitted point source discharges that flow into the East Nodaway River, all of which are in Adams County.

=== Tributaries ===
There are eight named direct and indirect tributaries of the East Nodaway River: Long Branch, Kemp Creek (the part before Lake Icaria is also known as Walters Creek), Brown Branch, Mount Zion Branch, Cipra Branch, East Fork East Nodaway River, Kosar Branch, and Shanghai Creek.

=== Crossings ===
One US Highway, US 34, crosses the East Nodaway River just southwest of Corning. Three Iowa State Highways: Iowa 2, Iowa 25, and Iowa 148 cross the East Nodaway River. There are nine County Highways that cross it.

The California Zephyr Amtrak passenger railway crosses the East Nodaway River five times in Adams County. The first time is just west of Nodaway, and the last time is just east of Prescott, where the stream continues north of the railroad.

A historic Parker through truss bridge that was built around 1930 and is located east of Corning and carries Nodaway River Road. A historic pony truss bridge that was built in 1976 is located in Adams County and carries Tulip Avenue.

=== Recreation ===
There are a couple of parks along the East Nodaway River: Spring Lake Park in Corning and Lake Orient Recreation Area southwest of Orient. The two other major lakes in the watershed have recreation areas around them; Lake Binder has a small park with an RV park, and Lake Icaria has a large recreation area, with multiple campgrounds, fishing areas, and a small beach.

== See also ==
- Tributaries of the Nodaway River
- List of rivers of Iowa
