= Jasper Township, Iowa =

Jasper Township, Iowa may refer to:

- Jasper Township, Adams County, Iowa
- Jasper Township, Carroll County, Iowa

== See also ==
- Jasper Township (disambiguation)
