= Corning Commercial Historic District =

Historic district in Iowa, United States

- U.S. National Register of Historic Places
- U.S. Historic district
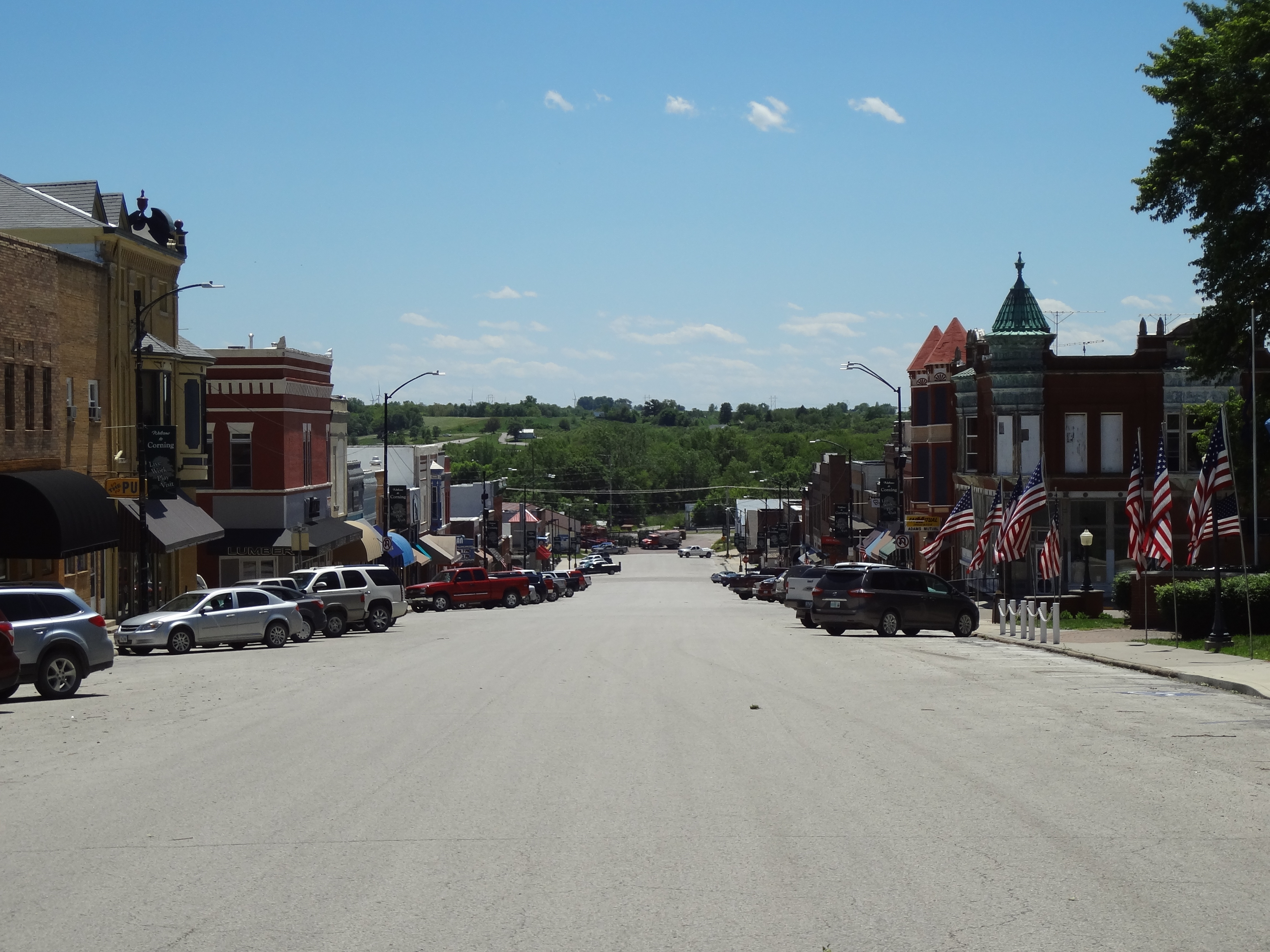
- Davis Avenue, facing south

- Location within Iowa Location within the United States
- Location: 513-824 Davis Ave., 701-829 Benton Ave. & cross streets, Corning, Iowa
- Coordinates: 40°59′20.6″N 94°44′05.3″W
- Area: 18.11 acres (7.33 ha)
- Architectural style: Late Victorian; Late 19th and Early 20th Century American Movements
- NRHP reference No.: 12000318
- Added to NRHP: May 31, 2012

The Corning Commercial Historic District is a nationally recognized historic district located in Corning, Iowa, United States. It was listed on the National Register of Historic Places in 2012. At the time of its nomination the district consisted of 78 resources, including 56 contributing buildings, one contributing site, one contributing object, 18 non-contributing buildings, and one non-contributing structure. The district covers most of the central business district. It has a linear layout, with twin main streets (Davis and Benton), associated with Central Park and the Adams County Courthouse (not in the district) at its uppermost end. This is an unusual town layout and is thought to be the only town in Iowa so configured. The elevation slopes down toward the East Nodaway River, south of the downtown and a light industrial area.

The commercial buildings are mostly masonry structures constructed with bricks. Many of them replaced wood-frame structures that were destroyed in an 1896 fire. Two other periods of major development include the years after the Panic of 1893 and the Great Depression. The latter focuses on the role the Federal government played in the enhancement of public art. The buildings are from one- to three stories in height, although most are no taller than two stories. Besides commercial use, buildings here also housed theaters, government functions, especially federal agricultural agencies, and the inclusion of automobile-related businesses. The Corning Opera House (1902) is individually listed on the National Register. The park and its fountain are the contributing site and the contributing object.
