= Jasper Township, Missouri =

Jackson Township is the name of 6 townships in the U.S. state of Missouri:

- Jasper Township, Camden County, Missouri
- Jasper Township, Dallas County, Missouri
- Jasper Township, Jasper County, Missouri
- Jasper Township, Ozark County, Missouri
- Jasper Township, Ralls County, Missouri
- Jasper Township, Taney County, Missouri

== See also ==
- Jasper Township (disambiguation)
