= Iveyville, Iowa =

Unincorporated community in Iowa, US

- Unincorporated community
- Location within Iowa
- Coordinates: 40°54′03″N 94°47′45″W
- Country: United States
- State: Iowa
- County: Adams
- Elevation: 1,289 ft (393 m)
- Time zone: UTC-6 (Central (CST))
  - Summer (DST): UTC-5 (CDT)
- Area code: 641
- GNIS feature ID: 457878

Iveyville is an unincorporated community or ghost town in Adams County, Iowa, United States.

== History ==
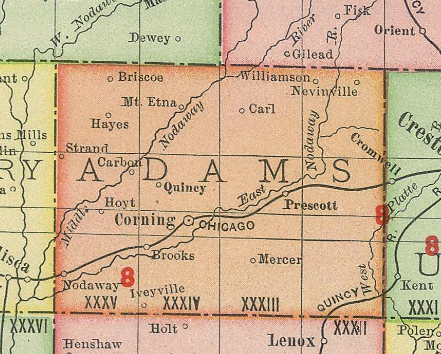
Adams County, Iowa, in 1903, showing the location of Iveyville.

A post office was opened in Iveyville in 1885, and remained in operation until it was discontinued in 1903. The community was named for B.F. Ivey, who lived in nearby Corning before relocating to Iveyville.

Iveyville, located in Jasper Township, was described as a "prosperous village", with a woodmen's hall and the Farmers Creamery in the late 1800s. Iveyville's only church was the Methodist Episcopal church; a general store was operated by O. T. Muzzy. The community also had a town hall on the second floor of the store, as well as a blacksmith shop and a grist mill. The Tanner Bros operated a hardware store in Iveyville.

Iveyville's population was 46 in 1902, but the closure of the post office in the community "finished" the village, according to a news story in the Adams County Free Press. In 1922, the last business in Iveyville, the blacksmith shop, relocated to nearby Nodaway. By 1925, Iveyville's population was 30.

By the 1930s, Iveyville was no longer marked on regional maps, and did not appear on the 1930 Adams County plat map.
