= Jasper Township =

Jasper Township may refer to:

== Arkansas ==
- Jasper Township, Crawford County, Arkansas, in Crawford County, Arkansas
- Jasper Township, Crittenden County, Arkansas, in Crittenden County, Arkansas

== Illinois ==
- Jasper Township, Wayne County, Illinois

== Iowa ==
- Jasper Township, Adams County, Iowa
- Jasper Township, Carroll County, Iowa

== Michigan ==
- Jasper Township, Michigan

== Missouri ==
- Jasper Township, Dallas County, Missouri
- Jasper Township, Ozark County, Missouri, in Ozark County, Missouri
- Jasper Township, Jasper County, Missouri
- Jasper Township, Camden County, Missouri
- Jasper Township, Taney County, Missouri
- Jasper Township, Ralls County, Missouri

== Ohio ==
- Jasper Township, Fayette County, Ohio

== South Dakota ==
- Jasper Township, Hanson County, South Dakota, in Hanson County, South Dakota
