= Colony Township =

Colony Township may refer to the following townships in the United States:

- Colony Township, Adams County, Iowa
- Colony Township, Delaware County, Iowa
- Colony Township, Greeley County, Kansas
- Colony Township, Knox County, Missouri
