= Corning Opera House =

- U.S. National Register of Historic Places
- U.S. Historic district – Contributing property
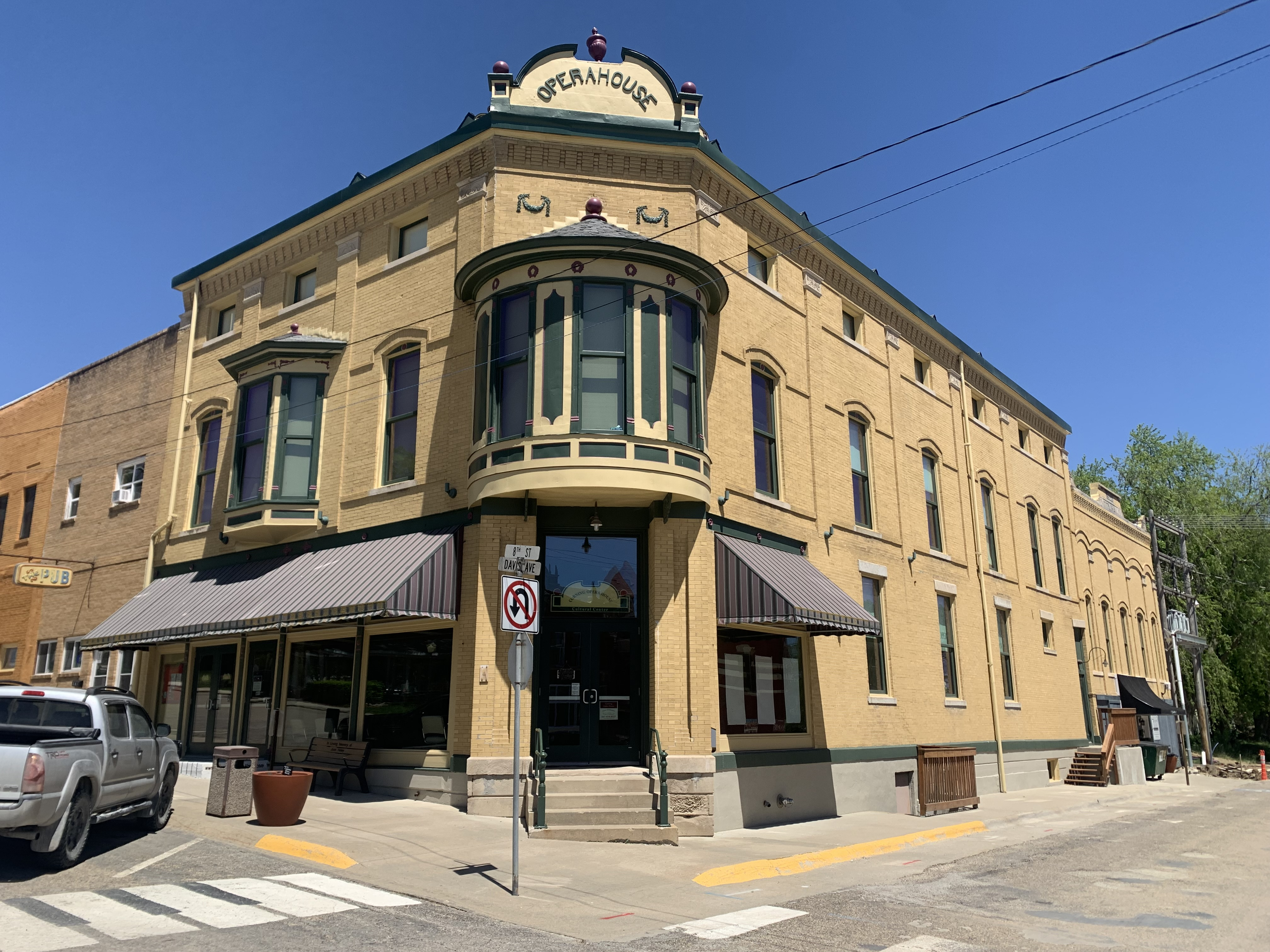

- Location within Iowa Location within the United States
- Location: 800 Davis Ave. Corning, Iowa
- Coordinates: 40°59′24″N 94°44′02″W
- Area: less than one acre
- Built: 1902
- Architectural style: Italianate
- Part of: Corning Commercial Historic District (ID12000318)
- MPS: Footlights in Farm Country: Iowa Opera Houses, 1835-1940
- NRHP reference No.: 93000954
- Added to NRHP: September 21, 1993

The Corning Opera House is a theater located in Corning, Iowa, United States. This was the third of three opera houses built in town. The other two were built in the 1880s, and this one was completed in 1902. It was the only opera house in Corning by 1907, and it served as a theater until 1934. From its opening in 1902 until 1921 it staged theatrical performances, and from about 1920 to 1931 it showed movies. It also staged vaudeville performances and high school productions. The theater was located on the second floor. It features the original raked stage, seating on the main floor and the original horseshoe-shaped balcony, and it has a small stage and backstage offers a make up room and 2 green rooms. Historically, Commercial space was located on the main floor of the building, now the first floor features a conference room for renting and a commercial kitchen.

From 1934 to 1999 the second-floor opera house was used for storage by the local newspaper. The western part of the building, the lobby and restroom area, was converted into apartments in 1943. The main floor in the opera house was leveled and marked for half-court basketball at some point. The building was individually listed on the National Register of Historic Places in 1993. In 2012 it was included as a contributing property in the Corning Commercial Historic District.

A multi-year $3.5 million renovation was completed in 2012. At that time the opera house was restored to a performance venue. A grand opening was held April 5 and 6, 2012. From 2012 to now the opera house offers live entertainment, is a rental venue, offers backstage tours and educational opportunities.
