= Prescott Township, Adams County, Iowa =

Township in Iowa, US

Prescott Township, Adams County
- Township
- Coordinates: 41°01′46″N 094°38′35″W
- Country: United States
- State: Iowa
- County: Adams

Area
  - Total: 35.58 sq mi (92.15 km^{2})
  - Land: 35.52 sq mi (91.99 km^{2})
  - Water: 0.062 sq mi (0.16 km^{2})
- Elevation: 1,204 ft (367 m)

Population (2010)
  - Total: 424
  - Density: 12/sq mi (4.6/km^{2})
- Time zone: UTC-6 (CST)
  - Summer (DST): UTC-5 (CDT)
- FIPS code: 19-93504
- GNIS feature ID: 0468576

Prescott Township is one of twelve townships in Adams County, Iowa, United States. At the 2010 census, its population was 424.

Prescott Township was formed in 1873 from the formerly named Queen City Township, to which a portion of Quincy Township was also annexed.

== Geography ==
Prescott Township covers an area of 35.58 square miles (92.2 km^{2}) and contains one incorporated settlement, Prescott. According to the USGS, it contains four cemeteries: Evergreen, Icarian, Mount Pleasant and Old Evergreen.
