= Quincy Township, Adams County, Iowa =

Township in Iowa, US

Quincy Township, Adams County
- Township
- Coordinates: 41°01′42″N 094°45′45″W
- Country: United States
- State: Iowa
- County: Adams

Area
  - Total: 35.34 sq mi (91.53 km^{2})
  - Land: 33.93 sq mi (87.89 km^{2})
  - Water: 1.41 sq mi (3.64 km^{2})
- Elevation: 1,224 ft (373 m)

Population (2010)
  - Total: 1,779
  - Density: 52/sq mi (20.2/km^{2})
- Time zone: UTC-6 (CST)
  - Summer (DST): UTC-5 (CDT)
- FIPS code: 19-93531
- GNIS feature ID: 0468585

Quincy Township is one of twelve townships in Adams County, Iowa, United States. At the 2010 census, its population was 1779.

== Geography ==
Quincy Township covers an area of 35.34 square miles (91.5 km^{2}) and contains one incorporated settlement, Corning (the county seat). According to the USGS, it contains five cemeteries: Oakland, Old Queen City, Queen City, Quincy and Walnut Grove. The unincorporated community of Quincy and the ghost town of Queen City are located within Quincy Township.
