= Adams County Courthouse (Iowa) =

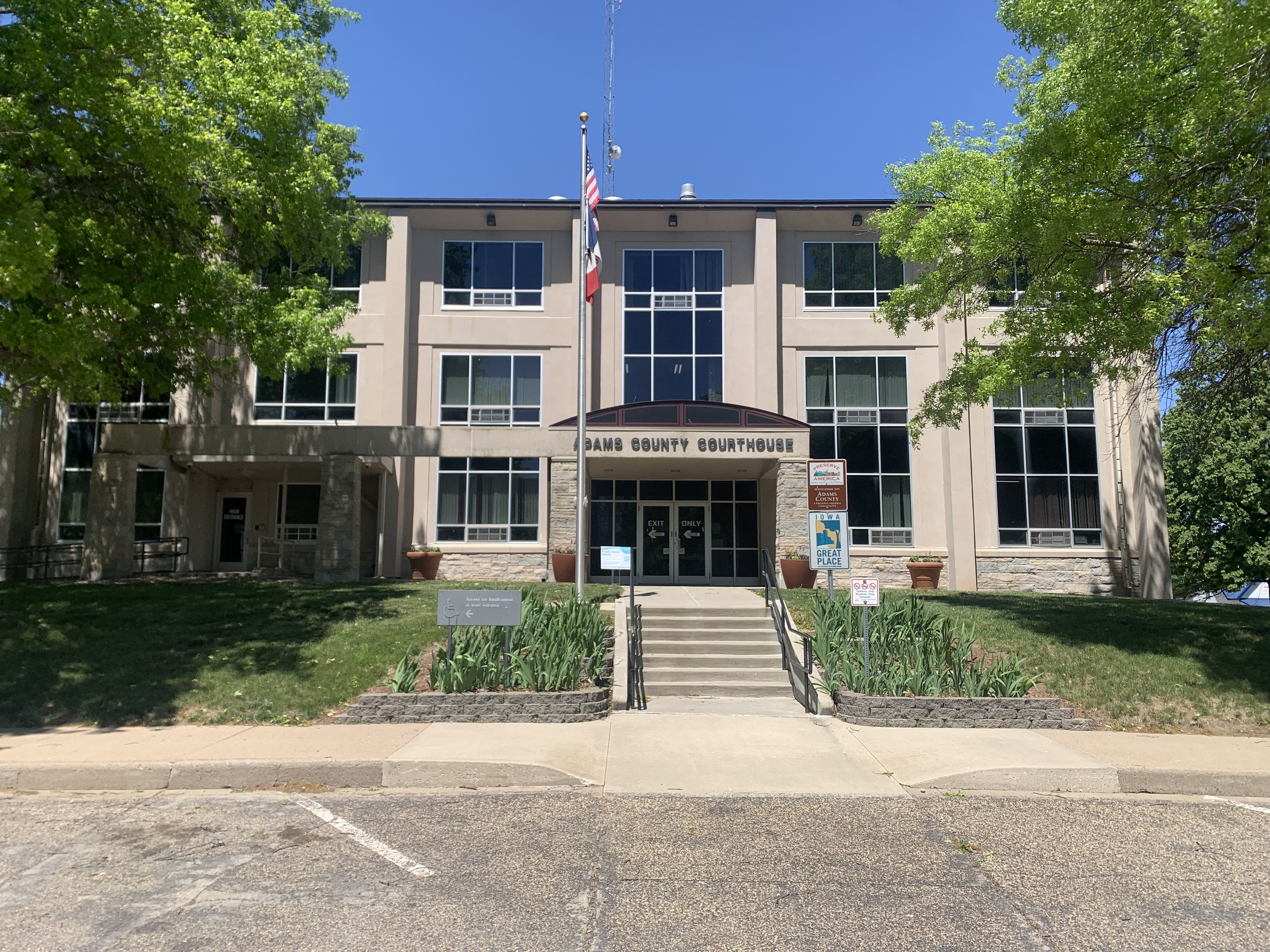
- Adams County Courthouse

General information
- Type: Courthouse
- Architectural style: Modern
- Location: 500 Ninth St., Corning, Iowa, United States
- Coordinates: 40.991248°N 94.734821°W
- Completed: 1955
- Inaugurated: October 7, 1955

Technical details
- Floor count: Three

The Adams County Courthouse is located in Corning, Iowa, United States. It is either the fourth or fifth building used by Adams County to house county courts and administration offices.

== History ==
Quincy was Adams County's first county seat, and a frame building was built for a courthouse in the 1850s. The building was later used for a school before it was torn down in 1932. There is some indication that a second courthouse was built in Quincy, but the evidence is not conclusive. The county seat was moved to Corning in 1872, and a frame building was erected for a courthouse by the local citizens. It was destroyed in a fire on February 1, 1888. The destroyed building was replaced by a brick Romanesque Revival structure in 1890 for $28,183. It was designed by Council Bluffs architect S.E. Maxon, who designed Adair County Courthouse in Greenfield, the Monona County Courthouse in Onawa, and the Fremont County Courthouse in Sidney, Iowa.. As it was being torn down in 1955 the roof collapsed, narrowly missing some of the workers. The present Modernist courthouse was completed in 1955 for $218,635. When it was completed, it featured concrete walls painted light green separated by panels in between the windows that were painted pink.
