= Jasper Township, Arkansas =

Jasper Township, Arkansas may refer to:

- Jasper Township, Crawford County, Arkansas
- Jasper Township, Crittenden County, Arkansas

== See also ==
- List of townships in Arkansas
- Jasper Township (disambiguation)
