= Lincoln Township, Adams County, Iowa =

Township in Iowa, US

Lincoln Township, Adams County
- Township
- Coordinates: 41°06′58″N 094°52′14″W
- Country: United States
- State: Iowa
- County: Adams

Area
  - Total: 35.0 sq mi (90.7 km^{2})
  - Land: 35.0 sq mi (90.7 km^{2})
  - Water: 0 sq mi (0 km^{2})
- Elevation: 1,184 ft (361 m)

Population (2010)
  - Total: 79
  - Density: 2.3/sq mi (0.9/km^{2})
- Time zone: UTC-6 (CST)
  - Summer (DST): UTC-5 (CDT)
- FIPS code: 19-92517
- GNIS feature ID: 0468238

Lincoln Township is one of twelve townships in Adams County, Iowa, United States. At the 2010 census, its population was 79.

== Geography ==
Lincoln Township covers an area of 35.02 square miles (90.7 km^{2}) and contains no incorporated settlements. According to the USGS, it contains two cemeteries: Lincoln Center and Strand. Both the unincorporated community of Lincoln Center and the ghost town of Strand, are located in Lincoln Township.
