= Carl Township =

Carl Township may refer to the following townships in the United States:

- Carl Township, Adams County, Iowa
- Carl Township, McPherson County, South Dakota
