= Prescott School District =

Prescott School District may refer to:

- Prescott School District (Arkansas), based in Prescott, Arkansas.
- Prescott Community School District, based in Prescott, Iowa.
- Prescott School District (Washington), based in Prescott, Washington.
- Prescott School District (Wisconsin), based in Prescott, Wisconsin.
- Prescott Unified School District, based in Prescott, Arizona.
