= Nevinville, Iowa =

- Unincorporated community
- Location within Iowa
- Coordinates: 41°08′50″N 94°30′03″W
- Country: United States
- State: Iowa
- County: Adams
- Elevation: 1,316 ft (401 m)
- Time zone: UTC-6 (Central (CST))
  - Summer (DST): UTC-5 (CDT)
- Area code: 641
- GNIS feature ID: 459462

Nevinville is an unincorporated community in Adams County, Iowa, United States.

== History ==
Nevinville was founded in 1856. It was named for Rev. Edwin H. Nevin.

The population was 102 in 1940.

== See also ==
- Strand, Iowa
