= Washington Township, Adams County, Iowa =

Township in Iowa, US

Washington Township, Adams County
- Township
- Coordinates: 41°06′56″N 094°45′23″W
- Country: United States
- State: Iowa
- County: Adams

Area
  - Total: 35.55 sq mi (92.07 km^{2})
  - Land: 35.53 sq mi (92.01 km^{2})
  - Water: 0.023 sq mi (0.06 km^{2})
- Elevation: 1,194 ft (364 m)

Population (2000)
  - Total: 135
  - Density: 3.9/sq mi (1.5/km^{2})
- Time zone: UTC-6 (CST)
  - Summer (DST): UTC-5 (North American Central Time Zone)
- FIPS code: 19-94446
- GNIS feature ID: 0468900

Washington Township is one of twelve townships in Adams County, Iowa, United States. At the 2010 census, its population was 135.

== Geography ==
Washington Township covers an area of 35.55 square miles (92.1 km^{2}) and contains no incorporated settlements. According to the USGS (United States Geological Survey), it contains four cemeteries: Forest Hill, Homan, Mount Etna and Old Mount Etna.
