= Creston Community School District =

Public school district in Creston, Iowa, United States

Coordinates: 41.066470°N 94.363467°W

Location
- Creston, Iowa Adams, Union, and Ringgold counties United States
- Coordinates: 41.066470, -94.363467

District information
- Type: Local school district
- Grades: K-12
- Superintendent: Deron Stender
- Schools: 4
- Budget: $24,944,000 (2020-21)
- NCES District ID: 1908310

Students and staff
- Students: 1,442 (2022-23)
- Teachers: 108.76 FTE
- Staff: 146.69 FTE
- Student–teacher ratio: 13.26
- Athletic conference: Hawkeye 10
- District mascot: Panthers
- Colors: Red and Black

Other information
- Website: www.crestonschools.org

Creston Community School District is a public school district headquartered in Creston, Iowa.

The district is in sections of Adams and Union counties, with a very small section in Ringgold County. It serves Creston, Cromwell, and Prescott.

As of 2018, it had about 1,400 students. Also there are 114,59 teachers. With 89.3% of white students, 5.0% Hispanic/Latino, 3.1% two or more races, 1.5% Black or African American, 0.7% Asian or Asian Pacific

Islander, 0.3% American Indian or Alaska Native and 0.2% Native Hawaiian or Other Pacific Islander.

== History ==
On July 1, 2016, the Prescott Community School District merged into the Creston district. The election determining whether the districts would consolidate was held Tuesday April 7, 2015.

In 2019, the district announced plans to replace buses without seat belts with buses that have seat belts.

== Schools ==
- Creston Community High School (CCHS)
- Creston Community Middle School
- Creston Community Elementary School
- Creston Community Early Childhood Center (ECC)

The elementary and middle school occupy two separate buildings in the same campus, while the high school has its own campus. The Burton R. Jones Education Center has the district headquarters, Head Start center, preschool, alternative school, and the headquarters of the Green Hills Area Education Agency.

== Creston Community High School ==
=== Athletics ===
The Panthers compete in the Hawkeye 10 Conference in the following sports:

==== Fall Sports ====
- Cross Country
- Football
- Volleyball

==== Winter Sports ====
- Basketball
  - Boys' 2-time State Champions (1939, 1997)
- Bowling
- Wrestling
  - 2-time State Champions (2007, 2016 (as Creston-Orient Macksburg))
  - 2007 Class 2A State Duals Champions (as Creston-Orient Macksburg)

==== Spring Sports ====
- Golf
  - Boys' 2013 Class 3A State Champions (as Creston-Orient Macksburg)
  - Girls' 1969 State Champions
- Soccer
- Tennis
- Track and Field

==== Summer Sports ====
- Baseball
- Softball

== See also ==
- List of school districts in Iowa
- List of high schools in Iowa
