= Mercer Township, Adams County, Iowa =

Township in Iowa, US

Mercer Township, Adams County
- Township
- Coordinates: 40°56′36″N 094°38′41″W
- Country: United States
- State: Iowa
- County: Adams

Area
  - Total: 35.78 sq mi (92.67 km^{2})
  - Land: 35.78 sq mi (92.67 km^{2})
  - Water: 0 sq mi (0 km^{2})
- Elevation: 1,263 ft (385 m)

Population (2010)
  - Total: 153
  - Density: 4.4/sq mi (1.7/km^{2})
- Time zone: UTC-6 (CST)
  - Summer (DST): UTC-5 (CDT)
- FIPS code: 19-92916
- GNIS feature ID: 0468375

Mercer Township is one of twelve townships in Adams County, Iowa, United States. At the 2010 census, its population was 153.

== Geography ==
Mercer Township covers an area of 35.78 square miles (92.7 km^{2}) and contains no incorporated settlements.
