= Union Township, Adams County, Iowa =

Township in Iowa, US

Union Township, Adams County
- Township
- Coordinates: 41°01′46″N 094°31′41″W
- Country: United States
- State: Iowa
- County: Adams

Area
  - Total: 35.20 sq mi (91.18 km^{2})
  - Land: 35.20 sq mi (91.17 km^{2})
  - Water: 0.0039 sq mi (0.01 km^{2})
- Elevation: 1,198 ft (365 m)

Population (2010)
  - Total: 144
  - Density: 4.1/sq mi (1.6/km^{2})
- Time zone: UTC-6 (CST)
  - Summer (DST): UTC-5 (CDT)
- FIPS code: 19-94164
- GNIS feature ID: 0468806

Union Township is one of twelve townships in Adams County, Iowa, United States. At the 2010 census, its population was 144.

== Geography ==
Union Township covers an area of 35.2 square miles (91 km^{2}) and contains no incorporated settlements. According to the USGS, it contains one cemetery, Summit.
