= Lake Icaria =

Reservoir in Iowa, U.S.

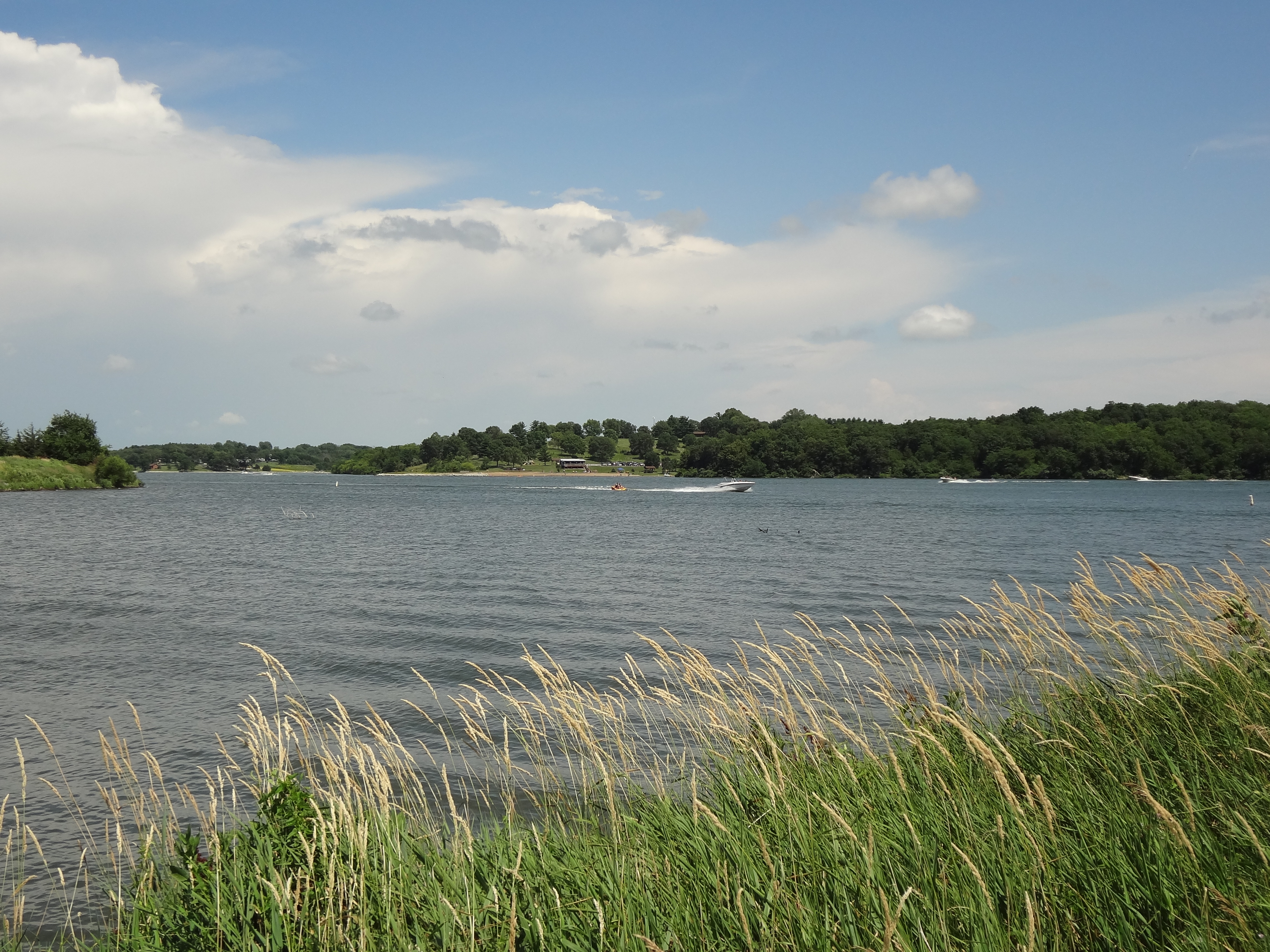
- View of boats on the main ski zone of Lake Icaria in Iowa

- Location within Iowa Location within the United States
- Location: Adams County, Iowa, United States
- Coordinates: 41°03′35″N 94°43′35″W
- Type: Reservoir
- Primary inflows: Walters Creek
- Primary outflows: Walters Creek
- Basin countries: United States
- Surface area: 650 acres (3 km^{2})
- Max. depth: 35 ft (11 m)
- Water volume: 5,061,363,000 US gallons (19.15934×10^{6} m^{3})
- Surface elevation: 1,168 ft (356 m)

Lake Icaria is a reservoir located 4 miles north of Corning, Iowa, in Adams County along Iowa Highway 148. It was built as part of the Watershed Protection and Flood Prevention Act and was completed in 1978. It is fed by Walters Creek in its northwest corner, with its dam located on the west side of the lake. Its dam is 1,300 feet (400 m) long and 56.5 feet (17.2 m) high.

The lake has a beach, marina, playgrounds, picnic shelters, cabins, campgrounds, and nature trails. Fish that can be caught in the lake include largemouth bass, bluegill, crappie, channel catfish, perch, walleye, and wiper.

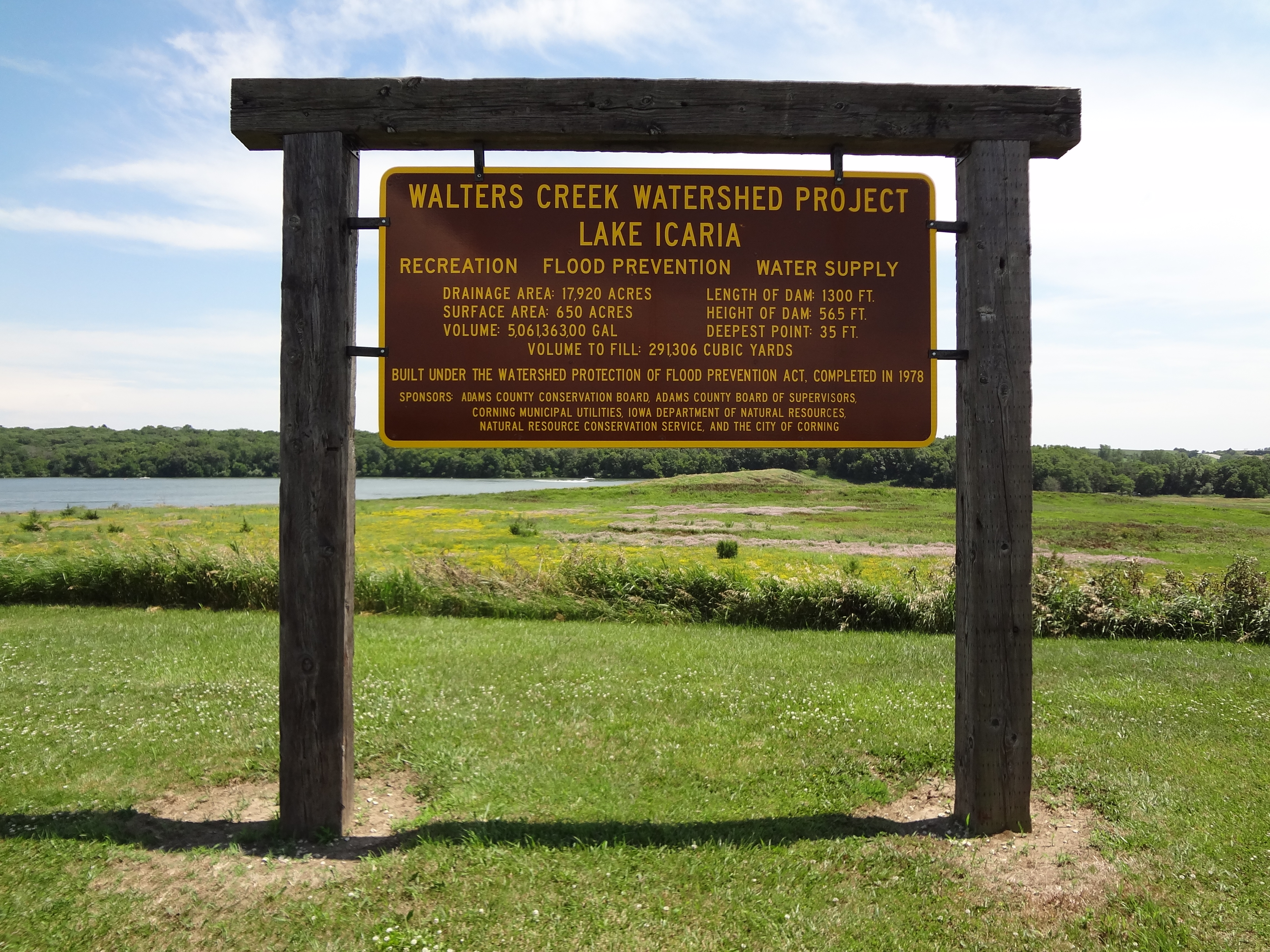
View of the main information sign for Lake Icaria in Iowa. It is located at the lake's northwest entrance off of Iowa Highway 148.
