= Jasper Township, Taney County, Missouri =

Township in Taney County, Missouri, U.S.

Coordinates: 36.7694°N 93.2094°W

Jasper Township is an active township in Taney County, in the U.S. state of Missouri.

Jasper Township was founded in 1837, most likely taking its name from the local Jasper family.
