= Prescott Community School District =

Defunct school district in Iowa, United States

Prescott Community School District was a school district headquartered in Prescott, Iowa, United States. It had a single school, Prescott Community School.

== History ==
The school building was built in 1914 and the district was established that year.

In the 1990s the Prescott district closed its secondary school and only served elementary school; it sent secondary students to other school districts.

In the 2014–2015 school year, the school's final year of operation, the elementary school had 34 students. In 2013 the members of the Prescott school board began discussing proposals to consolidate with other area school districts. The election determining whether the district would consolidate with the Creston Community School District was held on April 7, 2015. After the consolidation vote passed, the district property was put up for sale. The district was in operation for the 2015–2016 school year, but all of its students attended other districts' schools.

On July 1, 2016, the Prescott district merged into the Creston district.

== Property ==
The district had a total of 8 acres (3.2 ha) of land, including two school buildings, a playground, a gymnasium, a running track, and a bus barn.
