= Carl Township, Adams County, Iowa =

Township in Iowa, US

Carl Township, Adams County
- Township
- Coordinates: 41°06′32″N 094°38′21″W
- Country: United States
- State: Iowa
- County: Adams

Area
  - Total: 35.8 sq mi (92.7 km^{2})
  - Land: 35.61 sq mi (92.23 km^{2})
  - Water: 0.18 sq mi (0.47 km^{2})
- Elevation: 1,257 ft (383 m)

Population (2010)
  - Total: 149
  - Density: 4.1/sq mi (1.6/km^{2})
- Time zone: UTC-6 (CST)
  - Summer (DST): UTC-5 (CDT)
- FIPS code: 19-90471
- GNIS feature ID: 0467530

Carl Township is one of twelve townships in Adams County, Iowa, United States. At the 2010 census, its population was 149.

== Geography ==
Carl Township covers an area of 35.79 square miles (92.7 km^{2}) and contains no incorporated settlements. According to the USGS, it contains two cemeteries: Carl and Mount Zion. The small unincorporated community of Carl is located in Carl Township.
