= Prescott, Iowa =

- City
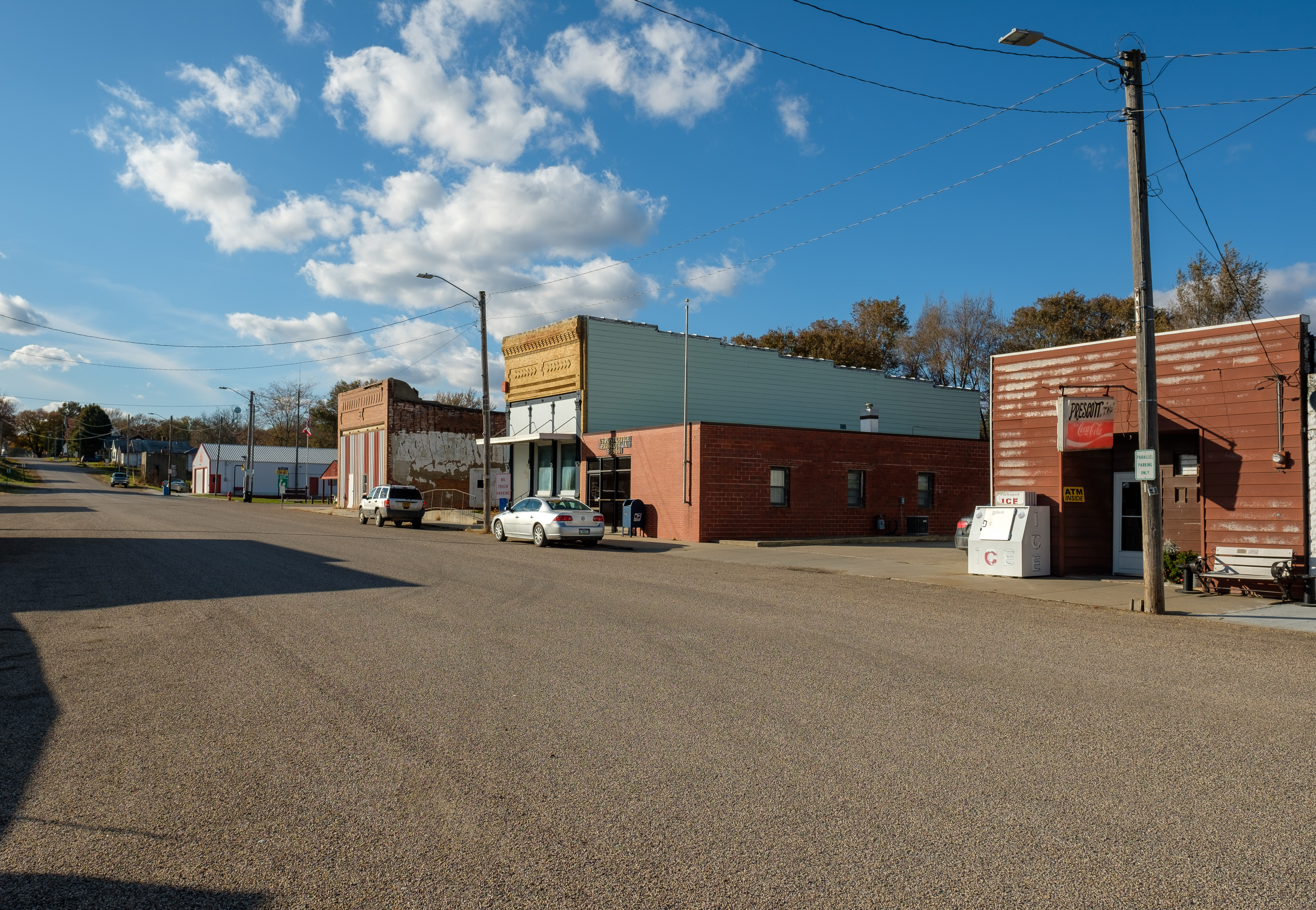
- Stores along 6th Avenue

- Location of Prescott, Iowa
- Coordinates: 41°01′25″N 94°36′46″W
- Country: United States
- State: Iowa
- County: Adams
- Township: Prescott
- Incorporated: November 26, 1890

Area
  - Total: 0.43 sq mi (1.12 km^{2})
  - Land: 0.43 sq mi (1.12 km^{2})
  - Water: 0 sq mi (0.00 km^{2})
- Elevation: 1,184 ft (361 m)

Population (2020)
  - Total: 191
  - Density: 441.2/sq mi (170.34/km^{2})
- Time zone: UTC-6 (Central (CST))
  - Summer (DST): UTC-5 (CDT)
- ZIP code: 50859
- Area code: 641
- FIPS code: 19-64560
- GNIS feature ID: 2396270

Prescott is a city in Prescott Township, Adams County, Iowa, United States. The population was 191 at the time of the 2020 census.

== History ==
Prescott was incorporated as a city on November 26, 1890.

== Geography ==
According to the United States Census Bureau, the city has a total area of 0.40 square miles (1.04 km^{2}), all land.

== Demographics ==
Historical populations
Year	Pop.	±%
1880	248	—
1890	302	+21.8%
1900	446	+47.7%
1910	426	−4.5%
1920	429	+0.7%
1930	442	+3.0%
1940	400	−9.5%
1950	372	−7.0%
1960	331	−11.0%
1970	305	−7.9%
1980	349	+14.4%
1990	287	−17.8%
2000	266	−7.3%
2010	257	−3.4%
2020	191	−25.7%
Source:"U.S. Census website". United States Census Bureau. and Iowa Data Center; Source: U.S. Decennial Census

=== 2020 census ===
As of the census of 2020, there were 191 people, 81 households, and 55 families residing in the city. The population density was 441.2 inhabitants per square mile (170.3/km^{2}). There were 106 housing units at an average density of 244.8 per square mile (94.5/km^{2}). The racial makeup of the city was 94.8% White, 0.0% Black or African American, 0.0% Native American, 0.0% Asian, 0.0% Pacific Islander, 0.0% from other races and 5.2% from two or more races. Hispanic or Latino persons of any race comprised 1.6% of the population.

Of the 81 households, 34.6% of which had children under the age of 18 living with them, 50.6% were married couples living together, 11.1% were cohabitating couples, 21.0% had a female householder with no spouse or partner present and 17.3% had a male householder with no spouse or partner present. 32.1% of all households were non-families. 27.2% of all households were made up of individuals, 6.2% had someone living alone who was 65 years old or older.

The median age in the city was 42.2 years. 22.5% of the residents were under the age of 20; 8.9% were between the ages of 20 and 24; 25.7% were from 25 and 44; 22.5% were from 45 and 64; and 20.4% were 65 years of age or older. The gender makeup of the city was 49.7% male and 50.3% female.

=== 2010 census ===
As of the census of 2010, there were 257 people, 109 households, and 77 families living in the city. The population density was 642.5 inhabitants per square mile (248.1/km^{2}). There were 127 housing units at an average density of 317.5 per square mile (122.6/km^{2}). The racial makeup of the city was 98.8% White, 0.8% Native American, and 0.4% Asian.

There were 109 households, of which 27.5% had children under the age of 18 living with them, 63.3% were married couples living together, 6.4% had a female householder with no husband present, 0.9% had a male householder with no wife present, and 29.4% were non-families. 20.2% of all households were made up of individuals, and 5.5% had someone living alone who was 65 years of age or older. The average household size was 2.36 and the average family size was 2.78.

The median age in the city was 44.8 years. 22.2% of residents were under the age of 18; 8.5% were between the ages of 18 and 24; 19.4% were from 25 to 44; 33.5% were from 45 to 64; and 16.3% were 65 years of age or older. The gender makeup of the city was 46.3% male and 53.7% female.

=== 2000 census ===
As of the census of 2000, there were 266 people, 118 households, and 78 families living in the city. The population density was 664.7 inhabitants per square mile (256.6/km^{2}). There were 129 housing units at an average density of 322.3 per square mile (124.4/km^{2}). The racial makeup of the city was 99.62% White, and 0.38% from two or more races.

There were 118 households, out of which 23.7% had children under the age of 18 living with them, 58.5% were married couples living together, 7.6% had a female householder with no husband present, and 33.1% were non-families. 31.4% of all households were made up of individuals, and 21.2% had someone living alone who was 65 years of age or older. The average household size was 2.25 and the average family size was 2.80.

Age spread: 21.1% under the age of 18, 7.5% from 18 to 24, 20.3% from 25 to 44, 31.6% from 45 to 64, and 19.5% who were 65 years of age or older. The median age was 46 years. For every 100 females, there were 81.0 males. For every 100 females age 18 and over, there were 84.2 males.

The median income for a household in the city was $28,500, and the median income for a family was $38,542. Males had a median income of $21,250 versus $14,063 for females. The per capita income for the city was $11,714. About 5.8% of families and 7.8% of the population were below the poverty line, including none of those under the age of eighteen and 9.8% of those 65 or over.

== Education ==
Prescott is within the Creston Community School District. It was in the Prescott Community School District until July 1, 2016, when it merged into the Creston district.

== Notable people ==
- Horace Daggett, Iowa state legislator and farmer, was born in Prescott.
