= Colony Township, Adams County, Iowa =

Township in Iowa, US

Colony Township, Adams County
- Township
- Coordinates: 41°06′53″N 094°31′21″W
- Country: United States
- State: Iowa
- County: Adams

Area
  - Total: 35.65 sq mi (92.33 km^{2})
  - Land: 35.64 sq mi (92.31 km^{2})
  - Water: 0.0039 sq mi (0.01 km^{2})
- Elevation: 1,250 ft (381 m)

Population (2010)
  - Total: 174
  - Density: 4.9/sq mi (1.9/km^{2})
- Time zone: UTC-6 (CST)
  - Summer (DST): UTC-5 (CDT)
- FIPS code: 19-90780
- GNIS feature ID: 0467640

Colony Township is one of twelve townships in Adams County, Iowa, United States. At the 2010 census, its population was 174.

== Geography ==
Colony Township covers an area of 35.65 square miles (92.3 km^{2}) and contains no incorporated settlements. According to the USGS, it contains two cemeteries: Bohemian National and Rose Hill. Colony Township was settled by Bohemian immigrants starting in the 1840s.
