= Adams County, Iowa =

County in Iowa, United States

- County
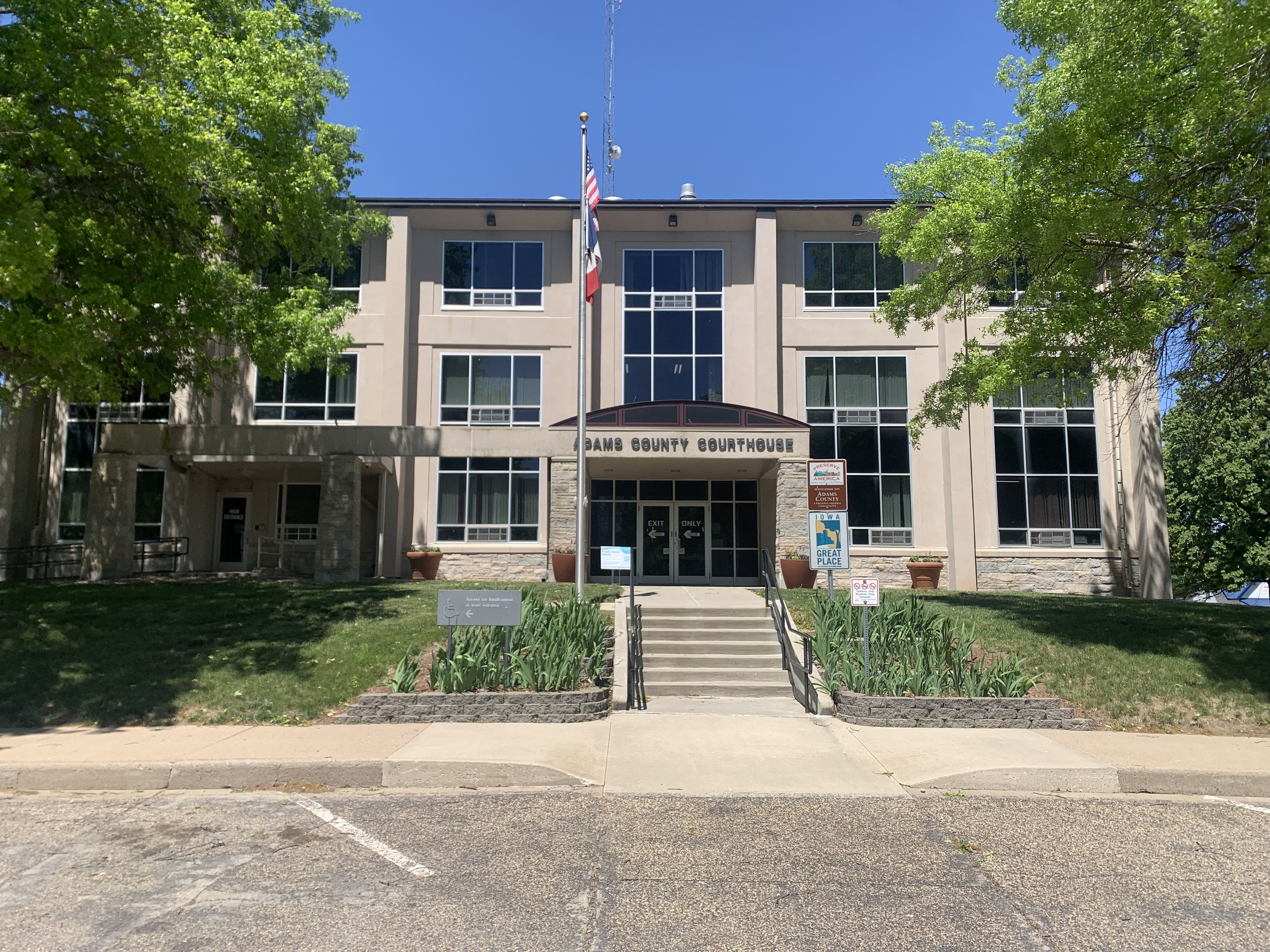
- Adams County Courthouse in Corning

- Logo

- Location within the U.S. state of Iowa
- Coordinates: 41°01′45″N 94°41′57″W
- Country: United States
- State: Iowa
- Founded: March 12, 1853
- Named for: John Adams
- Seat: Corning
- Largest city: Corning

Area
  - Total: 426 sq mi (1,100 km^{2})
  - Land: 423 sq mi (1,100 km^{2})
  - Water: 2.1 sq mi (5.4 km^{2}) 0.5%

Population (2020)
  - Total: 3,704
  - Estimate (2025): 3,617 ▼
  - Density: 8.76/sq mi (3.38/km^{2})
- Time zone: UTC−6 (Central)
  - Summer (DST): UTC−5 (CDT)
- Congressional district: 3rd
- Website: adamscounty.iowa.gov
- Iowa county number 02

Adams County is a county in the U.S. state of Iowa. As of the 2020 United States census, the population was 3,704, making it Iowa's least-populous county. Its county seat is Corning.

== History ==
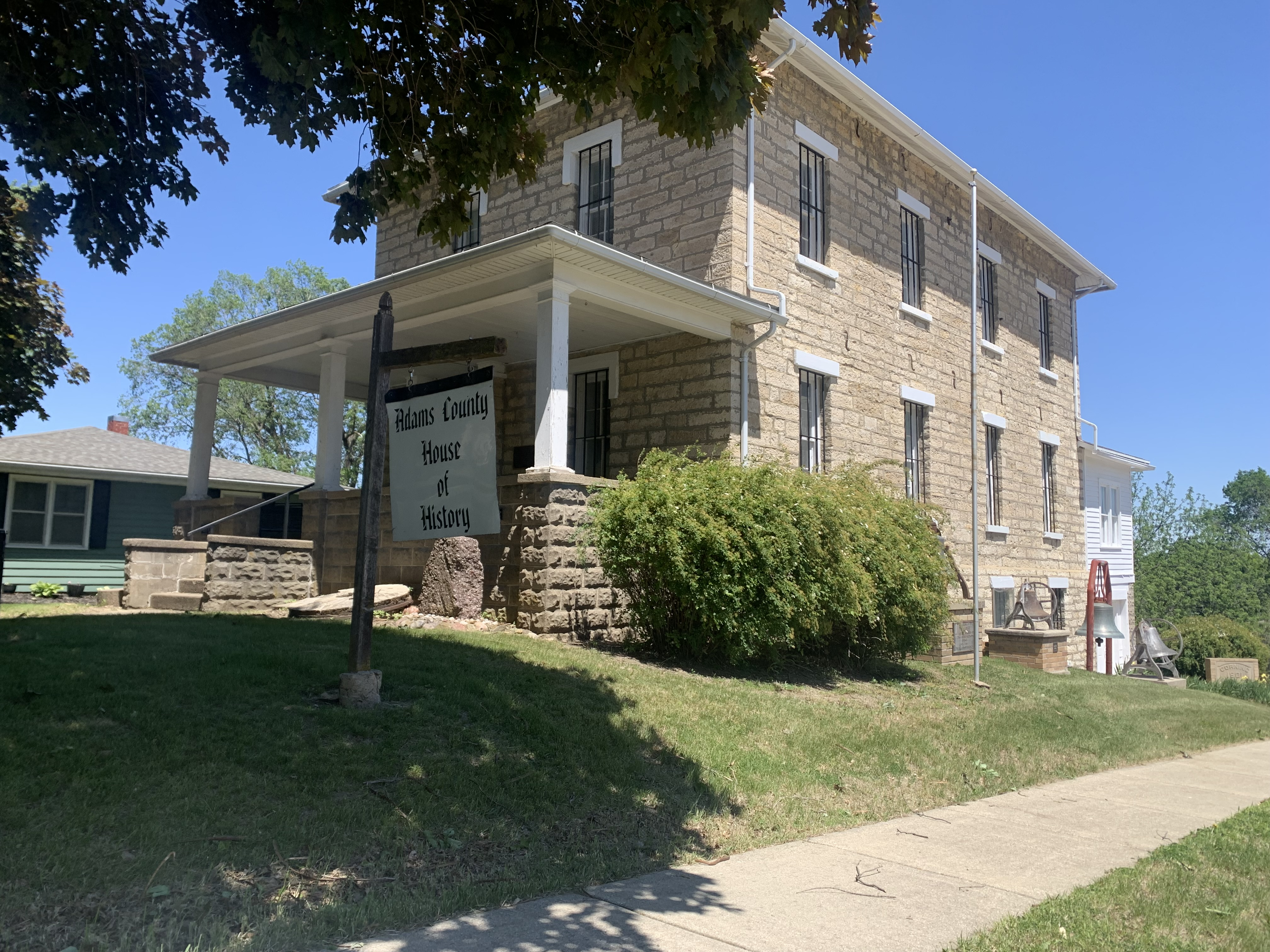
Adams County House of History in Corning

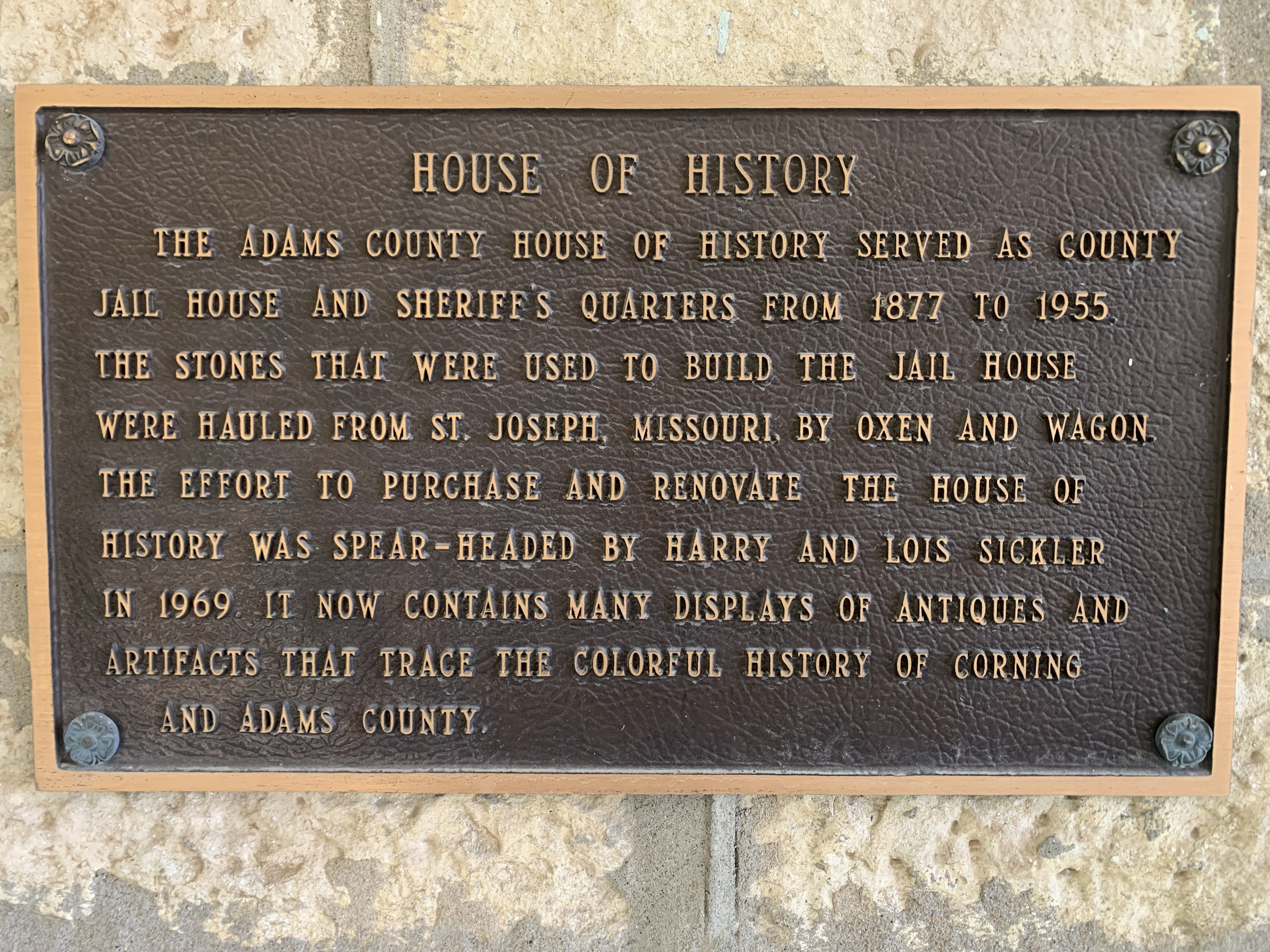
Adams County House of History plaque

Adams County was established by the state legislature in 1851 and named in honor of the second President of the United States, John Adams, or his son, the sixth President, John Quincy Adams (sources differ). The county was finally organized and separated from Pottawattamie County on March 12, 1853. Its original size was later reduced by the creation of Montgomery and Union counties.

The first county seat was Quincy. In 1872, it was moved to Corning.

== Geography ==
According to the United States Census Bureau, the county has a total area of 426 square miles (1,100 km^{2}), of which 423 square miles (1,100 km^{2}) is land and 2.1 square miles (5.4 km^{2}) (0.5%) is water. Almost half (46%) of the county is in the East Nodaway River watershed.

=== Major highways ===
- U.S. Highway 34
- Iowa Highway 148

=== Adjacent counties ===
- Cass County (northwest)
- Adair County (northeast)
- Union County (east)
- Taylor County (south)
- Montgomery County (west)

== Demographics ==
Historical population
Census	Pop.	Note	%±
1860	1,533		—
1870	4,614		201.0%
1880	11,888		157.7%
1890	12,292		3.4%
1900	13,601		10.6%
1910	10,998		−19.1%
1920	10,521		−4.3%
1930	10,437		−0.8%
1940	10,156		−2.7%
1950	8,753		−13.8%
1960	7,468		−14.7%
1970	6,322		−15.3%
1980	5,731		−9.3%
1990	4,866		−15.1%
2000	4,482		−7.9%
2010	4,029		−10.1%
2020	3,704		−8.1%
2025 (est.)	3,617	▼	−2.3%
U.S. Decennial Census; 1790–1960 1900–1990; 1990–2000 2010–2020

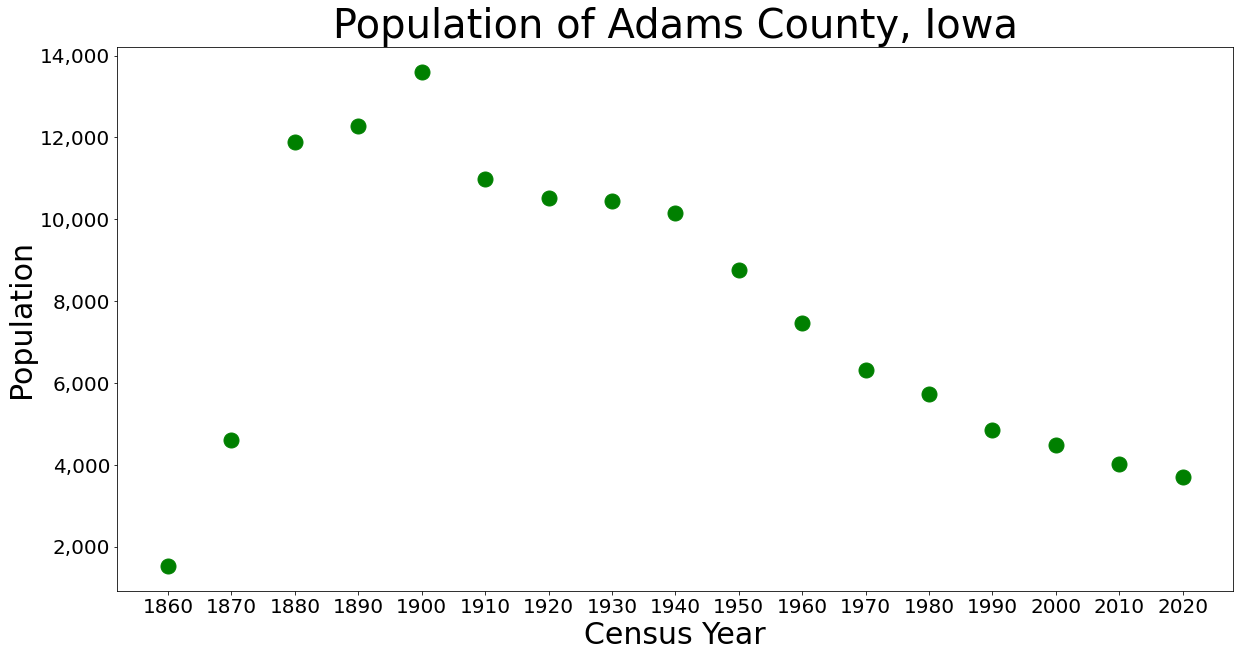
Population of Adams County, Iowa, from the U.S. census data

=== 2020 census ===
As of the 2020 census, the county had a population of 3,704. The median age was 45.6 years, 21.9% of residents were under age 18, and 23.2% were 65 years of age or older. For every 100 females there were 97.7 males, and for every 100 females age 18 and over there were 98.1 males age 18 and over.

The racial makeup of the county was 95.3% White, 0.3% Black or African American, 0.5% American Indian and Alaska Native, 0.4% Asian, <0.1% Native Hawaiian and Pacific Islander, 0.6% from some other race, and 2.9% from two or more races. Hispanic or Latino residents of any race comprised 1.1% of the population.

<0.1% of residents lived in urban areas, while 100.0% lived in rural areas.

There were 1,614 households in the county, of which 25.2% had children under the age of 18 living in them. Of all households, 51.1% were married-couple households, 19.1% were households with a male householder and no spouse or partner present, and 23.6% were households with a female householder and no spouse or partner present. About 32.1% of all households were made up of individuals and 16.8% had someone living alone who was 65 years of age or older.

Of the 1,888 housing units, 1,614 were occupied and 14.5% were vacant. Among occupied housing units, 77.2% were owner-occupied and 22.8% were renter-occupied. The homeowner vacancy rate was 0.6% and the rental vacancy rate was 10.5%.

=== 2010 census ===
As of the 2010 census, there were 4,029 people, 1,715 households, and 1,126 families residing in the county. The population density was 9.5 inhabitants per square mile (3.7/km^{2}). There were 2,010 housing units at an average density of 4.7 per square mile (1.8/km^{2}). The racial makeup of the county was 98.1% white, 0.6% Asian, 0.5% American Indian, 0.2% black or African American, 0.1% from other races, and 0.5% from two or more races. Those of Hispanic or Latino origin made up 0.9% of the population. In terms of ancestry, 33.6% were German, 15.9% were Irish, 14.7% were English, and 4.9% were American.

Of the 1,715 households, 25.7% had children under the age of 18 living with them, 56.2% were married couples living together, 5.8% had a female householder with no husband present, 34.3% were non-families, and 29.0% of all households were made up of individuals. The average household size was 2.28 and the average family size was 2.81. The median age was 46.7 years.

The median income for a household in the county was $40,368 and the median income for a family was $52,782. Males had a median income of $33,505 versus $25,332 for females. The per capita income for the county was $23,549. About 6.0% of families and 12.2% of the population were below the poverty line, including 8.9% of those under age 18 and 18.5% of those age 65 or over.

== Communities ==
=== Cities ===
- Carbon
- Corning (county seat)
- Lenox (mostly in Taylor County)
- Nodaway
- Prescott

=== Hamlets ===
- Brooks
- Carl
- Iveyville
- Lincoln Center
- Mercer
- Mt. Etna
- Nevinville
- Queen City
- Quincy
- Strand
- Stringtown
- Williamson

=== Population ranking ===
The population ranking of the following table is based on the 2020 United States census.

† county seat

Rank	City/town/etc.	Municipal type	Population (2020 census)	Population (2024 Estimate)
1	† Corning	City	1,564	1,547
2	Prescott	City	191	190
3	Nodaway	City	74	62
4	Carbon	City	36	40

== Government ==
=== Civil townships ===
- Carl
- Colony
- Douglas
- Grant
- Jasper
- Lincoln
- Mercer
- Nodaway
- Prescott
- Quincy
- Union
- Washington

== Politics ==
United States presidential election results for Adams County, Iowa
Year	Republican		Democratic		Third party(ies)	
Year	No.	%	No.	%	No.	%
1896	1,736	49.77%	1,701	48.77%	51	1.46%
1900	1,873	55.22%	1,428	42.10%	91	2.68%
1904	1,761	58.92%	1,003	33.56%	225	7.53%
1908	1,595	53.03%	1,325	44.05%	88	2.93%
1912	913	32.81%	1,215	43.66%	655	23.54%
1916	1,401	50.20%	1,365	48.91%	25	0.90%
1920	2,845	62.43%	1,670	36.65%	42	0.92%
1924	2,547	54.28%	897	19.12%	1,248	26.60%
1928	2,958	66.04%	1,479	33.02%	42	0.94%
1932	1,795	45.57%	2,097	53.24%	47	1.19%
1936	2,953	56.06%	2,249	42.69%	66	1.25%
1940	3,182	60.13%	2,088	39.46%	22	0.42%
1944	2,540	57.56%	1,868	42.33%	5	0.11%
1948	2,142	53.39%	1,817	45.29%	53	1.32%
1952	3,129	69.06%	1,383	30.52%	19	0.42%
1956	2,248	55.92%	1,756	43.68%	16	0.40%
1960	2,185	57.08%	1,643	42.92%	0	0.00%
1964	1,321	40.48%	1,941	59.49%	1	0.03%
1968	1,868	59.72%	993	31.75%	267	8.54%
1972	1,814	59.57%	1,161	38.13%	70	2.30%
1976	1,388	47.26%	1,507	51.31%	42	1.43%
1980	1,779	59.62%	940	31.50%	265	8.88%
1984	1,706	57.64%	1,221	41.25%	33	1.11%
1988	1,080	45.38%	1,283	53.91%	17	0.71%
1992	863	33.24%	1,034	39.83%	699	26.93%
1996	920	39.55%	1,070	46.00%	336	14.45%
2000	1,170	54.55%	897	41.82%	78	3.64%
2004	1,317	56.65%	977	42.02%	31	1.33%
2008	1,046	47.42%	1,118	50.68%	42	1.90%
2012	1,108	50.71%	1,028	47.05%	49	2.24%
2016	1,395	66.24%	565	26.83%	146	6.93%
2020	1,530	70.83%	590	27.31%	40	1.85%
2024	1,517	71.05%	576	26.98%	42	1.97%

== Education ==
It is in the following school districts:

- CAM Community School District
- Corning Community School District
- Creston Community School District
- Griswold Community School District
- Lenox Community School District
- Villisca Community School District

Former districts

- Orient-Macksburg Community School District - Dissolved on July 1, 2026.

== See also ==
- National Register of Historic Places listings in Adams County, Iowa
