= Brooks, Iowa =

- Unincorporated community
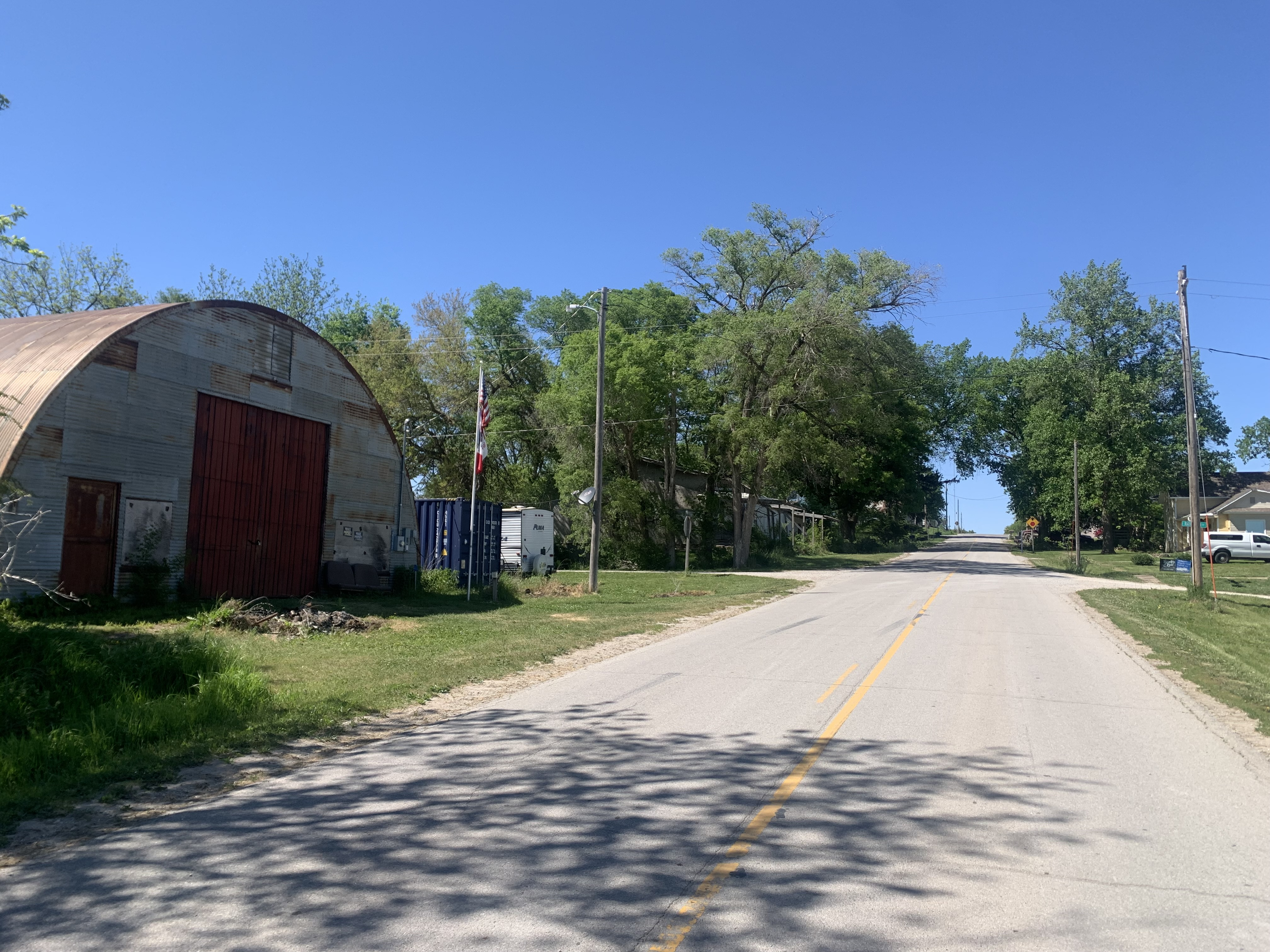
- Brooks from Ginkgo Avenue facing north

- Location within Iowa
- Coordinates: 40°57′55″N 94°48′18″W
- Country: United States
- State: Iowa
- County: Adams
- Elevation: 1,139 ft (347 m)
- Time zone: UTC-6 (Central (CST))
  - Summer (DST): UTC-5 (CDT)
- Area code: 641
- GNIS feature ID: 454843

Brooks is an unincorporated community in Adams County, Iowa, United States.

== History ==
Brooks was originally called Canaan City, and under the latter name was founded circa 1853. The population was 200 in 1940.
