= Queen City, Iowa =

City in Iowa, USA

Coordinates: 41°00′15″N 94°42′10″W

"Because of adversity they were not heralded... Because they were here, they need not be forgotten!"

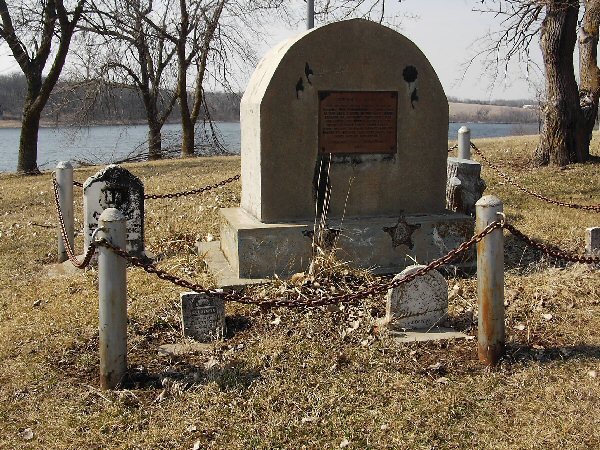
Monument and gravestones dedicated to Queen City dead, next to Lake Binder, Iowa

Queen City was a farming town in Adams County, Iowa, United States, located about three miles (5 km) northeast of present-day Corning, Iowa, and northwest of the Icarian commune with which it shared a post office. Queen City co-existed with the Icarian colony and was possibly created before the Icarian society was founded in 1854.

The town was officially platted in October 1857, after three men purchased 262 acres (1.06 km^{2}) from landowner Samuel Larimer for development. Larimer was named Queen City's first postmaster in 1858 when the post office was moved from Icaria. The town grew to a population of about 150, at its peak in the 1860s, and had general stores, a drug store, doctor's office, and two hotels. However, Queen City's fortunes declined when Corning was selected as the local railroad stop in 1869 and county seat in 1872. The number of residents dwindled, and the plat for the town returned to private ownership in March 1885.

U.S. Census records reflect that the township in Adams County where Queen City was located was called Queen City Township as of 1860 (pop. 212). However, the name was changed to Prescott Township in 1873.

Queen City was all but forgotten, and not a significant part of written Adams County history, until Lake Binder was created as a water supply for nearby Corning. When the lake was dug, some tombstones and an estimated 200 gravesites were found. The remains and gravestones were moved to a new location, today just north of the lake, where a monument was built marking the abandoned town in 1980.
