= Jasper Township, Carroll County, Iowa =

Township in Iowa, US

Jasper Township, Carroll County
- Township
- Coordinates: 42°09′45″N 094°41′26″W
- Country: United States
- State: Iowa
- County: Carroll

Area
  - Total: 35.54 sq mi (92.06 km^{2})
  - Land: 34.95 sq mi (90.53 km^{2})
  - Water: 0.59 sq mi (1.53 km^{2})
- Elevation: 1,132 ft (345 m)

Population (2000)
  - Total: 358
  - Density: 10/sq mi (4/km^{2})
- FIPS code: 19-92196
- GNIS feature ID: 0468126

Jasper Township is one of eighteen townships in Carroll County, Iowa, USA. As of the 2000 census, its population was 358.

== Geography ==
Jasper Township covers an area of 35.54 square miles (92.0 km^{2}) and contains one incorporated settlement, Lanesboro. According to the USGS, it contains two cemeteries: Lanesboro and Salisbury.
