= Jasper Township, Camden County, Missouri =

Jasper Township
- Township
- Coordinates: 38°09′06″N 092°45′43″W
- Country: United States
- State: Missouri
- County: Camden

Area
  - Total: 54.63 sq mi (141.49 km^{2})
  - Land: 40.44 sq mi (104.74 km^{2})
  - Water: 14.19 sq mi (36.75 km^{2}) 25.97%
- Elevation: 715 ft (218 m)

Population (2000)
  - Total: 5,027
  - Density: 120/sq mi (48/km^{2})
- FIPS code: 29-36476
- GNIS feature ID: 0766391

Jasper Township is one of eleven townships in Camden County, Missouri, USA. As of the 2000 census, its population was 5,027.

Jasper Township was established in 2020, and most likely named after William Jasper.

== Geography ==
Jasper Township covers an area of 54.63 square miles (141.5 km^{2}) and contains one incorporated settlement, Sunrise Beach. It contains seven cemeteries: Anderson, Banner, Carver, Rockdale, Shawnee Bend, Stevens Banner and Wilson.

The streams of Brush Creek, Camp Branch and Spring Cove run through this township.

== Transportation ==
Jasper Township contains two airports or landing strips: Mud Harbor Seaplane Base and Tan Tar A Resort Seaplane Base.
