= Corning, Iowa =

- City
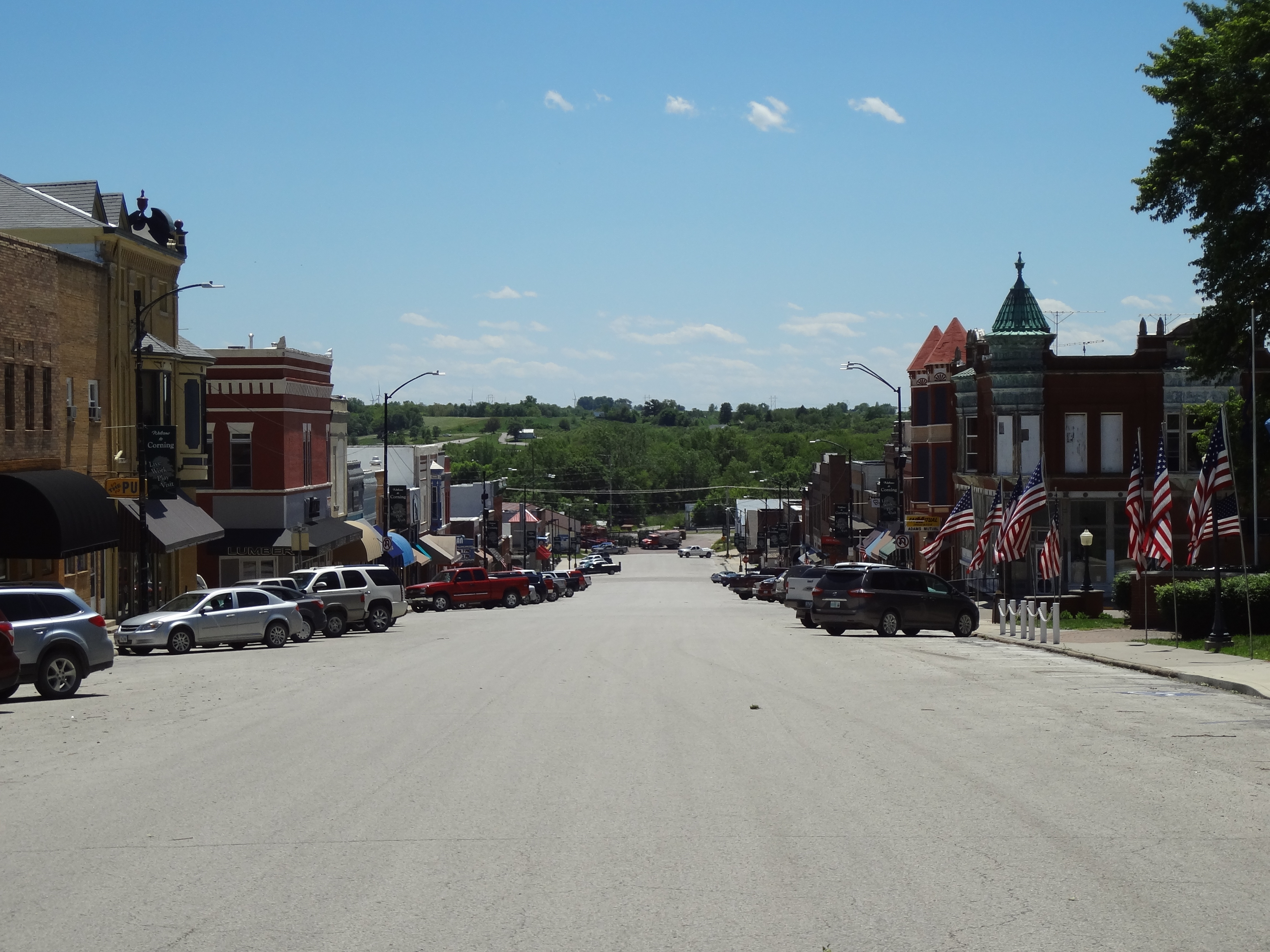
- View of Davis Avenue, downtown Corning

- Coordinates: 40°59′30″N 94°44′00″W
- Country: United States
- State: Iowa
- County: Adams
- Townships: Quincy, Jasper
- Established: 1869
- Incorporated: December 13, 1871

Area
  - Total: 1.56 sq mi (4.05 km^{2})
  - Land: 1.56 sq mi (4.04 km^{2})
  - Water: 0.0039 sq mi (0.01 km^{2})
- Elevation: 1,217 ft (371 m)

Population (2020)
  - Total: 1,564
  - Density: 1,003.7/sq mi (387.54/km^{2})
- Time zone: UTC-6 (Central (CST))
  - Summer (DST): UTC-5 (CDT)
- ZIP code: 50841
- Area code: 641
- FIPS code: 19-16500
- GNIS feature ID: 2393636
- Website: www.cityofcorningia.com

Corning is a city in Quincy and Jasper Townships, Adams County, Iowa, United States. The population was 1,564 at the 2020 census. It is the county seat of Adams County. Corning is located just north of the intersection of U.S. Route 34 and Iowa Highway 148. Corning is perhaps best known as the birthplace of Johnny Carson. Daniel Webster Turner, who was governor of Iowa from 1931 to 1933, was born in Corning on March 17, 1877.

The town is named for Erastus Corning who owned stock in the Burlington and Missouri River Railroad which reached Corning on August 23, 1869 (resulting in the local depot moving from nearby Queen City to Corning). Corning donated a church bell to the Methodist Church. Corning also owned sizeable shares of the Chicago, Burlington and Quincy Railroad and other towns on the railroad including Corning, Missouri.

== History ==
=== French Icarian settlement ===
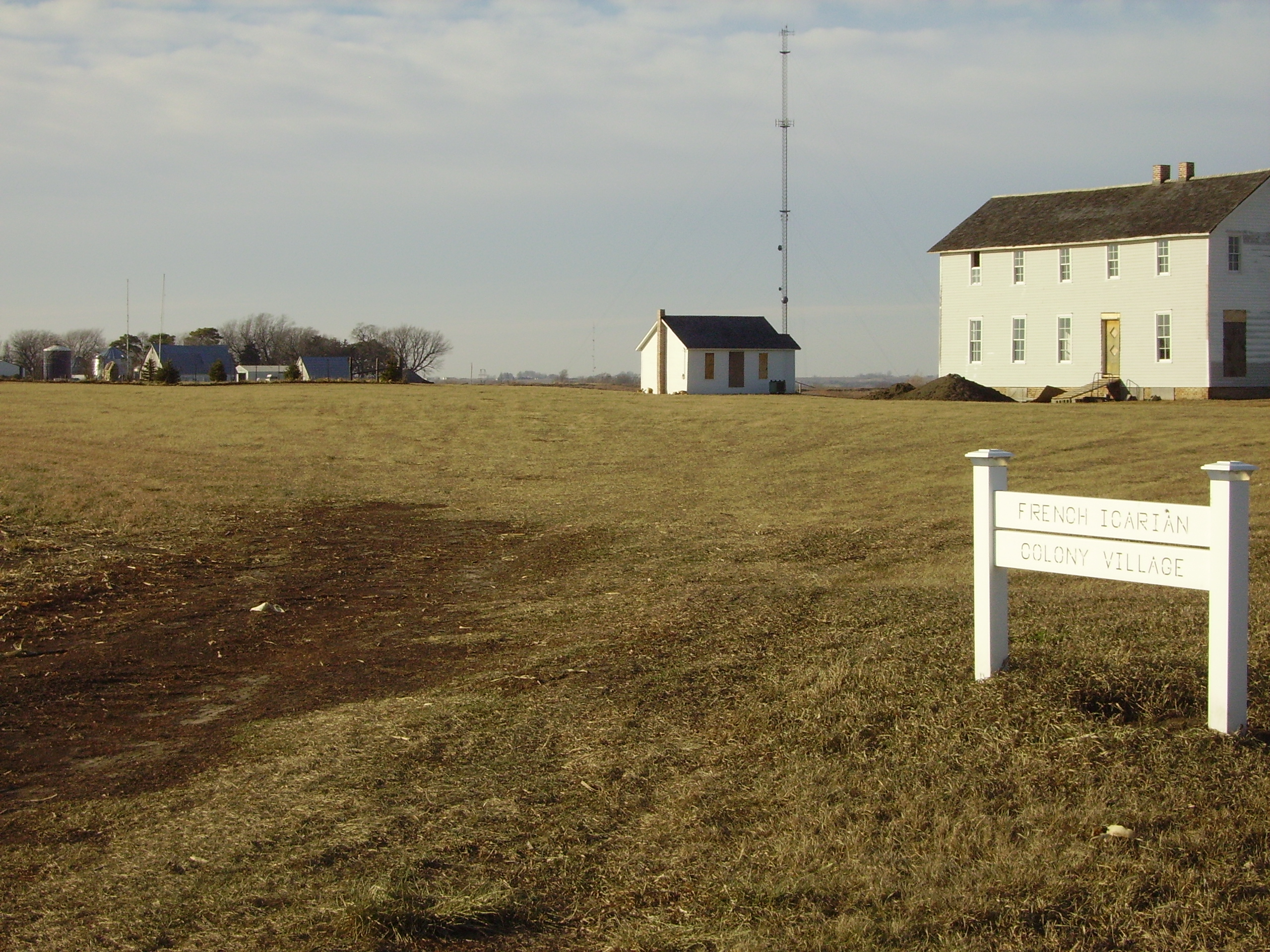
Icarian colony site near Corning

The first European settlers here were a group of French Icarians who came from Nauvoo, Illinois in 1852; they established a community near Lake Icaria, north of Corning in 1854. The new state of Iowa gave the town of "Icaria" a corporate charter in 1860. This community was dedicated to the utopian principles of Etienne Cabet and the democratic principles of the American Revolution and the French Revolution; this small French-speaking community considered themselves to be very patriotic Americans. In the 1860s, the community split between "traditionalists" and "progressives" (the latter favored women's right to vote). The "progressives" left the original site and moved to a new location about three miles (5 km) east of Corning's location. Although the corporation formally dissolved in 1878, some continued to live in the communal dwellings until 1898, making this the longest-lasting Icarian colony in the United States. Eventually the community disbanded and merged into the general population. Displays and documents about the Icarian community can be found at the Icarian History Foundation office and in the Adams County offices, both in Corning. The former colony east of Corning is slowly being restored with the help of state and federal grants, and it will become a historical site; as of 2006, only a couple of partially restored buildings and a very small cemetery (with grave markers inscribed in French) remain. Around the first weekend of June each year, Corning celebrates "Le Festival De L'Heritage Francais" in the French market.

=== American settlement ===
Nearby Queen City had been established circa 1854. Surveyors came to the location of Corning in 1857, though the area was largely uninhabited (except by the Icarians) until 1869.

Corning was incorporated as a city on December 13, 1871.

The first Adams County seat was established by act of the Iowa Legislature on January 12, 1853, at Quincy. The building was later used as a schoolhouse and in 1932, it was torn down. In November 1872, the people voted to remove the courthouse from Quincy and locate the county seat in Corning.

== Points of interest ==
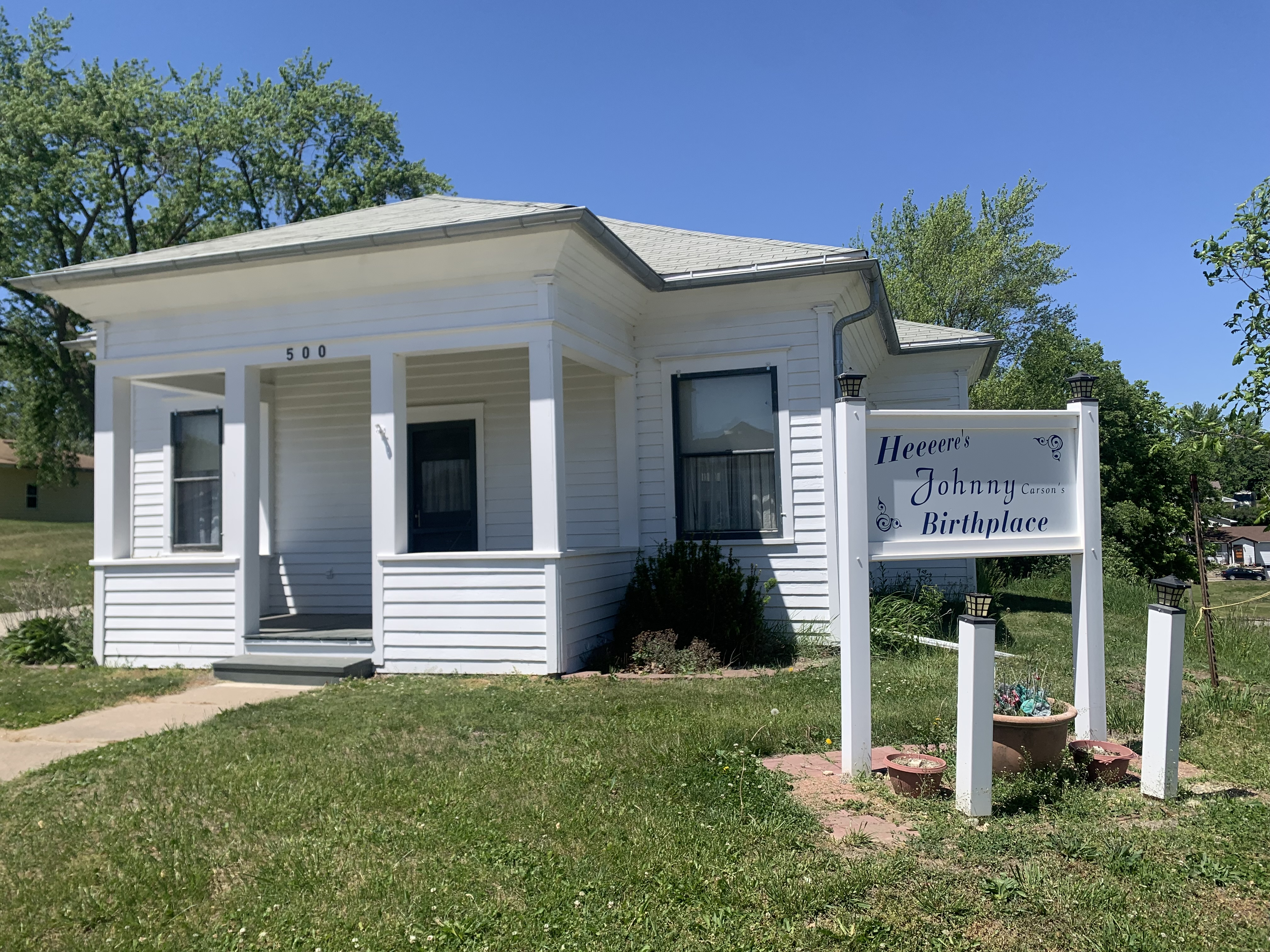
Johnny Carson birthplace in Corning, Iowa

The Corning post office contains a mural, Band Concert, painted in 1941 by Marion Gilmore. Murals were produced from 1934 to 1943 in the United States through the Section of Painting and Sculpture, later called the Section of Fine Arts, of the Treasury Department. Gilmore's original entry won a federal-sponsored Forty-Eight States design competition in 1939 and depicted a Sunday band concert but a local jury of concerned citizens requested that Gilmore's image contain only actual architecture and landmarks in the downtown district and that she remove a cannon and an obelisk from the image. Gilmore made the changes to accommodate a WPA requirement stipulating that murals should "suit the taste of the local townspeople".

== Festivals ==
Corning hosts Lazy Days of Summer on the last weekend in July. The weekend includes a BBQ competition, street dance, Doctors' Dash race, and other events around the community.

== Parks and recreation ==
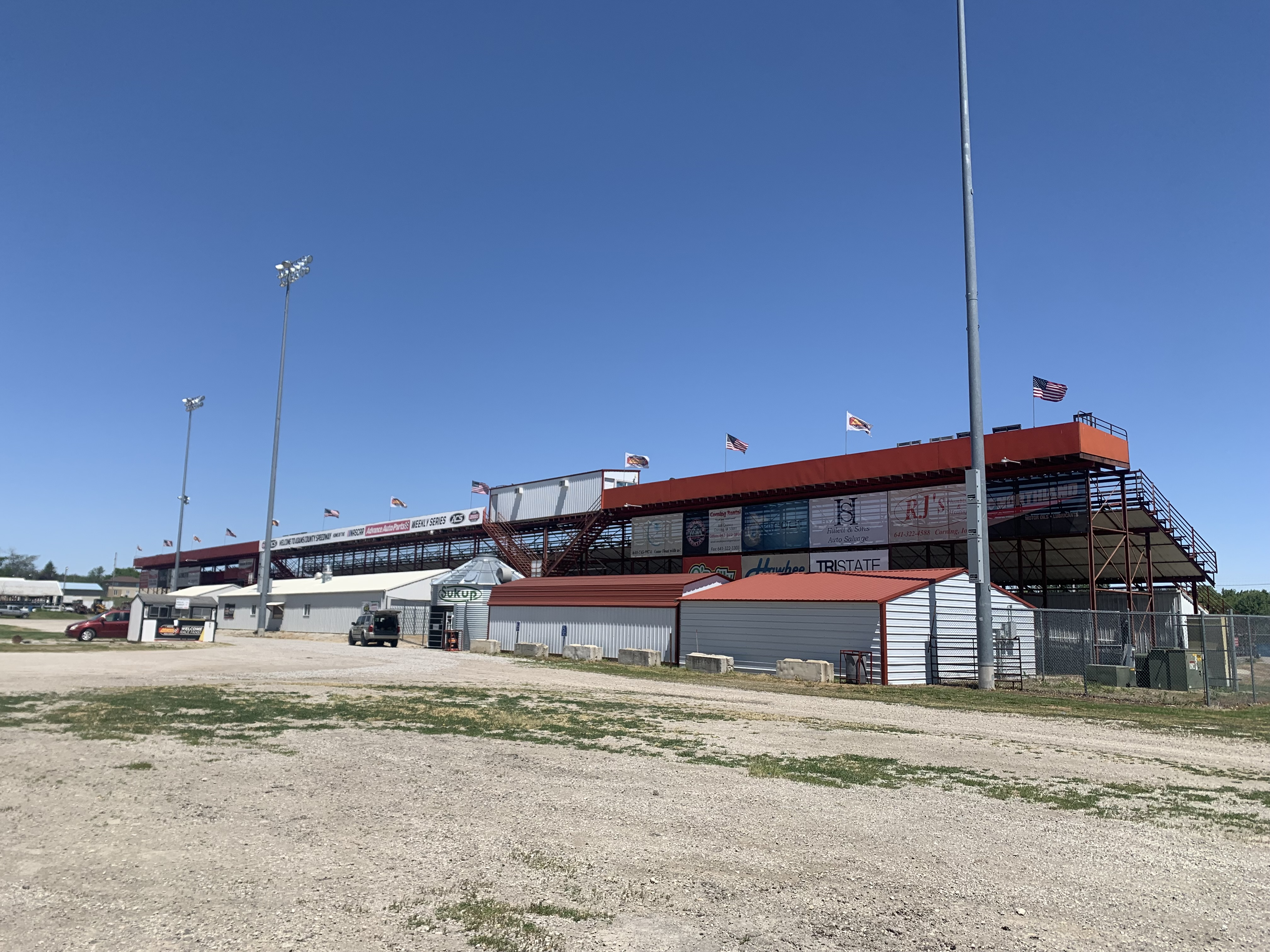
Adams County Speedway in Corning, Iowa

Lake Icaria is a 650-acre man-made lake, four miles north of Corning on Iowa Highway 148. The lake has a beach, marina, playgrounds, picnic shelters, cabins, primitive campground, non-primitive campground, and numerous nature trails. Lake Icaria offers great fishing with largemouth bass, bluegill, crappie, channel catfish, perch, walleye, and wiper. Boating and camping are very popular, bringing in visitors from all over Iowa, Missouri and Nebraska. A smaller lake, Lake Binder, is located one mile east of Corning and offers a quieter setting for camping and fishing.

Two of the Nodaway River's tributaries run through the area; the East Nodaway River flows through Corning and the Middle Nodaway River runs four miles north of town and through Carbon. Both rivers are popular kayaking and tubing spots in the summer months and have river entry.

== Geography ==
According to the United States Census Bureau, the city has a total area of 1.58 square miles (4.09 km^{2}), all land.

=== Climate ===
According to the Köppen Climate Classification system, Corning has a hot-summer humid continental climate, abbreviated "Dfa" on climate maps.

Climate data for Corning, Iowa, 1991–2020 normals, extremes 1893–present
Month	Jan	Feb	Mar	Apr	May	Jun	Jul	Aug	Sep	Oct	Nov	Dec	Year
Record high °F (°C)	68 (20)	79 (26)	88 (31)	93 (34)	103 (39)	106 (41)	115 (46)	112 (44)	104 (40)	94 (34)	82 (28)	70 (21)	115 (46)
Mean maximum °F (°C)	53.8 (12.1)	58.1 (14.5)	73.1 (22.8)	83.2 (28.4)	87.2 (30.7)	90.7 (32.6)	93.9 (34.4)	93.0 (33.9)	89.4 (31.9)	83.1 (28.4)	69.7 (20.9)	57.3 (14.1)	95.3 (35.2)
Mean daily maximum °F (°C)	31.4 (−0.3)	36.6 (2.6)	49.2 (9.6)	61.4 (16.3)	71.3 (21.8)	80.8 (27.1)	84.8 (29.3)	83.3 (28.5)	76.4 (24.7)	64.0 (17.8)	48.8 (9.3)	36.4 (2.4)	60.4 (15.8)
Daily mean °F (°C)	21.7 (−5.7)	26.1 (−3.3)	37.8 (3.2)	48.9 (9.4)	60.1 (15.6)	70.0 (21.1)	74.2 (23.4)	72.3 (22.4)	64.3 (17.9)	52.0 (11.1)	38.1 (3.4)	26.9 (−2.8)	49.4 (9.6)
Mean daily minimum °F (°C)	12.0 (−11.1)	15.7 (−9.1)	26.5 (−3.1)	36.5 (2.5)	48.9 (9.4)	59.2 (15.1)	63.6 (17.6)	61.2 (16.2)	52.3 (11.3)	40.0 (4.4)	27.4 (−2.6)	17.5 (−8.1)	38.4 (3.5)
Mean minimum °F (°C)	−10.3 (−23.5)	−3.6 (−19.8)	7.3 (−13.7)	21.1 (−6.1)	35.4 (1.9)	46.9 (8.3)	53.9 (12.2)	51.2 (10.7)	37.0 (2.8)	24.7 (−4.1)	10.5 (−11.9)	−2.0 (−18.9)	−13.0 (−25.0)
Record low °F (°C)	−32 (−36)	−32 (−36)	−22 (−30)	3 (−16)	21 (−6)	34 (1)	42 (6)	34 (1)	20 (−7)	−3 (−19)	−14 (−26)	−32 (−36)	−32 (−36)
Average precipitation inches (mm)	0.84 (21)	1.20 (30)	2.08 (53)	3.44 (87)	5.15 (131)	5.16 (131)	4.00 (102)	3.82 (97)	3.50 (89)	2.80 (71)	1.86 (47)	1.43 (36)	35.28 (895)
Average snowfall inches (cm)	8.2 (21)	6.2 (16)	3.3 (8.4)	1.2 (3.0)	0.0 (0.0)	0.0 (0.0)	0.0 (0.0)	0.0 (0.0)	0.0 (0.0)	0.4 (1.0)	1.6 (4.1)	6.9 (18)	27.8 (71.5)
Average precipitation days (≥ 0.01 in)	5.5	5.8	7.0	9.9	11.8	10.3	8.2	7.9	7.0	7.5	5.7	5.5	92.1
Average snowy days (≥ 0.1 in)	3.6	3.1	1.4	0.5	0.0	0.0	0.0	0.0	0.0	0.2	1.0	3.3	13.1
Source 1: NOAA
Source 2: National Weather Service

== Demographics ==
Historical population
Year	Pop.	±%
1880	1,526	—
1890	1,682	+10.2%
1900	2,145	+27.5%
1910	1,702	−20.7%
1920	1,840	+8.1%
1930	2,026	+10.1%
1940	2,162	+6.7%
1950	2,104	−2.7%
1960	2,041	−3.0%
1970	2,095	+2.6%
1980	1,939	−7.4%
1990	1,806	−6.9%
2000	1,783	−1.3%
2010	1,635	−8.3%
2020	1,564	−4.3%
Source: "U.S. Census website". United States Census Bureau. Source: U.S. Decennial Census

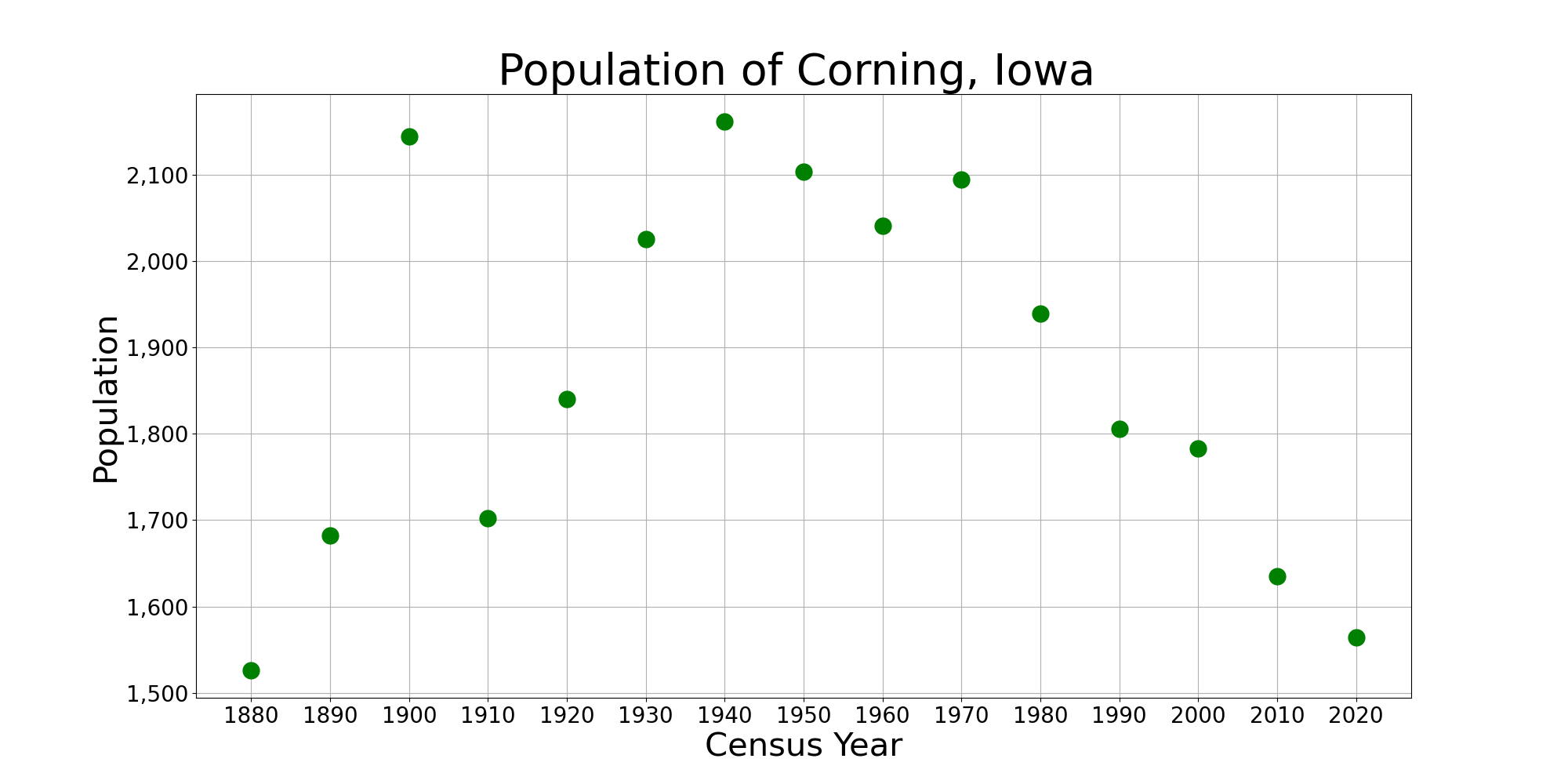
The population of Corning, Iowa from US census data

=== 2020 census ===
As of the 2020 census, Corning had a population of 1,564, with 700 households and 391 families residing in the city.

The median age was 43.9 years. 23.7% of residents were under the age of 20, including 21.7% who were under the age of 18. 4.5% were between the ages of 20 and 24, 23.1% were from 25 to 44, 25.8% were from 45 to 64, and 23.0% were 65 years of age or older. For every 100 females, there were 88.9 males, and for every 100 females age 18 and over there were 86.6 males age 18 and over. The gender makeup of the city was 47.1% male and 52.9% female.

Of the 700 households, 24.7% had children under the age of 18 living with them, 41.7% were married-couple households, 7.6% were cohabitating couples, 31.6% were households with a female householder and no spouse or partner present, and 19.1% were households with a male householder and no spouse or partner present. 44.1% of households were non-families, 38.0% of all households were made up of individuals, and 20.0% had someone living alone who was 65 years of age or older.

The population density was 1,003.7 inhabitants per square mile (387.5/km^{2}). There were 817 housing units at an average density of 524.3 per square mile (202.4/km^{2}). Of all housing units, 14.3% were vacant; the homeowner vacancy rate was 0.6% and the rental vacancy rate was 12.7%. 0.0% of residents lived in urban areas, while 100.0% lived in rural areas.

Racial composition as of the 2020 census
Race	Number	Percent
White	1,481	94.7%
Black or African American	6	0.4%
American Indian and Alaska Native	6	0.4%
Asian	10	0.6%
Native Hawaiian and Other Pacific Islander	0	0.0%
Some other race	13	0.8%
Two or more races	48	3.1%
Hispanic or Latino (of any race)	16	1.0%

=== 2010 census ===
As of the census of 2010, there were 1,635 people, 725 households, and 427 families residing in the city. The population density was 1,034.8 inhabitants per square mile (399.5/km^{2}). There were 849 housing units at an average density of 537.3 per square mile (207.5/km^{2}). The racial makeup of the city was 98.2% White, 0.1% African American, 0.2% Native American, 0.9% Asian, and 0.6% from two or more races. Hispanic or Latino of any race were 0.8% of the population.

There were 725 households, of which 25.8% had children under the age of 18 living with them, 47.0% were married couples living together, 7.7% had a female householder with no husband present, 4.1% had a male householder with no wife present, and 41.1% were non-families. 36.0% of all households were made up of individuals, and 19.3% had someone living alone who was 65 years of age or older. The average household size was 2.17 and the average family size was 2.80.

The median age in the city was 45.3 years. 21.2% of residents were under the age of 18; 7.3% were between the ages of 18 and 24; 21.2% were from 25 to 44; 26.2% were from 45 to 64; and 24.1% were 65 years of age or older. The gender makeup of the city was 46.9% male and 53.1% female.

=== 2000 census ===
As of the census of 2000, there were 1,783 people, 803 households, and 452 families residing in the city. The population density was 1,132.3 inhabitants per square mile (437.2/km^{2}). There were 880 housing units at an average density of 558.9 per square mile (215.8/km^{2}). The racial makeup of the city was 99.16% White, 0.17% African American, 0.22% Asian, 0.11% from other races, and 0.34% from two or more races. Hispanic or Latino of any race were 0.73% of the population.

There were 803 households, out of which 24.3% had children under the age of 18 living with them, 46.9% were married couples living together, 6.7% had a female householder with no husband present, 4.1% were single, and 43.6% were non-families. 39.6% of all households were made up of individuals, and 24.4% had someone living alone who was 65 years of age or older. The average household size was 2.14 and the average family size was 2.87.

Age spread: 22.5% under the age of 18, 6.8% from 18 to 24, 24.5% from 25 to 44, 20.1% from 45 to 64, and 26.0% who were 65 years of age or older. The median age was 42 years. For every 100 females, there were 83.1 males. For every 100 females age 18 and over, there were 79.8 males.

The median income for a household in the city was $28,977, and the median income for a family was $45,227. Males had a median income of $26,667 versus $19,569 for females. The per capita income for the city was $15,836. About 5.0% of families and 7.5% of the population were below the poverty line, including 8.5% of those under age 18 and 9.7% of those age 65 or over.

== Education ==
Public education for elementary and secondary school students is provided by the local school district Corning Community Schools. The school system, as of 2013, began whole grade sharing with the nearby Villisca Community School District, and the Corning district operates jointly with the Villisca district, Southwest Valley High School, with the mascot being the Timberwolf. Students completing their studies previously graduated from Corning High School. The school's mascot and athletic emblem were the Red Raiders.

== Notable people ==
- Byron Barr, actor who starred in Double Indemnity and Tokyo Rose
- Johnny Carson, American talk show host and comedian, was born in Corning.
- Horace Mann Towner, United States Representative from Iowa's 8th congressional district
- Daniel Webster Turner, Governor of Iowa from 1931–1933.
