= Strand, Iowa =

- Unincorporated community
- Location within Iowa
- Coordinates: 41°04′20″N 94°54′07″W
- Country: United States
- State: Iowa
- County: Adams
- Elevation: 1,217 ft (371 m)
- Time zone: UTC-6 (Central (CST))
  - Summer (DST): UTC-5 (CDT)
- Area code: 641
- GNIS feature ID: 464290

Strand was an unincorporated community in Adams County, Iowa, United States.

== History ==
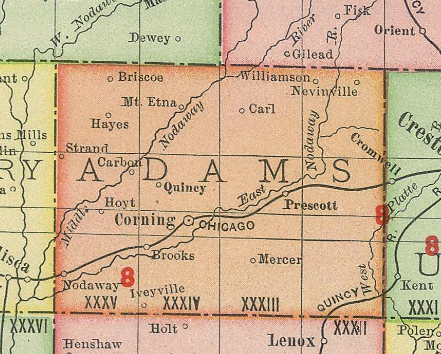
Strand, Iowa, appears on the 1903 Rand McNally map of Iowa.

The community of Strand was founded by Norwegian settlers. The Strand Lutheran Church began services on May 21, 1875, and still has an active congregation today; in 1998, the Strand Church had 121 members.

The post office at Strand was established in 1889, and operated until 1903 or 1909, closing with the introduction of rural free delivery.

The Lovig Store in Strand operated in the late 1800s, and changed hands in 1895.

Strand's population was 28 in 1902, and 25 in 1924.

Strand appeared on some maps of Iowa in the early 20th century, but the community went into decline; the church and cemetery remain.
