= Quincy, Iowa =

- Unincorporated community
- Location within Iowa
- Coordinates: 41°02′25″N 94°47′25″W
- Country: United States
- State: Iowa
- County: Adams
- Elevation: 1,289 ft (393 m)
- Time zone: UTC-6 (Central (CST))
  - Summer (DST): UTC-5 (CDT)
- Area code: 641
- GNIS feature ID: 464710

Quincy is an unincorporated community in Adams County, Iowa, United States.

== History ==
A post office was opened in Quincy in 1855, and remained in operation until it was discontinued in 1900. Quincy's population was 108 in 1902, and 50 in 1925.

Quincy once served as the county seat.

The population of Quincy was 45 in 1940.
