= Jasper Township, Adams County, Iowa =

Township in Iowa, US

Jasper Township, Adams County
- Township
- Coordinates: 40°56′41″N 094°45′45″W
- Country: United States
- State: Iowa
- County: Adams

Area
  - Total: 35.60 sq mi (92.21 km^{2})
  - Land: 35.54 sq mi (92.04 km^{2})
  - Water: 0.066 sq mi (0.17 km^{2})
- Elevation: 1,201 ft (366 m)

Population (2010)
  - Total: 398
  - Density: 11/sq mi (4.3/km^{2})
- Time zone: UTC-6 (CST)
  - Summer (DST): UTC-5 (CDT)
- FIPS code: 19-92193
- GNIS feature ID: 0468125

Jasper Township is one of twelve townships in Adams County, Iowa, United States. At the 2010 census, its population was 398.

== Geography ==
Jasper Township encompasses an area of 35.6 square miles (92 km²) and has no incorporated settlements. According to the USGS, it is home to five cemeteries: Brooks, Calvary, Oak Hill, Old Brooks, and Prairie Rose.
