= West Nodaway River =

Stream in Iowa, U.S.

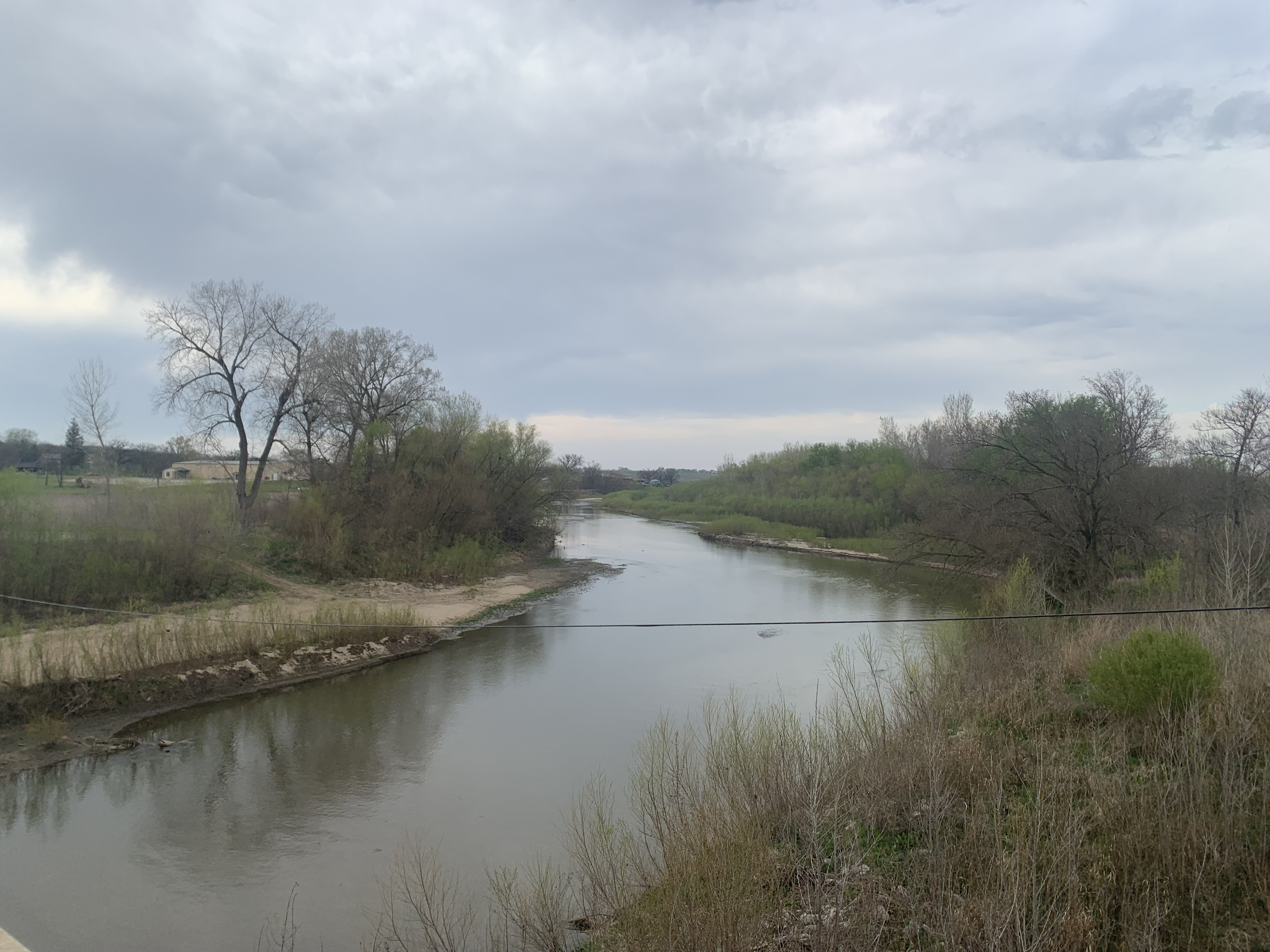
- The West Nodaway River at County Road J53 bridge east of Shambaugh

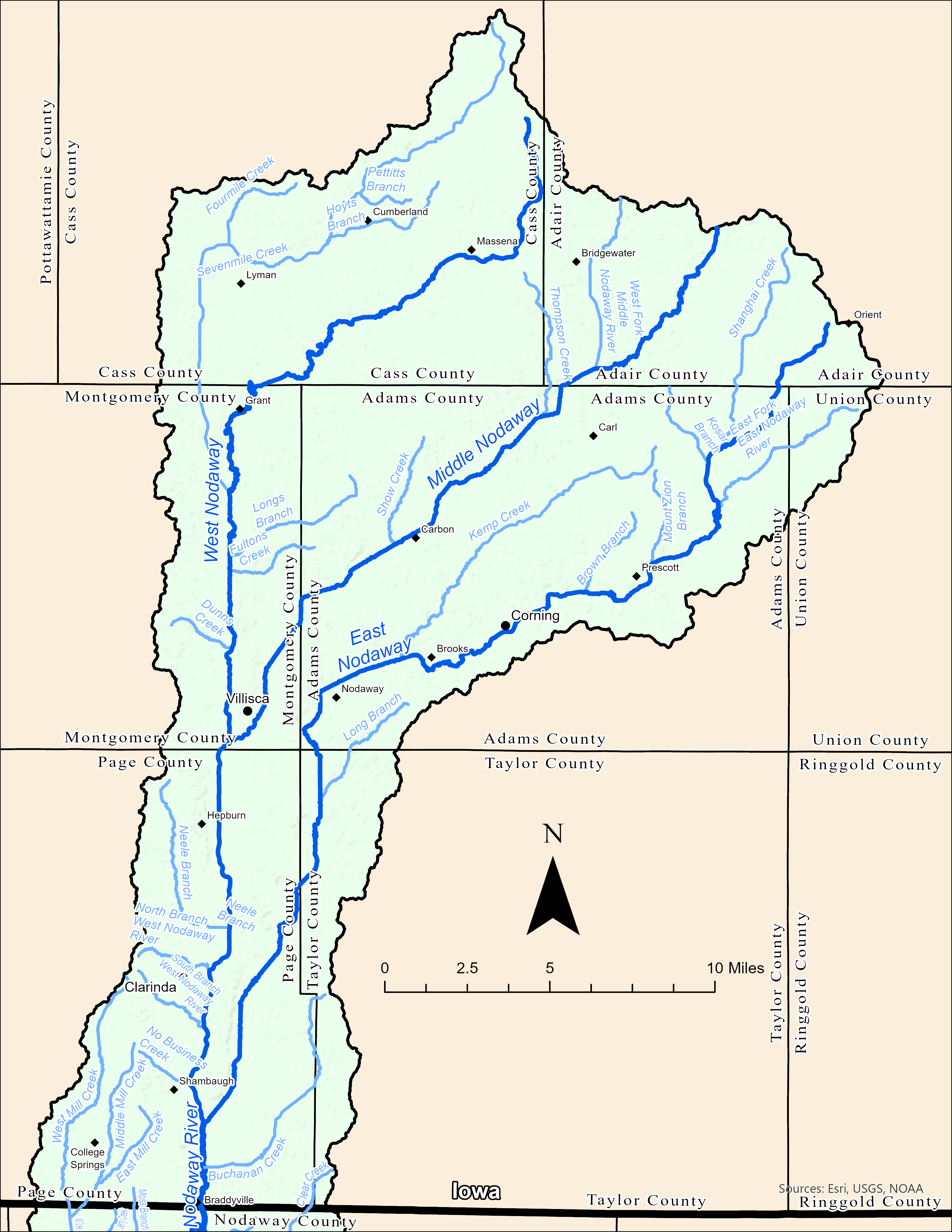
- Nodaway River watershed in Iowa; the West Nodaway River is to the left

Location
- Country: United States
- State: Iowa
- County: Cass, Montgomery, and Page

Physical characteristics
- Source
  - location: Lincoln Township
  - coordinates: 41°21′26″N 94°42′56″W
  - elevation: 1,370 ft (420 m)
- Mouth: Confluence with East Nodaway River to form the Nodaway River
  - location: Buchanan Township
  - coordinates: 40°38′06″N 95°01′09″W
  - elevation: 945 ft (288 m)
- Length: 73.5 mi (118.3 km)
- Basin size: 795 sq mi (2,060 km^{2})
- Width
  - average: 100ft
- Discharge
  - location: near Clarinda
  - average: 100 cu ft/s (2.8 m^{3}/s)
  - minimum: 1.3 cu ft/s (0.037 m^{3}/s)
  - maximum: 31,100 cu ft/s (880 m^{3}/s)

Basin features
- Progression: West Nodaway River → Nodaway River → Missouri River → Mississippi River → Atlantic Ocean
- Landmarks: Viking Lake State Park
- Stream gradient 5.6 ft/mi (1.06 m/km)

West Nodaway River is a stream in southwestern Iowa, in the United States. It is a tributary to the Nodaway River and is 73.5 miles long. It is considered the main tributary of the Nodaway River, and has historically and, to some degree presently, been known as the Nodaway River

The stream is monitored at two places, just east of Clarinda and just southeast of Massena and is considered a major water source by the Iowa DNR.

== Geography ==
West Nodaway River is the left tributary to the Nodaway River and joins it 4.3 miles before the Iowa-Missouri border. The West Nodaway River sources from Cass County and runs through Montgomery County before its confluence with the East Nodaway River in Page County. Its watershed also extends into Adair County and Adams County.

=== Communities ===
There are five cities along the West Nodaway River, listed from source to mouth: Massena, Grant, Villisca, Hepburn, Clarinda, and Shambaugh. There are five other communities within the watershed: Bridgewater, Carbon, Cumberland, Fontanelle, and Greenfield.

=== Course ===
The West Nodaway River arises from the hills of southwest Iowa about 8 miles northeast of Massena. It begins traveling southerly for about 8 miles, then its course changes to be southwesterly as it heads towards Grant, which it passes to the southeast. Then the river continues south alongside US 71, with much of it being channelized as it heads towards Villisca, but a few miles before reaching Villisca, it is fed by Viking Lake of Viking Lake State Park from Dunns Creek. After almost 16 miles, the stream passes Villisca to the west and joins with the Middle Nodaway River. 10 miles further south, it reaches Clarinda, the largest town in the Nodaway River watershed. The West Nodaway continues southerly another 7 miles south and passes Shambaugh to the east before joining with the East Nodaway River a few miles north of the Iowa-Missouri border.

=== Hydrology ===
There are 5 permitted wastewater treatment facility and 4 permitted point source discharges that flow into the West Nodaway River. There is one dam of the West Nodaway River in the northeast portion of Clarinda. The dam was built in 1958 and is 130 feet wide and 8 feet tall, and there have been at least 5 incidents of drownings around the dam.

==== Watershed ====
The West Nodaway River has the largest watershed in the Nodaway River system, being approximately 44% of the total Nodaway River watershed area. The West Nodaway, even without its major tributary, the Middle Nodaway River, is still the largest Nodaway River tributary by watershed, being 457 sq mi (1,180 km^{2}), while the East and Middle Nodaway rivers are 333.2 sq mi (863 km^{2}) and 338 sq mi (880 km^{2}) respectively.

==== Lakes ====
Viking Lake of Viking Lake State Park is the second largest lake in the Nodaway River system; it is located about 2 miles west of the West Nodaway, and its lake flows into the river via Dunns Creek. There are four other lakes in the West Nodaway River watershed: Greenfield Lake, Mormon Trail Lake, and Nodaway Lake, all in Adair County, and Schenck Lake in Page County.

=== Crossings ===
The West Nodaway is crossed by two US Highways, US 34 and US 71 twice; Bus. US 71 crosses the West Nodaway River in Clarinda. Two Iowa State Highways, Iowa 2 and Iowa 92 cross the West Nodaway River and 12 County Highways that cross it.

The California Zephyr Amtrak passenger railway crosses the West Nodaway River once west of Villisca.

=== Recreation ===
West Nodaway Wildlife Area is public land located along the West Nodaway River in south-central Cass County and provides direct fishing and boating access. Viking Lake State Park is the largest recreation area and only state park in the West Nodaway watershed. There are a few other parks located around the West Nodaway, namely: Nodaway Wildlife Area in Cass County, Pilot Grove Park, Hacklebarney Woods, Erickson Wildlife Area in Montgomery County, and Nodaway Valley Park in Page County. Tenville Canoe Access, six miles north of Villisca in Montgomery County, provides direct access to the river.

=== Tributaries ===
There are 30 named direct and indirect tributaries of the West Nodaway River.

- No Business Creek
- South Branch West Nodaway River
- North Branch West Nodaway River
- Neele Branch
- Wolf Run
- Middle Nodaway River
  - Tributaries of Middle Nodaway River
- Dunns Creek
- Fultons Creek
- Longs Branch
- Sin Creek
- Sevenmile Creek
  - Rose Creek
  - Fourmile Creek
  - Hoyts Branch
  - Pettitts Branch
- Threemile Creek
- Williams Creek
  - Petersons Creek
  - Moore Creek
- Prosser Creek
- Whistlers Creek
- Elm Creek

== See also ==
- Tributaries of the Nodaway River
- List of rivers of Iowa
