= Middle Nodaway River =

Stream in Iowa, U.S.

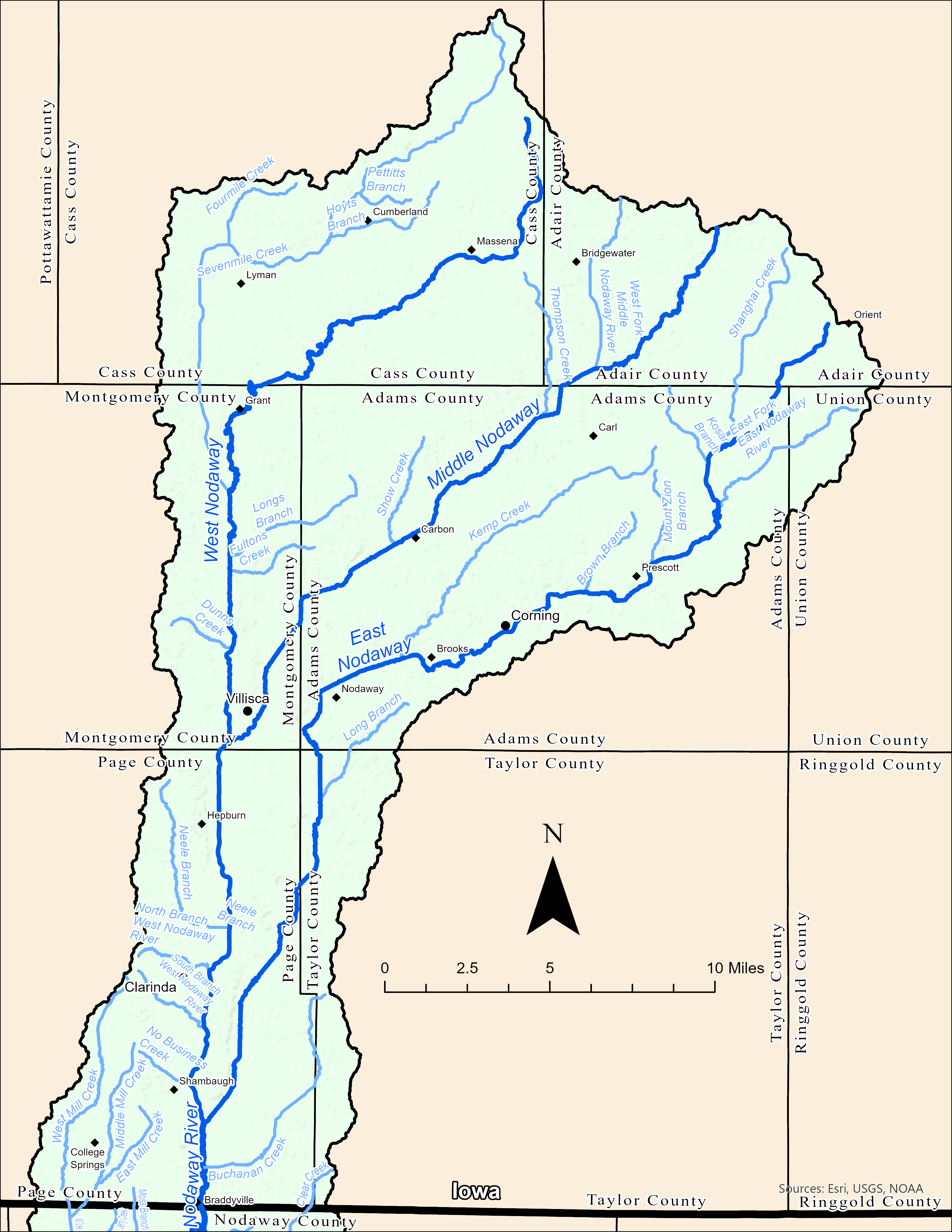
- Nodaway River watershed in Iowa; the Middle Nodaway River is in the middle

Location
- Country: United States
- State: Iowa
- County: Adair, Adams, and Montgomery

Physical characteristics
- Source
  - location: Walnut Township
  - coordinates: 41°27′44″N 94°33′02″W
  - elevation: 1,410 ft (430 m)
- Mouth: West Nodaway River
  - location: East Township
  - coordinates: 40°54′17″N 94°59′55″W
  - elevation: 1,007 ft (307 m)
- Length: 59.5 mi (95.8 km)
- Basin size: 338 sq mi (880 km^{2})

Basin features
- Progression: Middle Nodaway River → West Nodaway River → Nodaway River → Missouri River → Mississippi River → Atlantic Ocean
- Stream gradient 6.2 ft/mi (1.17 m/km)

Middle Nodaway River is a stream in southwestern Iowa, in the United States. It is an indirect tributary to the Nodaway River via the West Nodaway River. It is 59.5 miles long. It is considered a major water source by the Iowa DNR.

== History ==
From 1969 to 1977, the USGS monitored the Middle Nodaway River at Villisca. In 2016, a Fish and Benthic Macroinvertebrate Survey took place near Bridgewater sponsored by the Iowa DNR. The results were a FIBI grade of fair. In March 2024, a diesel spill occurred in the Middle Nodaway in Adair County, no dead fish were reported. In May 2024, heavy precipitation caused a discharge of untreated wastewater from Fontanelle to flow into the Middle Nodaway.

== Geography ==
Middle Nodaway River is the left tributary to the West Nodaway River. Most of the Middle Nodaway is located in Adair County and Adams County, with a small portion of the river being in Montgomery County near its mouth. The Middle Nodaway's watershed also extends into Cass County. The West Fork Middle Nodaway River rises the furthest north of any stream in the Nodaway River watershed.

=== Communities ===
Greenfield and Villisca are the largest cities along the Middle Nodaway, with Greenfield located near its source and Villisca at its mouth. There are two other villages located along the river, Carbon and Fontanelle. Bridgewater is located in the watershed along the West Fork of the river.

=== Course ===
The Middle Nodaway River begins in northern Adair County, about 3.5 south-southwest of Casey, then it continues south-southeast for about 12 miles to a point 2 miles west of Greenfield. After being fed by Nodaway Lake and Greenfield Lake just outside Greenfield, it departs southwest traveling for 24 miles before passing just northwest of Carbon. It continues another 11 miles southwesterly before passing Villisca and two miles further southwest it joins with the West Nodaway River.

=== Hydrology ===
There are three lakes located in the Middle Nodaway watershed: Greenfield Lake, Mormon Trail Lake, and Nodaway Lake, all in Adair County. There are 15 permitted wastewater treatment facility and 24 permitted point source discharges that flow into the Middle Nodaway River or its tributaries.

=== Tributaries ===
There are 8 named direct and indirect tributaries of the Middle Nodaway River: Wolf Run, Show Creek, Bull Creek, Thompson Creek, West Fork Middle Nodaway River, Rutt Branch, and Ninemile Creek.

=== Crossings ===
Two US Highways cross the Middle Nodaway, US 34 and US 71, and two Iowa State Highways cross it as well, Iowa 92 and Iowa 148. There are 12 County Highways that cross it.

The California Zephyr Amtrak passenger railway crosses the Middle Nodaway River once near Villisca.

=== Recreation ===
There are four tracts of public land located in the Middle Nodaway River watershed, all of which are in Adair County. The two along the Middle Nodaway are E. Rex Sullivan Wildlife Area and Ken Sidey Nature Area, and the two others in the watershed are Mormon Trail Park and Adair Wildlife Management Area.

== See also ==
- Tributaries of the Nodaway River
- List of rivers of Iowa
