= Massena, Iowa =

Massena
- City
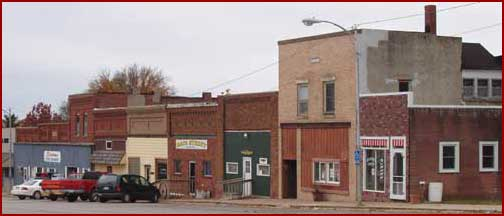
- East Main Street in Massena
- Motto: "Home of Friendly People"
- Location in the State of Iowa
- Coordinates: 41°14′55″N 94°46′12″W
- Country: USA
- State: Iowa
- County: Cass
- Established: 1886

Area
  - Total: 0.68 sq mi (1.77 km^{2})
  - Land: 0.68 sq mi (1.77 km^{2})
  - Water: 0 sq mi (0.00 km^{2})
- Elevation: 1,217 ft (371 m)

Population (2020)
  - Total: 359
  - Density: 524.3/sq mi (202.43/km^{2})
- Time zone: UTC-6 (CST)
  - Summer (DST): UTC-5 (CDT)
- ZIP code: 50853
- Area code: 712
- FIPS code: 19-50250
- GNIS feature ID: 2395042
- Website: http://cityofmassena.org/

Massena is a city in Cass County, Iowa, United States. The population was 359 at the time of the 2020 census. The town's motto is: "The Home of Friendly People" and its sister community in the county is the small city of Cumberland. Massena is named after Massena, New York.

== Geography ==
Massena is located among the rolling hills of Iowa at the intersection of Iowa highways 92 and 148.

According to the United States Census Bureau, the city has a total area of 0.69 square miles (1.79 km^{2}), all land. Massena is located approximately halfway between Des Moines and Omaha, Nebraska, 15 miles south of Interstate 80.

== Demographics ==
Historical populations
Year	Pop.	±%
1890	279	—
1900	475	+70.3%
1910	490	+3.2%
1920	500	+2.0%
1930	475	−5.0%
1940	479	+0.8%
1950	459	−4.2%
1960	456	−0.7%
1970	433	−5.0%
1980	518	+19.6%
1990	372	−28.2%
2000	414	+11.3%
2010	355	−14.3%
2020	359	+1.1%
Source:"U.S. Census website". United States Census Bureau. and Iowa Data Center; Source: U.S. Decennial Census

=== 2020 census ===
As of the census of 2020, there were 359 people, 150 households, and 90 families residing in the city. The population density was 524.3 inhabitants per square mile (202.4/km^{2}). There were 177 housing units at an average density of 258.5 per square mile (99.8/km^{2}). The racial makeup of the city was 93.3% White, 0.0% Black or African American, 0.0% Native American, 0.8% Asian, 0.3% Pacific Islander, 0.8% from other races and 4.7% from two or more races. Hispanic or Latino persons of any race comprised 0.8% of the population.

Of the 150 households, 29.3% of which had children under the age of 18 living with them, 48.0% were married couples living together, 6.7% were cohabitating couples, 25.3% had a female householder with no spouse or partner present and 20.0% had a male householder with no spouse or partner present. 40.0% of all households were non-families. 38.0% of all households were made up of individuals, 18.0% had someone living alone who was 65 years old or older.

The median age in the city was 39.9 years. 29.5% of the residents were under the age of 20; 3.3% were between the ages of 20 and 24; 22.8% were from 25 and 44; 24.2% were from 45 and 64; and 20.1% were 65 years of age or older. The gender makeup of the city was 52.4% male and 47.6% female.

=== 2010 census ===
As of the census of 2010, there were 355 people, 161 households, and 97 families residing in the city. The population density was 514.5 inhabitants per square mile (198.6/km^{2}). There were 191 housing units at an average density of 276.8 units per square mile (106.9 units/km^{2}). The racial makeup of the city was 99.4% White, 0.3% African American, and 0.3% from other races. Hispanic or Latino of any race were 2.8% of the population.

There were 161 households, of which 24.2% had children under the age of 18 living with them, 50.3% were married couples living together, 9.3% had a female householder with no husband present, 0.6% had a male householder with no wife present, and 39.8% were non-families. 34.8% of all households were made up of individuals, and 17.4% had someone living alone who was 65 years of age or older. The average household size was 2.20 and the average family size was 2.91.

The median age in the city was 44.3 years. 24.2% of residents were under the age of 18; 5.7% were between the ages of 18 and 24; 20.7% were from 25 to 44; 30.1% were from 45 to 64; and 19.4% were 65 years of age or older. The gender makeup of the city was 50.4% male and 49.6% female.

=== 2000 census ===
As of the census of 2000, there were 414 people, 182 households, and 113 families residing in the city. The population density was 595.3 inhabitants per square mile (229.8/km^{2}). There were 193 housing units at an average density of 277.5 units per square mile (107.1 units/km^{2}). The racial makeup of the city was 99.76% White (413 people), and 0.24% from two or more races (1 person). Hispanic or Latino of any race were 0.24% of the population (1 person).

There were 182 households, out of which 25.8% had children under the age of 18 living with them, 53.3% were married couples living together, 5.5% had a female householder with no husband present, and 37.4% were non-families. 34.1% of all households were made up of individuals, and 22.0% had someone living alone who was 65 years of age or older. The average household size was 2.27 and the average family size was 2.88.

In the city, the population was spread out, with 23.2% under the age of 18, 7.5% from 18 to 24, 25.8% from 25 to 44, 22.2% from 45 to 64, and 21.3% who were 65 years of age or older. The median age was 41 years. For every 100 females, there were 97.1 males. For every 100 females age 18 and over, there were 90.4 males.

The median income for a household in the city was $30,625, and the median income for a family was $43,173. Males had a median income of $31,319 versus $20,909 for females. The per capita income for the city was $15,012. About 8.4% of families and 10.6% of the population were below the poverty line, including 11.4% of those under age 18 and 10.0% of those age 65 or over.

== History ==
The city of Massena was platted by the Chicago, Burlington and Quincy Railroad on land purchased from A. Vredenburgh in 1883 and 1884 that included most of Section 33 of Cass County. The incorporated city was platted in 1886. The first meeting of the city council was on March 21, 1887, and a special election was held on December 10, 1887, to enlarge the corporate limits to include all of section 33. The city was platted with the name of "Smith", but the post office authorities refused the name because of another city with a similar spelling.

Lume A. Stone, an American Civil War soldier from Massena, New York, suggested Massena after his hometown, and thus the name of the township and town. Massena, New York was named after a French Marshal under Napoleon, André Masséna.

== Culture ==
The Massena Historical Society restored, maintains and gives tours of a country schoolhouse, a barber shop and a filling station. The country schoolhouse, Victoria No. 8, was brought into town from Victoria Township. Every 3 July the local volunteer fire department sponsors a street dance on Main Street to raise money for the fire department funds. The annual Fontanelle & Massena Independence Day parade is alternated between Massena and the community of Fontanelle, Iowa. Baseball has a strong tradition in Massena. Massena's local team is the Massena Red Sox, formally the Cumberland Red Sox, which has been in existence since the 1920s.

== Education ==
CAM Community School District serves Massena.

Massena was home of the Massena School District until 1959 when it reorganized with the city of Cumberland, Iowa to create the C & M Community School District. In 2003, the C & M Community School District started whole grade sharing with the Anita Community School District of Anita, Iowa, going under the name of CAM for Cumberland, Anita and Massena.

C & M merged with Anita reorganized on July 1, 2011, to create the CAM District. Massena is currently the home of the CAM Elementary. CAM High School and CAM Middle School are located in Anita, Iowa.

== Business ==
Most of Massena's economy is based on agriculture. Many of the people from Massena are family farmers. Massena is also known as a bedroom community. It is located centrally between Atlantic, the county seat of Cass County, Greenfield, the county seat of Adair County and Corning, the county seat of Adams County. Many Massenans commute to these cities as well as others.

Massena has an ag co-op which runs a filling station. The town also has a John Deere service center, a bank, a hotel, a medical center, a tavern, a grocery store, two mechanics, a welder, a craft store and a sale barn. There is also a chiropractor, a massage therapist and several beauticians.

== Churches ==
The city of Massena is home to a Baptist Church, a United Methodist Church, and a Roman Catholic Church. St. Patrick Catholic Church serves the communities of Massena and Bridgewater, Iowa as well as part of the community of Cumberland, Iowa. St. Patrick is part of the Catholic Diocese of Des Moines. Two country churches hold a Massena address: St. Peter's United Church of Christ and Pine Grove United Methodist Church. A Christian church, Disciples of Christ, named Trinity, is located in the city of Bridgewater, Iowa. Trinity Christian Church serves the communities of Massena, Bridgewater and Cumberland.
