= Nodaway, Iowa =

- City
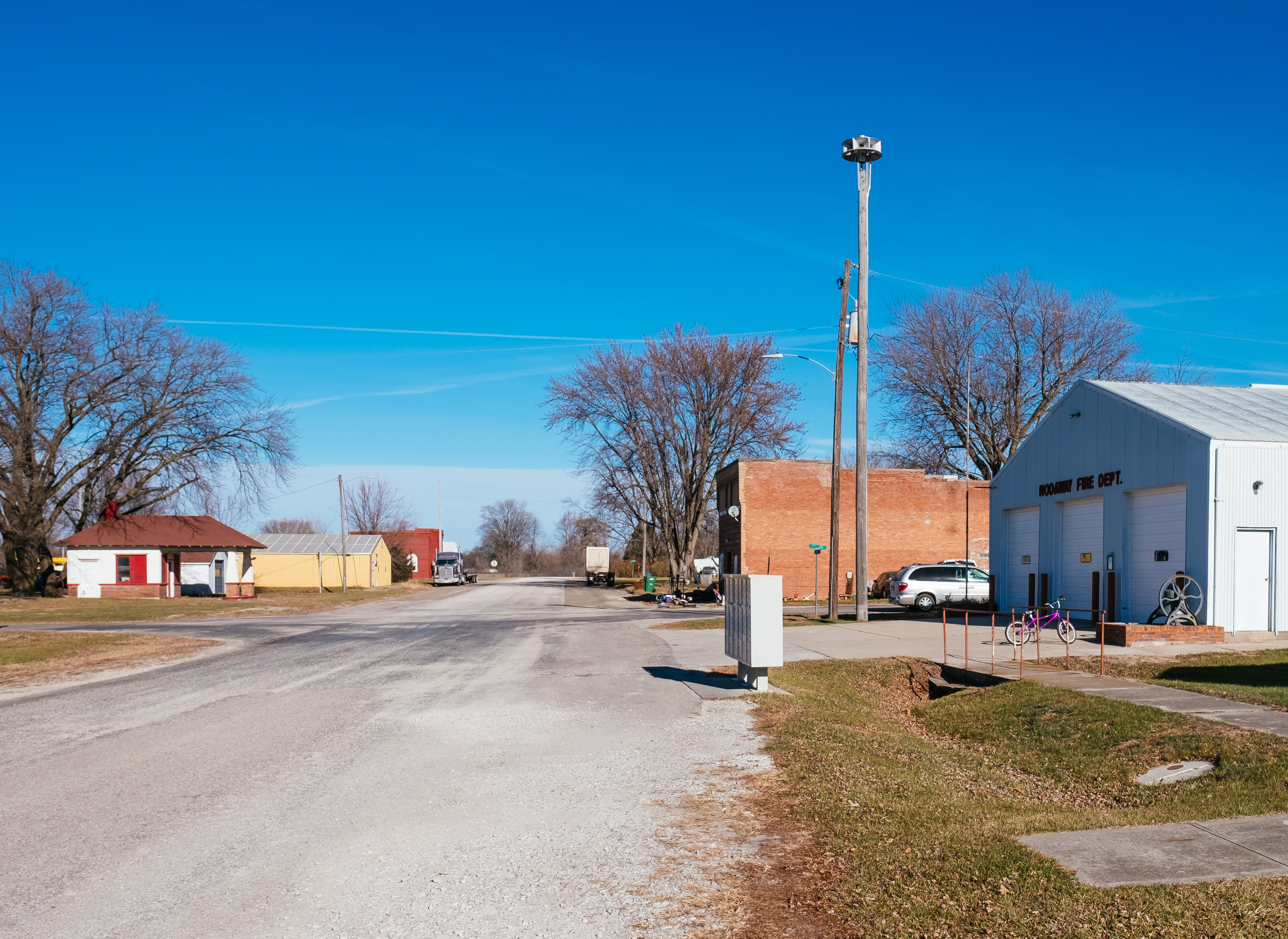
- Intersection of 3rd and Byerley Streets

- Location of Nodaway, Iowa
- Coordinates: 40°56′10″N 94°53′51″W
- Country: United States
- State: Iowa
- County: Adams
- Township: Nodaway
- Incorporated: May 28, 1900

Area
  - Total: 0.67 sq mi (1.73 km^{2})
  - Land: 0.67 sq mi (1.73 km^{2})
  - Water: 0 sq mi (0.00 km^{2})
- Elevation: 1,073 ft (327 m)

Population (2020)
  - Total: 74
  - Density: 110.6/sq mi (42.72/km^{2})
- Time zone: UTC-6 (Central (CST))
  - Summer (DST): UTC-5 (CDT)
- ZIP code: 50857
- Area code: 712
- FIPS code: 19-56865
- GNIS feature ID: 2395241

Nodaway is a city in Nodaway Township, Adams County, Iowa, United States. The population was 74 at the time of the 2020 census. Nodaway was incorporated on May 28, 1900.

== History ==
Nodaway was a shipping point on the Chicago, Burlington and Quincy Railroad.

== Geography ==
According to the United States Census Bureau, the city has a total area of 0.54 square miles (1.40 km^{2}), all land.

== Demographics ==
Historical populations
Year	Pop.	±%
1880	109	—
1890	142	+30.3%
1900	196	+38.0%
1910	323	+64.8%
1920	340	+5.3%
1930	334	−1.8%
1940	270	−19.2%
1950	233	−13.7%
1960	204	−12.4%
1970	176	−13.7%
1980	185	+5.1%
1990	153	−17.3%
2000	132	−13.7%
2010	114	−13.6%
2020	74	−35.1%
Source:"U.S. Census website". United States Census Bureau. and Iowa Data Center; Source: U.S. Decennial Census

=== 2020 census ===
As of the census of 2020, there were 74 people, 36 households, and 19 families residing in the city. The population density was 110.6 inhabitants per square mile (42.7/km^{2}). There were 49 housing units at an average density of 73.3 per square mile (28.3/km^{2}). The racial makeup of the city was 93.2% White, 1.4% Black or African American, 0.0% Native American, 0.0% Asian, 0.0% Pacific Islander, 1.4% from other races and 4.1% from two or more races. Hispanic or Latino persons of any race comprised 1.4% of the population.

Of the 36 households, 11.1% of which had children under the age of 18 living with them, 36.1% were married couples living together, 11.1% were cohabitating couples, 22.2% had a female householder with no spouse or partner present and 30.6% had a male householder with no spouse or partner present. 47.2% of all households were non-families. 36.1% of all households were made up of individuals, 19.4% had someone living alone who was 65 years old or older.

The median age in the city was 48.5 years. 24.3% of the residents were under the age of 20; 1.4% were between the ages of 20 and 24; 21.6% were from 25 and 44; 20.3% were from 45 and 64; and 32.4% were 65 years of age or older. The gender makeup of the city was 52.7% male and 47.3% female.

=== 2010 census ===
At the 2010 census there were 114 people in 47 households, including 31 families, in the city. The population density was 211.1 inhabitants per square mile (81.5/km^{2}). There were 62 housing units at an average density of 114.8 per square mile (44.3/km^{2}). The racial makup of the city was 98.2% White and 1.8% from two or more races.

Of the 47 households 27.7% had children under the age of 18 living with them, 51.1% were married couples living together, 8.5% had a female householder with no husband present, 6.4% had a male householder with no wife present, and 34.0% were non-families. 29.8% of households were one person and 10.6% were one person aged 65 or older. The average household size was 2.43 and the average family size was 3.00.

The median age was 39 years. 27.2% of residents were under the age of 18; 4.4% were between the ages of 18 and 24; 21.2% were from 25 to 44; 29% were from 45 to 64; and 18.4% were 65 or older. The gender makeup of the city was 50.0% male and 50.0% female.

=== 2000 census ===
As of the census of 2000, there were 132 people in 58 households, including 38 families, in the city. The population density was 254.0 inhabitants per square mile (98.1/km^{2}). There were 70 housing units at an average density of 134.7 per square mile (52.0/km^{2}). The racial makup of the city was 100.00% White.

Of the 58 households 29.3% had children under the age of 18 living with them, 56.9% were married couples living together, 6.9% had a female householder with no husband present, and 32.8% were non-families. 29.3% of households were one person and 22.4% were one person aged 65 or older. The average household size was 2.28 and the average family size was 2.77.

Age spread: 22.0% under the age of 18, 5.3% from 18 to 24, 18.2% from 25 to 44, 31.8% from 45 to 64, and 22.7% 65 or older. The median age was 48 years. For every 100 females, there were 94.1 males. For every 100 females age 18 and over, there were 94.3 males.

The median household income was $34,375 and the median family income was $34,792. Males had a median income of $31,750 versus $21,667 for females. The per capita income for the city was $16,722. There were 8.9% of families and 11.6% of the population living below the poverty line, including 26.1% of under eighteens and 12.5% of those over 64.

== Education ==
Nodaway is within the Villisca Community School District. Residents are zoned to Southwest Valley High School, operated by the Corning Community School District, and shared with the Villisca district as part of a grade-sharing agreement.
