= Douglas Township, Adams County, Iowa =

Township in Iowa, US

Douglas Township, Adams County
- Township
- Coordinates: 41°01′52″N 094°52′03″W
- Country: United States
- State: Iowa
- County: Adams

Area
  - Total: 34.83 sq mi (90.22 km^{2})
  - Land: 34.76 sq mi (90.04 km^{2})
  - Water: 0.069 sq mi (0.18 km^{2})
- Elevation: 1,079 ft (329 m)

Population (2010)
  - Total: 158
  - Density: 4.7/sq mi (1.8/km^{2})
- Time zone: UTC-6 (CST)
  - Summer (DST): UTC-5 (CDT)
- FIPS code: 19-91020
- GNIS feature ID: 0467722

Douglas Township is one of twelve townships in Adams County, Iowa, United States. At the 2010 census, its population was 158.

== Geography ==
Douglas Township covers an area of 34.83 square miles (90.2 km^{2}) and contains one incorporated settlement, Carbon. According to the USGS, it contains one cemetery, Thompson.
