= Jackson Township, Adair County, Iowa =

Township in Iowa, US

Jackson Township, Adair County
- Township
- Coordinates: 41°17′14″N 094°38′35″W
- Country: United States
- State: Iowa
- County: Adair

Area
  - Total: 35.96 sq mi (93.14 km^{2})
  - Land: 35.92 sq mi (93.03 km^{2})
  - Water: 0.042 sq mi (0.11 km^{2})
- Elevation: 1,217 ft (371 m)

Population (2010)
  - Total: 270
  - Density: 7.5/sq mi (2.9/km^{2})
- Time zone: UTC-6 (CST)
  - Summer (DST): UTC-5 (CDT)
- FIPS code: 19-92088
- GNIS feature ID: 0468090

Jackson Township is one of seventeen townships in Adair County, Iowa, USA. At the 2020 census, its population was 270.

== History ==
Jackson Township was organized in 1861.

== Geography ==
Jackson Township covers an area of 35.96 square miles (93.1 km^{2}) and contains one incorporated settlement, Bridgewater. According to the USGS, it contains three cemeteries: Bryant, Cears and Saint Mary's.
