= CAM Community School District =

Public school district in Cumberland, Anita, and Massena Iowa, United States

Coordinates: 41.451964°N 94.773126°W

Location
- Anita, Iowa Cass, Adair, Adams, and Audubon counties United States
- Coordinates: 41.451964, -94.773126

District information
- Type: Local school district
- Grades: K-12
- Established: 2011
- Superintendent: Paul Croghan
- Schools: 7
- Budget: $14,822,000 (2020-21)
- NCES District ID: 1905940

Students and staff
- Students: 1441 (2022-23)
- Teachers: 40.52 FTE
- Staff: 52.13 FTE
- Student–teacher ratio: 35.56
- Athletic conference: Rolling Valley
- District mascot: Cougars
- Colors: Royal Blue and Silver

Other information
- Website: www.camcougars.org

CAM Community School District (CAM CSD) is a rural public school district headquartered in Anita, Iowa. The district, which is mostly in Cass County, also has sections in Adair, Adams, and Audubon counties. It serves Anita, Cumberland, Massena, and Wiota.

It was formed on July 1, 2011, by the merger of the Anita Community School District and the C & M Community School District.

== Schools ==
The district operates five schools:

Secondary:

- CAM Middle and High School (Anita)

Primary:

- CAM Elementary School (Massena)

Online Schools:

- CAM Iowa Connections Academy Elementary (Anita)
- CAM Iowa Connections Academy Middle School (Anita)
- CAM Iowa Connections Academy High School (Anita)

== CAM High School ==
=== Athletics ===
The Cougars compete in the Rolling Valley Conference in the following sports:

- Baseball (boys)
- Basketball (boys and girls)
- Cross Country (boys and girls)
- Football (boys)
- Golf (boys and girls)
- Soccer (boys and girls)
- Softball (girls)
- Track and Field (boys and girls)
- Volleyball (girls)
- Wrestling (boys and girls)

== See also ==
- List of school districts in Iowa
- List of high schools in Iowa
