= Nodaway Township, Adams County, Iowa =

Township in Iowa, US

Nodaway Township, Adams County
- Township
- Coordinates: 40°56′46″N 094°52′22″W
- Country: United States
- State: Iowa
- County: Adams

Area
  - Total: 35.22 sq mi (91.22 km^{2})
  - Land: 35.2 sq mi (91.2 km^{2})
  - Water: 0.0039 sq mi (0.01 km^{2})
- Elevation: 1,080 ft (330 m)

Population (2010)
  - Total: 235
  - Density: 6.7/sq mi (2.6/km^{2})
- Time zone: UTC-6 (CST)
  - Summer (DST): UTC-5 (CDT)
- FIPS code: 19-93120
- GNIS feature ID: 0468445

Nodaway Township is one of twelve townships in Adams County, Iowa, United States. At the 2010 census, its population was 235.

== Geography ==
Nodaway Township covers an area of 35.22 square miles (91.2 km^{2}) and contains one incorporated settlement, Nodaway. According to the USGS, it contains three cemeteries: Baldwin, Methodist Grove and Nodaway.
