= Fontanelle, Iowa =

- City
- Logo
- Motto: "A Place To Call Home"
- Location of Fontanelle, Iowa
- Coordinates: 41°17′24″N 94°33′37″W
- Country: United States
- State: Iowa
- County: Adair
- Township: Summerset
- Founded: 1855
- Incorporated: August 23, 1871
- Founded by: James C. Gibbs
- Named after: Logan Fontanelle

Area
  - Total: 0.86 sq mi (2.22 km^{2})
  - Land: 0.86 sq mi (2.22 km^{2})
  - Water: 0 sq mi (0.00 km^{2})
- Elevation: 1,348 ft (411 m)

Population (2020)
  - Total: 676
  - Density: 789.2/sq mi (304.72/km^{2})
- Time zone: UTC-6 (Central (CST))
  - Summer (DST): UTC-5 (CDT)
- ZIP code: 50846
- Area code: 641
- FIPS code: 19-28290
- GNIS feature ID: 2394783
- Website: fontanelleia.org

Fontanelle is a city in Summerset Township, Adair County, Iowa, United States. The population was 676 at the time of the 2020 census.

Fontanelle's water tower, on 5th Street

== History ==
Fontanelle was platted in 1855, by New York state native James C. Gibbs (1820–1907), who followed the arrival of a transient named Collins. In the summer of that year, Gibbs purchased lots on the northeast of the city square where he constructed a large log cabin. He brought his family there to live. Gibbs ran a hotel out of the log cabin briefly. He died in 1907, aged 86, and is buried with his wife, Phoebe, in Fontanelle Cemetery.

On August 23, 1871, Fontanelle was officially incorporated as a city.

D. M. Valentine purchased lots immediately to the west of Gibbs', thus becoming the second settler.

The city is named for chief Logan Fontanelle of the Omaha tribe, son of the French fur trader Lucien Fontanelle of the American Fur Company and an Omaha tribeswoman.

== Geography ==
According to the United States Census Bureau, the city has a total area of 0.96 square miles (2.49 km^{2}), all land.

The town is located between the West fork and Main fork of the Middle Nodaway River along Iowa Highway 92.

== Demographics ==
Historical population
| Year | Pop. | ±% |
|---|---|---|
| 1880 | 563 | — |
| 1890 | 830 | +47.4% |
| 1900 | 853 | +2.8% |
| 1910 | 789 | −7.5% |
| 1920 | 869 | +10.1% |
| 1930 | 833 | −4.1% |
| 1940 | 797 | −4.3% |
| 1950 | 812 | +1.9% |
| 1960 | 729 | −10.2% |
| 1970 | 752 | +3.2% |
| 1980 | 805 | +7.0% |
| 1990 | 712 | −11.6% |
| 2000 | 692 | −2.8% |
| 2010 | 672 | −2.9% |
| 2020 | 676 | +0.6% |
Source:"American FactFinder". United States Census Bureau. and Iowa Data Center; Source: U.S. Decennial Census

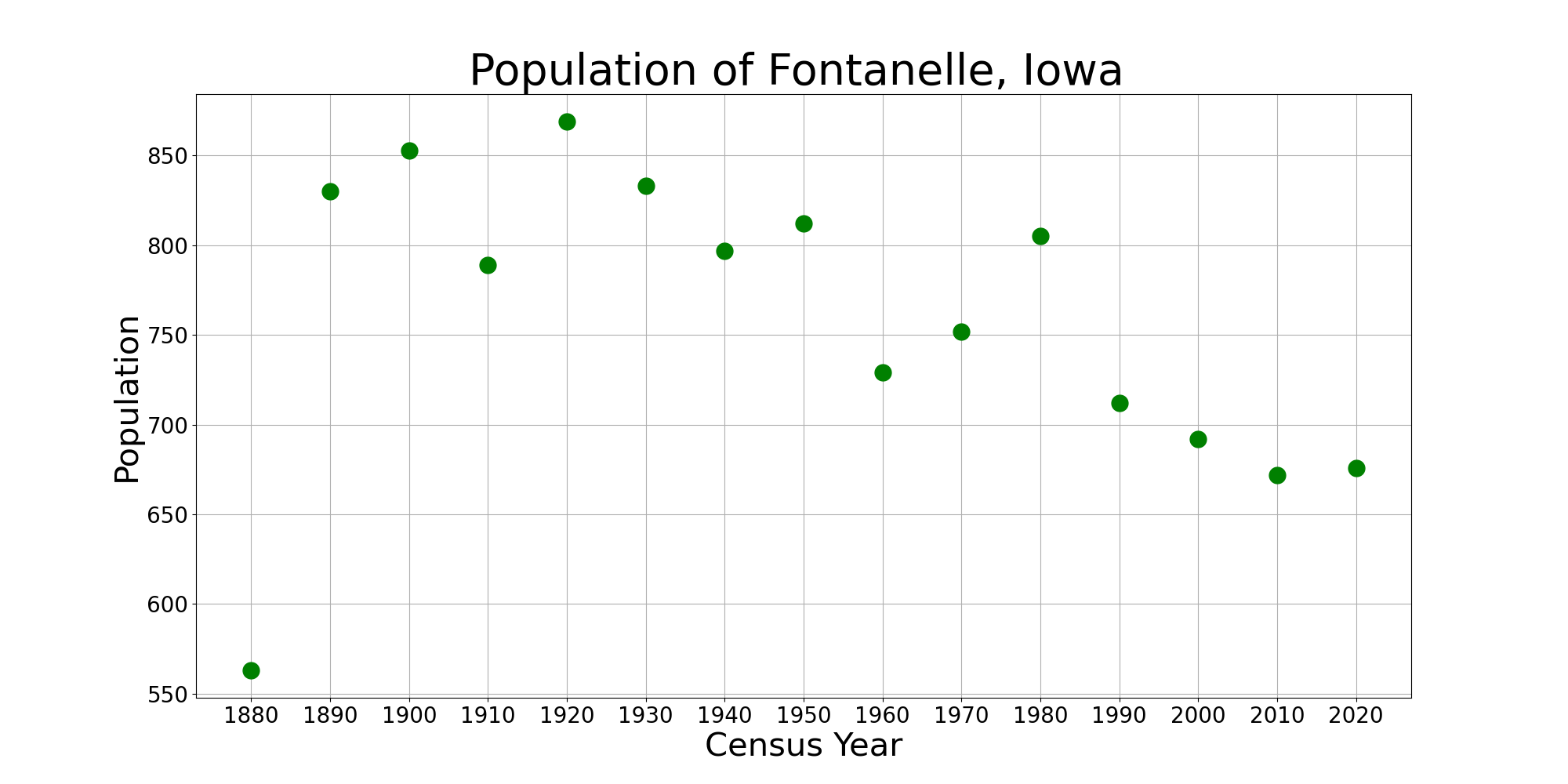
The population of Fontanelle, Iowa from US census data

=== 2020 census ===
As of the census of 2020, there were 676 people, 268 households, and 157 families residing in the city. The population density was 789.2 inhabitants per square mile (304.7/km^{2}). There were 313 housing units at an average density of 365.4 per square mile (141.1/km^{2}). The racial makeup of the city was 93.9% White, 1.0% Black or African American, 0.7% Native American, 0.4% Asian, 0.0% Pacific Islander, 0.0% from other races and 3.8% from two or more races. Hispanic or Latino persons of any race comprised 0.9% of the population.

Of the 268 households, 28.7% of which had children under the age of 18 living with them, 41.8% were married couples living together, 10.4% were cohabitating couples, 24.3% had a female householder with no spouse or partner present and 23.5% had a male householder with no spouse or partner present. 41.4% of all households were non-families. 34.7% of all households were made up of individuals, 16.4% had someone living alone who was 65 years old or older.

The median age in the city was 41.6 years. 26.6% of the residents were under the age of 20; 3.4% were between the ages of 20 and 24; 24.1% were from 25 and 44; 21.3% were from 45 and 64; and 24.6% were 65 years of age or older. The gender makeup of the city was 49.0% male and 51.0% female.

=== 2010 census ===
As of the census of 2010, there were 672 people, 304 households, and 164 families living in the city. The population density was 700.0 inhabitants per square mile (270.3/km^{2}). There were 336 housing units at an average density of 350.0 per square mile (135.1/km^{2}). The racial makeup of the city was 99.7% White, 0.1% from other races, and 0.1% from two or more races. Hispanic or Latino of any race were 0.6% of the population.

There were 304 households, of which 25.7% had children under the age of 18 living with them, 44.1% were married couples living together, 7.2% had a female householder with no husband present, 2.6% had a male householder with no wife present, and 46.1% were non-families. 41.4% of all households were made up of individuals, and 22.7% had someone living alone who was 65 years of age or older. The average household size was 2.11 and the average family size was 2.89.

The median age in the city was 48.2 years. 22.2% of residents were under the age of 18; 3.8% were between the ages of 18 and 24; 20.2% were from 25 to 44; 27.4% were from 45 to 64; and 26.3% were 65 years of age or older. The gender makeup of the city was 47.6% male and 52.4% female.

=== 2000 census ===
As of the census of 2000, there were 692 people, 305 households, and 186 families living in the city. The population density was 775.6 inhabitants per square mile (299.5/km^{2}). There were 328 housing units at an average density of 367.6 per square mile (141.9/km^{2}). The racial makeup of the city was 99.42% White, and 0.58% from two or more races. Hispanic or Latino of any race were 0.58% of the population.

There were 305 households, out of which 23.0% had children under the age of 18 living with them, 51.5% were married couples living together, 7.2% had a female householder with no husband present, and 38.7% were non-families. 35.1% of all households were made up of individuals, and 22.0% had someone living alone who was 65 years of age or older. The average household size was 2.11 and the average family size was 2.70.

20.2% were under the age of 18, 7.2% from 18 to 24, 19.4% from 25 to 44, 18.9% from 45 to 64, and 34.2% were 65 years of age or older. The median age was 48 years. For every 100 females, there were 76.5 males. For every 100 females age 18 and over, there were 76.4 males.

The median income for a household in the city was $31,328, and the median income for a family was $39,861. Males had a median income of $30,000 versus $20,550 for females. The per capita income for the city was $16,352. About 3.6% of families and 5.8% of the population were below the poverty line, including 10.7% of those under age 18 and 4.8% of those age 65 or over.

The office of The Fontanelle Observer, on 5th Street, pictured in 2019

== Education ==
Nodaway Valley Community School District serves the community. It was formed on July 1, 2000, by the consolidation of the districts of Greenfield and Bridgewater–Fontanelle. Nodaway Valley High School is the joint high school.

== Media ==
The city's newspaper is The Fontanelle Observer, which now has a page on the website of the Creston News Advertiser. The office of the Observer is on 5th Street.

Defunct newspapers include The Fontanelle Register (established in 1862) and The Fontanelle Reporter (1879).

== Churches ==
There are two churches in Fontanelle: a United Methodist and an Emmanuel Lutheran, established in 1874.

== Notable people ==
- Clel Baudler, politician
- Donald D. Clayton, astrophysicist
- Henry Winfield Haldeman, physician who practiced in the town
