= Summerset Township, Adair County, Iowa =

Township in Iowa, US

Summerset Township, Adair County
- Township
- Coordinates: 41°17′17″N 094°31′33″W
- Country: United States
- State: Iowa
- County: Adair

Area
  - Total: 35.81 sq mi (92.75 km^{2})
  - Land: 35.65 sq mi (92.34 km^{2})
  - Water: 0.16 sq mi (0.41 km^{2})
- Elevation: 1,260 ft (384 m)

Population (2010)
  - Total: 996
  - Density: 28/sq mi (10.8/km^{2})
- FIPS code: 19-94032
- GNIS feature ID: 0468759

Summerset Township is one of seventeen townships in Adair County, Iowa, USA. At the 2010 census, its population was 996.

== History ==
Summerset Township was organized in 1856.

== Geography ==
Summerset Township covers an area of 35.81 square miles (92.7 km^{2}) and contains one incorporated settlement, Fontanelle. According to the USGS, it contains one cemetery, Fontanelle.
