= The Fontanelle Observer =

Weekly newspaper in Fontanelle, Iowa

- Front page of The Fontanelle Observer from November 23, 2016
- Type: Weekly newspaper
- Owner: Shaw Media
- Publisher: Creston Publishing Company
- Founded: 5 December 1863 (162 years ago)
- Circulation: 220
- OCLC number: 12935821
- Website: crestonnews.com/fontanelle

The office of the newspaper, on 5th Street in Fontanelle, beside Fontanelle City Park, built in 1918 and pictured in 2019

The Fontanelle Observer is an American weekly newspaper focused on the news of Fontanelle, Iowa. It was founded in 1863 by the Gow brothers (which included James M. Gow). Its news is partly digitized via the website of the Creston News Advertiser.

== History ==
The newspaper passed to Indiana native Manley Albert Rany (1857–1914) in 1881. During his ownership, Will Pruitt also ran the paper under a lease for a few years.

William H. McClure became its owner and publisher in 1894, remaining in the role until 1915.

The newspaper was originally known as The Fontanelle Observer (1863–1883), then Fontanelle Weekly Observer (1883–1885), Fontanelle Observer (1885–1893) and The Observer (1893–1904). It has since reverted to its original name.

A fire destroyed the newspaper's office in early 1913. McClure was forced to use the presses of the Greenfield Transcript and the Adair News. The architect of today's incarnation, in 1918, was Ray Williamson of Creston. It is constructed of brick, hollow tile and cut stone with a floor space of 60 feet (18 m) by 24 feet (7.3 m).

The newspaper celebrated its centenary on December 5, 1963.

In 2017, Shaw Media purchased The Fontanelle Observer and Adair County Free Press.

== Editors and publishers ==
The newspaper's editors and publishers between 1904 and 1920:

- William H. McClure, April 14, 1904 to August 12, 1915
- William H. McClure and Sons, August 19, 1915 to March 20, 1919
- Don D. McClure, March 27, 1919 to December 30, 1920

== Online ==
Content for The Fontanelle Observer appears on the website of the Creston News Advertiser, which is owned by Shaw Media.
