= Nodaway Valley Community School District =

School district in Iowa

Coordinates: 41.311714°N 94.464702°W

Location
- Greenfield, Iowa Adair County and Madison County United States
- Coordinates: 41.311714, -94.464702

District information
- Type: Local school district
- Grades: K–12
- Established: 2000
- Superintendent: Paul Croghan
- Schools: 3
- Budget: $10,633,000 (2020-21)
- NCES District ID: 1913110

Students and staff
- Students: 621 (2022-23)
- Teachers: 49.45 FTE
- Staff: 55.25 FTE
- Student–teacher ratio: 12.56
- Athletic conference: Pride of Iowa
- District mascot: Wolverines
- Colors: Silver and purple

Other information
- Website: www.nodawayvalley.org

Nodaway Valley Community School District is a school district headquartered in Greenfield, Iowa, in the southwest of the state.

As of 2026 it includes sections of Adair County, with small sections of Madison County. It includes Greenfield, Bridgewater, and Fontanelle.

The district covers 283 square miles (730 km^{2}).

== History ==
It was formed on July 1, 2000, by the consolidation of the districts of Greenfield and Bridgewater–Fontanelle. Residents of the districts approved a referendum held on September 14, 1999, to consolidate.

In 2025, the Orient-Macksburg Community School District, scheduled to dissolve, closed its schools and began a whole grade sharing agreement (where a school district sends students to another school district's schools) with Nodaway Valley. The following year, on July 1, 2026, Orient-Macksburg dissolved, and Nodaway Valley took territory from the former district.

== Schools ==
- Nodaway Valley High School (Greenfield)
- Nodaway Valley Middle School (Fontanelle)
  - The building opened in 2000.
- Nodaway Valley Elementary School (Greenfield)
  - The current building opened in August 2017.

== Facts and figures ==
=== Enrollment ===
Year	District-wide	High schools	Middle schools	Elementary schools	Other programs & adjustments
2003–04	864	286	221	357	0
2002–03	883	295	225	363	0
