= Anita Community School District =

Former school district in Iowa

Anita Community School District was a school district headquartered in Anita, Iowa. The district occupied portions of Cass, Adair, and Audubon counties, and served Anita and Wiota.

Circa 2002 it began a "grade sharing" arrangement with the C & M Community School District, in which the districts sent each other's students to their schools. The Anita district operated the high school while the C&M district operated the middle school; both districts had their own elementary schools. The Anita district had about 272 students in the 2008–2009 school year.

On July 1, 2011, the Anita district merged with the C & M district to form the CAM Community School District.
