= Frank Fernando Jones =

American politician and businessman (1855–1941)

- Born: August 26, 1855; Bath, New York
- Died: January 29, 1941 (aged 85); Villisca, Iowa
- Occupations: Politician, businessman
- Known for: Villisca axe murders suspect

Frank Fernando Jones (August 26, 1855 – January 29, 1941) was an American politician and businessman.

Born near Bath, New York, Jones moved with his parents to Princeton, Illinois. He graduated from high school. In 1882, Jones moved to Villisca, Iowa. He taught school and was a farmer. He worked as a bookkeeper and then owned a hardware and farm implement business in Villisca, Iowa. He was also in the banking business. Jones served on the Villisca City Council. From 1904 to 1909, Jones served in the Iowa House of Representatives and was a Republican. He then served in the Iowa State Senate from 1913 to 1917. Jones also served on the Iowa Board of Education. In 1940, Jones wrote a book: Reminiscences of Events in the Life of F. F. Jones. In 1938, Jones retired. He died at his home in Villisca, Iowa.

He was considered a suspect in the Villisca axe murders in 1912, due to his business rivalry with the deceased, although nothing was proven. The case remains unsolved.
