= Nodaway Valley High School =

Public secondary school in Greenfield, Iowa, United States

Location
- 410 NW 2nd Greenfield, IA 50849; United States; 41.311°N 94.465°W

Information
- Type: Public secondary
- Established: 1993
- School district: Nodaway Valley Community School District
- Principal: Gerry Miller
- Teaching staff: 16.49 (FTE)
- Grades: 9-12
- Enrollment: 203 (2023-2024)
- Student to teacher ratio: 12.31
- Campus type: Rural
- Colors: Silver and Purple
- Athletics conference: Pride of Iowa
- Mascot: Wolverines
- Website: www.nodawayvalley.org/nvhs

Nodaway Valley High School is a rural public high school in Greenfield, Iowa, United States. It is part of the Nodaway Valley Community School District.

It serves the towns of Greenfield, Bridgewater, and Fontanelle, and surrounding rural areas.

The school was formed in 1993 from the merger of Bridgewater–Fontanelle High School and Greenfield High School. On July 1, 2000, the school's district, Greenfield Community School District, merged with Bridgewater–Fontanelle to form the Nodaway Valley district.

In 2005, it had 295 students and 26 teachers. 13% were eligible for free lunch, less than the state average of 23%.

Nodaway Valley's mascot of is the wolverine. School colors are silver, purple, and black.

== Athletics ==
The Wolverines compete in the Pride of Iowa Conference in the following sports:

- Football
- Volleyball
- Cross Country
  - Boys' 4-time Class 1A State Champions (2002, 2015, 2016, 2017)
  - Girls' 2009 Class 1A State Champions
- Basketball
  - Boys' 2006 Class 2A State Champions
- Wrestling
- Bowling
- Golf
- Track and Field
- Baseball
- Softball

== See also ==
- List of high schools in Iowa
