= C & M Community School District =

Former school district in Iowa

C & M Community School District was a school district headquartered in Massena, Iowa. The name was a reference to Cumberland and Massena, the two cities it served. It was almost entirely in Cass County with a small portion in Adams County.

Circa 2002 it began a "grade sharing" arrangement with the Anita Community School District, in which the districts sent each other's students to their schools. The Anita district operated the high school while the C&M district operated the middle school; both districts had their own elementary schools. The C&M district had about 201 students in the 2008–2009 school year.

On July 1, 2011, it merged with the Anita district to form the CAM Community School District.
