= New Market Community School District =

Defunct school district in Iowa, United States

New Market Community School District was a school district headquartered in New Market, Iowa, United States.

== History ==
In 1882 the school opened in the M.E. Church, and that year it moved to a school building with four rooms. A five-room school house was built after a 1900 fire destroyed the initial location. The 10th grade was established in 1912. Lohn Liggett gave support to a brick schoolhouse built in the 1921–1922 school year. New Market schools consolidated with several rural schools on November 12, 1958. An elementary school and gymnasium building were constructed in 1961.

The high school division closed in 1989. From that point forward students could choose to attend high school in the Bedford Community School District, the Clarinda Community School District, or the Villisca Community School District.

In October 2006 the school board of the district held a community forum on what future the residents desired for the district. After receiving input the district formed the New Market Community School District Dissolution Commission as it determined most residents wanted the existing district dissolved. An election to determine whether the dissolution would happen was to be held in September 2007.

The district held its final classes on May 23, 2008. On July 1, 2008, the district was dissolved; portions went to the Bedford, Clarinda, Corning, and Villisca school districts.
