= Southwest Valley High School =

Public secondary school in Corning, Iowa, U.S.

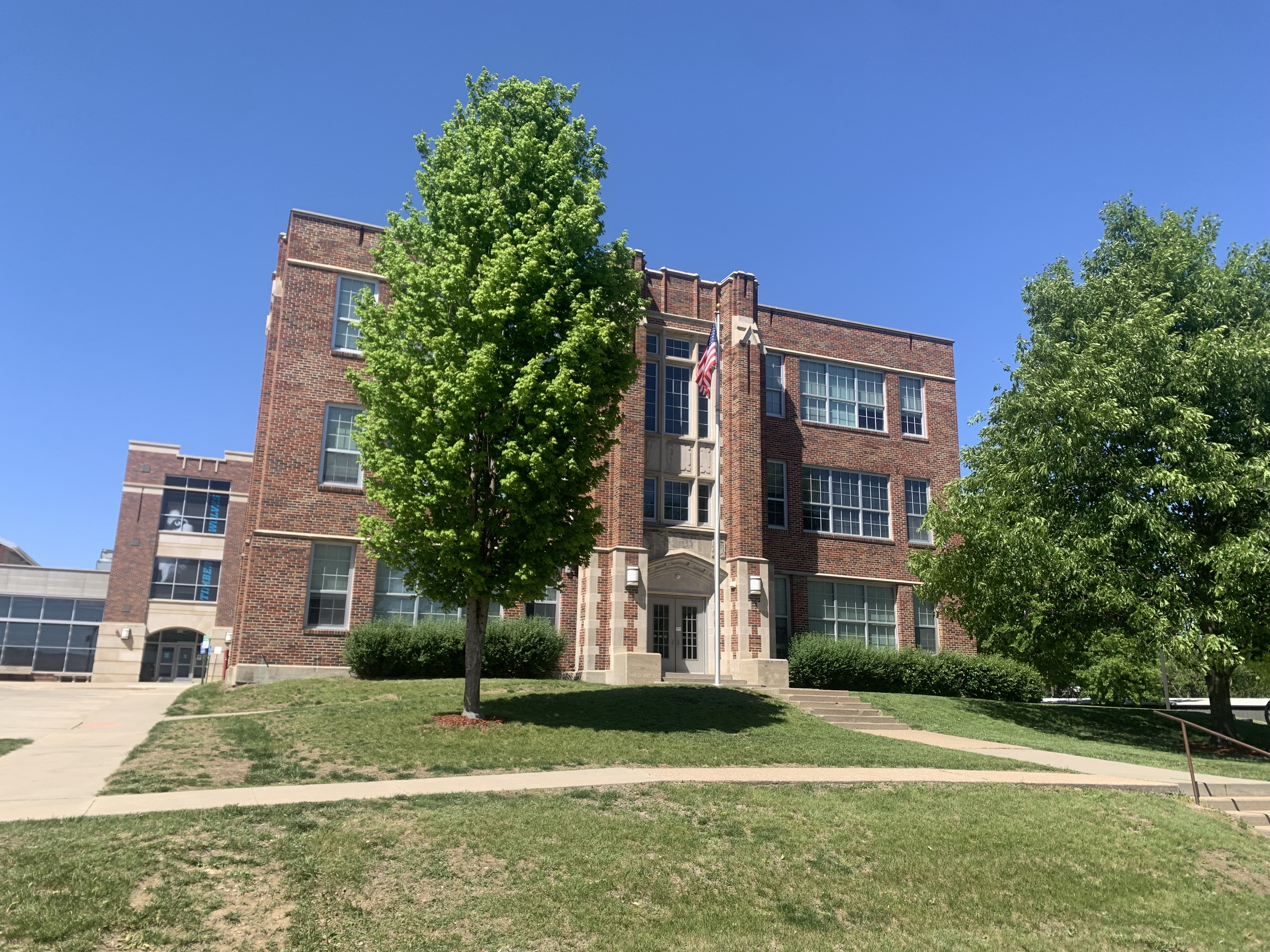

Location
- 904 8th St; Corning, Iowa 50841; United States
- Coordinates: 40.9907°N 94.7400°W

Information
- Type: Public Secondary
- Established: 2012
- School district: Corning Community Schools (partnered with Villisca Community Schools)
- Superintendent: Chris Fenster
- NCES School ID: 190813000404
- Principal: Jennifer Bissell
- Teaching staff: 14.96 (FTE)
- Grades: 9-12
- Enrollment: 193 (2023-2024)
- Student to teacher ratio: 12.90
- Campus type: Rural
- Colors: Black and Teal
- Athletics conference: Pride of Iowa
- Mascot: Timberwolves
- Newspaper: The Timberwolf Times
- Website: www.southwestvalley.org

Southwest Valley High School is a rural, public high school located in Corning, Iowa. The school was renamed after Corning Community Schools and Villisca Community Schools entered into a whole-grade sharing agreement. Under the terms of the agreement, Corning is responsible for the education of grades 9-12 and administration of all high school athletics. Villisca is home to the Southwest Valley Middle School and is responsible for the education of grades 6-8 and administration of all junior high athletics. The new moniker for the combined schools is Southwest Valley Timberwolves.

The Corning district serves Corning and Carbon, while the Villisca district serves Villisca and Nodaway.

== Predecessor schools ==
Corning High School was a public secondary school in Corning, Iowa. The school served more than 150 students in grades 9 through 12 as the only public high school in Adams County and was administered by Corning Community Schools. The school's former mascot and athletic emblem was the Red Raiders.

Villisca High School was a public secondary school in Villisca, Iowa. The school served more than 100 students in grades 9 through 12 and was one of three high schools in Montgomery County, administered by Villisca Community Schools. The school's former mascot and athletic emblem was the Bluejays.

== Athletics ==
The Timberwolves compete in the Pride of Iowa Conference in the following sports:

- Football
- Volleyball
- Cross Country
- Basketball
- Wrestling
- Bowling
- Golf
- Tennis
- Track and Field
- Baseball
- Softball

== See also ==
- List of school districts in Iowa
- List of high schools in Iowa
