= Cumberland, Iowa =

Cumberland
- City
- The city hall building in downtown Cumberland

- Location in the State of Iowa
- Coordinates: 41°16′20″N 94°52′26″W
- Country: US
- State: Iowa
- County: Cass
- Established: 1885

Area
  - Total: 0.62 sq mi (1.60 km^{2})
  - Land: 0.62 sq mi (1.60 km^{2})
  - Water: 0 sq mi (0.00 km^{2})
- Elevation: 1,296 ft (395 m)

Population (2020)
  - Total: 251
  - Density: 405.0/sq mi (156.39/km^{2})
- Time zone: UTC-6 (CST)
  - Summer (DST): UTC-5 (CDT)
- ZIP code: 50843
- Area code: 712
- FIPS code: 19-17760
- GNIS feature ID: 2393694
- Website: http://www.cumberlandiowa.com/

Cumberland is a city in Cass County, Iowa, United States that was founded in 1884. The population was 251 at the time of the 2020 census. Cumberland's sister community is Massena, Iowa.

== Geography ==
According to the United States Census Bureau, the city has a total area of 0.60 square miles (1.55 km^{2}), all land.

== Demographics ==
Historical population
Year	Pop.	±%
1900	591	—
1910	552	−6.6%
1920	561	+1.6%
1930	595	+6.1%
1940	578	−2.9%
1950	493	−14.7%
1960	425	−13.8%
1970	385	−9.4%
1980	351	−8.8%
1990	295	−16.0%
2000	281	−4.7%
2010	262	−6.8%
2020	251	−4.2%
Source:"U.S. Census website". United States Census Bureau. and Iowa Data Center; Source: U.S. Decennial Census

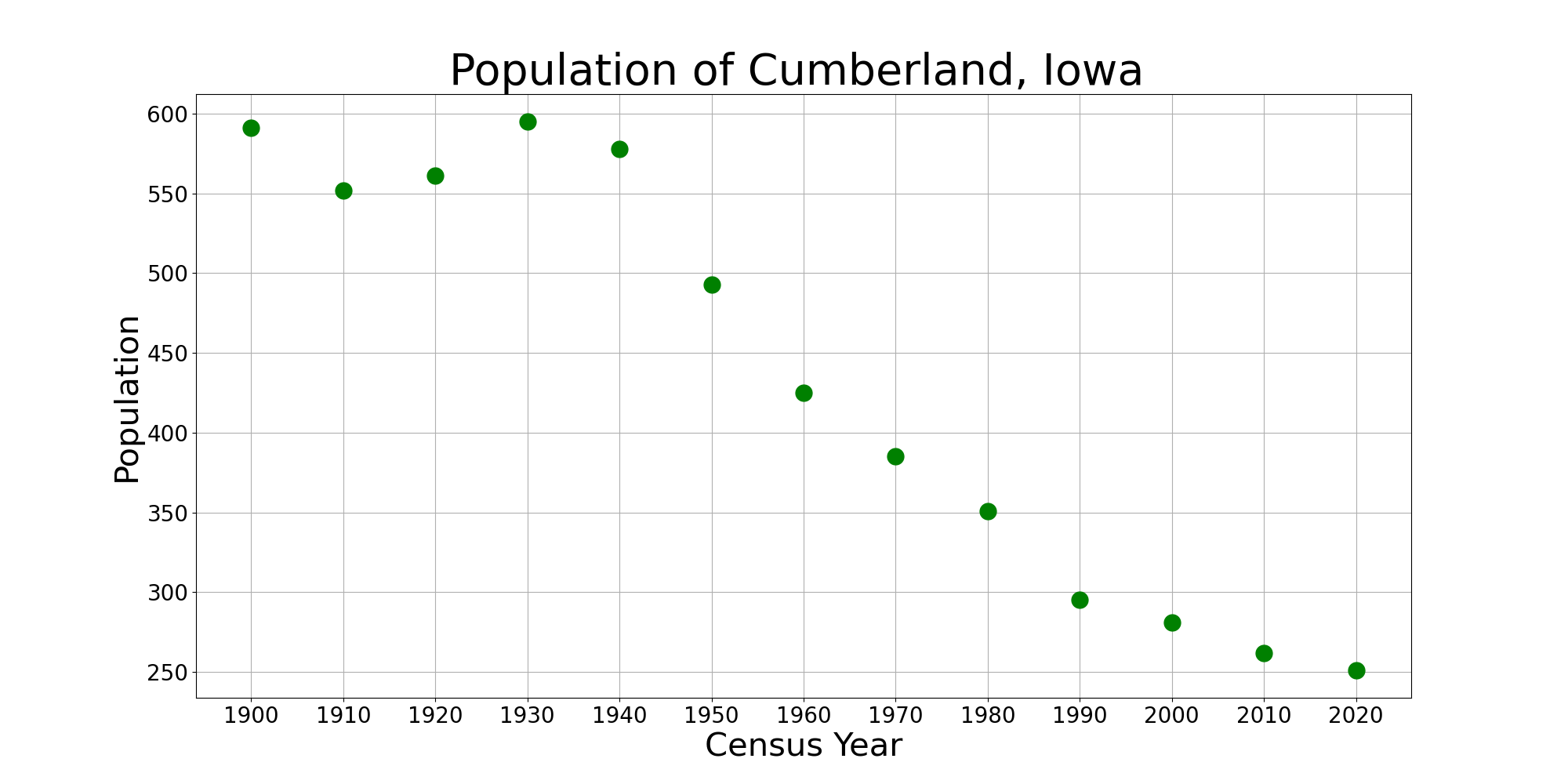
The population of Cumberland, Iowa from US census data

=== 2020 census ===
As of the census of 2020, there were 251 people, 110 households, and 68 families residing in the city. The population density was 405.0 inhabitants per square mile (156.4/km^{2}). There were 122 housing units at an average density of 196.9 per square mile (76.0/km^{2}). The racial makeup of the city was 94.0% White, 0.0% Black or African American, 0.4% Native American, 0.8% Asian, 0.0% Pacific Islander, 0.4% from other races and 4.4% from two or more races. Hispanic or Latino persons of any race comprised 1.6% of the population.

Of the 110 households, 27.3% of which had children under the age of 18 living with them, 39.1% were married couples living together, 7.3% were cohabitating couples, 24.5% had a female householder with no spouse or partner present and 29.1% had a male householder with no spouse or partner present. 38.2% of all households were non-families. 31.8% of all households were made up of individuals, 13.6% had someone living alone who was 65 years old or older.

The median age in the city was 41.5 years. 26.7% of the residents were under the age of 20; 2.4% were between the ages of 20 and 24; 22.7% were from 25 and 44; 25.5% were from 45 and 64; and 22.7% were 65 years of age or older. The gender makeup of the city was 55.0% male and 45.0% female.

=== 2010 census ===
As of the census of 2010, there were 262 people, 116 households, and 66 families living in the city. The population density was 436.7 inhabitants per square mile (168.6/km^{2}). There were 132 housing units at an average density of 220.0 per square mile (84.9/km^{2}). The racial makeup of the city was 98.9% White, 0.4% Native American, 0.4% Pacific Islander, and 0.4% from two or more races. Hispanic or Latino of any race were 0.4% of the population.

There were 116 households, of which 27.6% had children under the age of 18 living with them, 44.0% were married couples living together, 6.9% had a female householder with no husband present, 6.0% had a male householder with no wife present, and 43.1% were non-families. 37.9% of all households were made up of individuals, and 16.3% had someone living alone who was 65 years of age or older. The average household size was 2.26 and the average family size was 2.94.

The median age in the city was 41.6 years. 25.2% of residents were under the age of 18; 6.8% were between the ages of 18 and 24; 21.4% were from 25 to 44; 28.6% were from 45 to 64; and 17.9% were 65 years of age or older. The gender makeup of the city was 50.4% male and 49.6% female.

=== 2000 census ===
As of the census of 2000, there were 281 people, 128 households, and 82 families living in the city. The population density was 466.9 inhabitants per square mile (180.3/km^{2}). There were 144 housing units at an average density of 239.3 per square mile (92.4/km^{2}). The racial makeup of the city was 99.29% White, 0.36% Native American, and 0.36% from two or more races.

There were 128 households, out of which 25.0% had children under the age of 18 living with them, 59.4% were married couples living together, 3.9% had a female householder with no husband present, and 35.2% were non-families. 34.4% of all households were made up of individuals, and 17.2% had someone living alone who was 65 years of age or older. The average household size was 2.20 and the average family size was 2.81.

In the city, the population was spread out, with 21.0% under the age of 18, 4.6% from 18 to 24, 25.6% from 25 to 44, 24.9% from 45 to 64, and 23.8% who were 65 years of age or older. The median age was 44 years. For every 100 females, there were 100.7 males. For every 100 females age 18 and over, there were 100.0 males.

The median income for a household in the city was $28,750, and the median income for a family was $39,167. Males had a median income of $26,786 versus $15,500 for females. The per capita income for the city was $15,662. About 6.1% of families and 8.3% of the population were below the poverty line, including 10.4% of those under the age of eighteen and 6.3% of those 65 or over.

== Education ==
Cumberland is within the CAM Community School District.

It was a part of the C & M Community School District, until July 1, 2011, when it merged into CAM.
