= Villisca Community School District =

School district in Iowa, United States

Coordinates: 40.929783°N 94.975228°W

Location
- Villisca, Iowa Adams, Montgomery, Page, and Taylor counties United States
- Coordinates: 40.929783, -94.975228

District information
- Type: Local school district
- Grades: K-12
- Superintendent: Chris Fenster
- Schools: 2
- Budget: $5,625,000 (2020-21)
- NCES District ID: 1929280

Students and staff
- Students: 279 (2022-23)
- Teachers: 23.65 FTE
- Staff: 31.41 FTE
- Student–teacher ratio: 11.80
- Athletic conference: Pride of Iowa
- District mascot: Timberwolves
- Colors: Black and Teal

Other information
- Website: www.southwestvalley.org

Villisca Community School District is a school district headquartered in Villisca, Iowa. Along with the Corning Community School District, it has the branding "Southwest Valley Schools". The district is in parts of Adams, Montgomery, Page, and Taylor counties, and it serves Villisca and Nodaway.

It operates Emerson Elementary School and Southwest Valley Middle School in Villisca. The district sends its students to Southwest Valley High School, operated by Corning CSD. The two districts also share superintendents. As of 2016 the shared superintendent is Willie Stone.

== History ==
In 1913 the original Villisca school building was built, and in 1926 it received an addition. A new Villisca school building was to be built in 2000.

After some time as superintendent of Hull Public School, Leslie Walpole assumed the same role at Villisca Community School District by 1932.

On July 1, 2008, the district absorbed portions of the former New Market Community School District.

By 2011 the process of establishing a grade-sharing agreement with Corning was under way. A feasibility study conducted that year by Dr. Robert Decker of the University of Northern Iowa recommended doing the grade-sharing with Corning instead of with the Stanton Community School District.
