= Bridgewater, Iowa =

- City
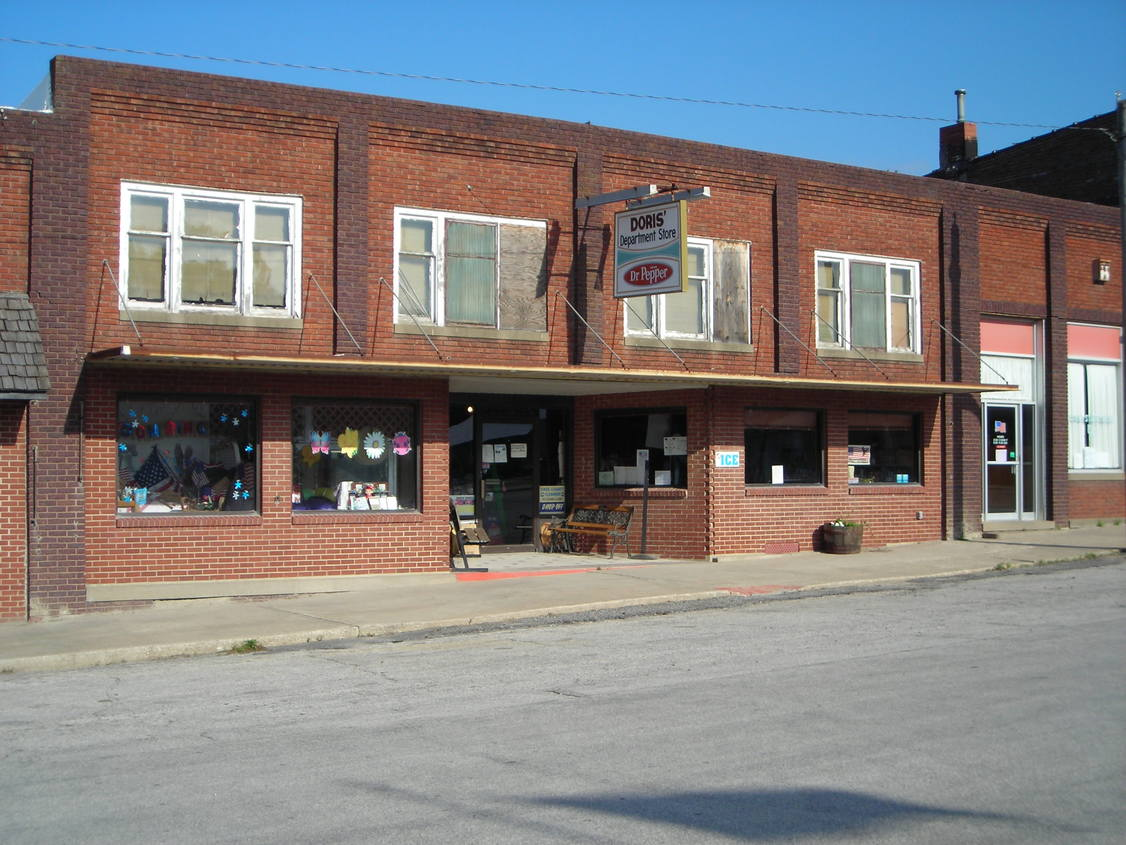
- Part of Main Street

- Coordinates: 41°14′50″N 94°40′08″W
- Country: United States
- State: Iowa
- County: Adair
- Township: Jackson
- Founded: 1885
- Incorporated: April 1, 1905

Area
  - Total: 0.29 sq mi (0.75 km^{2})
  - Land: 0.29 sq mi (0.75 km^{2})
  - Water: 0 sq mi (0.00 km^{2})
- Elevation: 1,250 ft (380 m)

Population (2020)
  - Total: 148
  - Density: 513.3/sq mi (198.18/km^{2})
- Time zone: UTC-6 (CST)
  - Summer (DST): UTC-5 (CDT)
- ZIP code: 50837
- Area code: 641
- FIPS code: 19-08425
- GNIS feature ID: 2393418

Bridgewater is a city in Jackson Township, Adair County, Iowa, United States. The population was 148 at the time of the 2020 census. Bridgewater was founded in 1885.

== History ==
Bridgewater got its start in 1885 when the Chicago, Burlington and Quincy Railroad was extended to that point. A post office called Bridgewater has been in operation since 1885. Bridgewater was officially incorporated as a city on April 1, 1905.

== Geography ==
Mormon Trail Lake and Park are located outside of town.

According to the United States Census Bureau, the city has a total area of 0.29 square miles (0.75 km^{2}), all land.

== Demographics ==
Historical population
Census	Pop.	Note	%±
1910	365		—
1920	343		−6.0%
1930	327		−4.7%
1940	302		−7.6%
1950	296		−2.0%
1960	225		−24.0%
1970	188		−16.4%
1980	233		23.9%
1990	209		−10.3%
2000	178		−14.8%
2010	182		2.2%
2020	148		−18.7%
U.S. Decennial Census

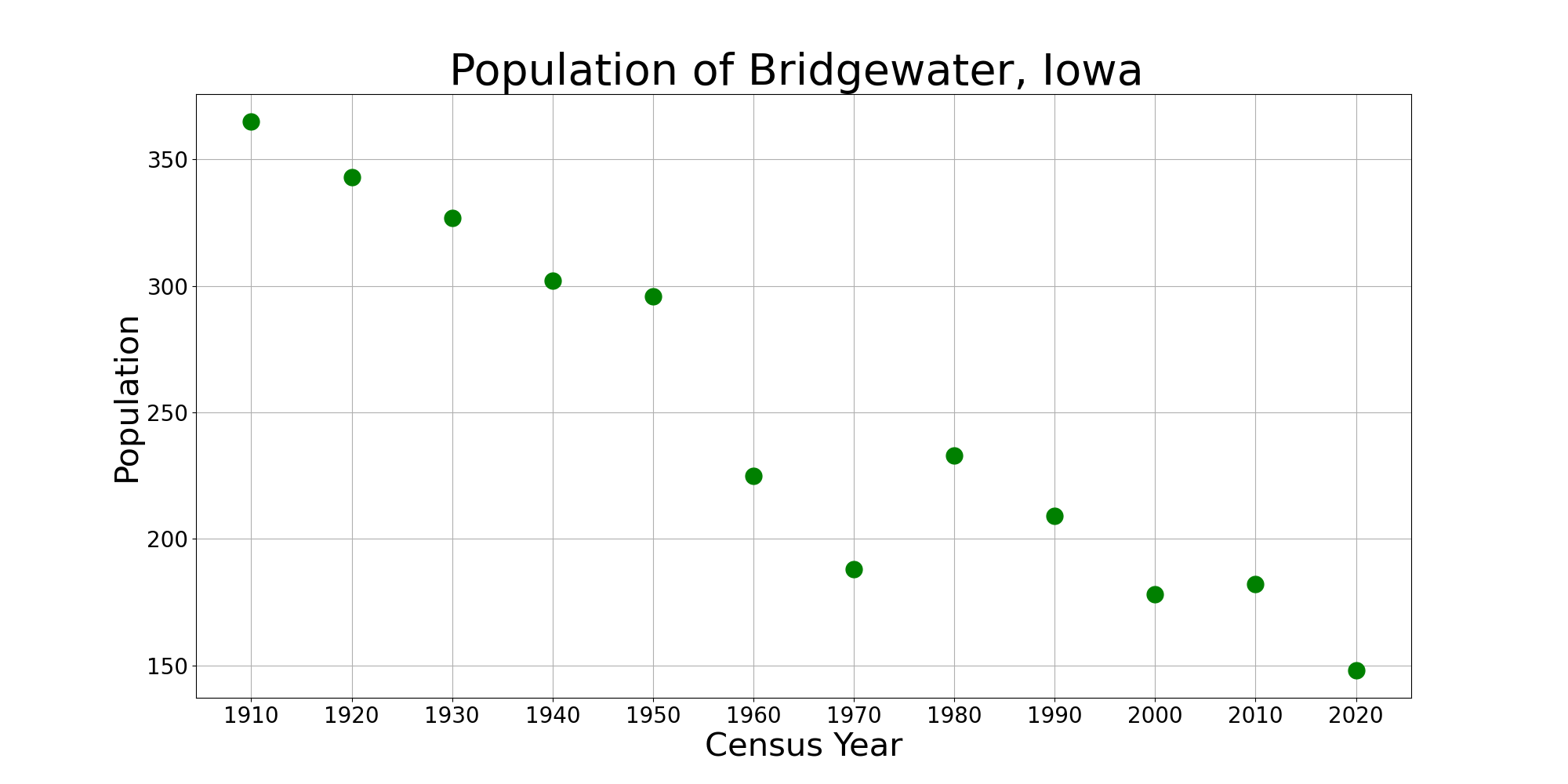
The population of Bridgewater, Iowa from US census data

=== 2020 census ===
As of the census of 2020, there were 148 people, 64 households, and 32 families residing in the city. The population density was 513.3 inhabitants per square mile (198.2/km^{2}). There were 89 housing units at an average density of 308.7 per square mile (119.2/km^{2}). The racial makeup of the city was 93.9% White, 0.0% Black or African American, 0.0% Native American, 0.0% Asian, 0.0% Pacific Islander, 0.7% from other races and 5.4% from two or more races. Hispanic or Latino persons of any race comprised 4.1% of the population.

Of the 64 households, 20.3% of which had children under the age of 18 living with them, 39.1% were married couples living together, 6.2% were cohabitating couples, 23.4% had a female householder with no spouse or partner present and 31.2% had a male householder with no spouse or partner present. 50.0% of all households were non-families. 42.2% of all households were made up of individuals, 20.3% had someone living alone who was 65 years old or older.

The median age in the city was 46.7 years. 23.0% of the residents were under the age of 20; 6.8% were between the ages of 20 and 24; 16.9% were from 25 and 44; 27.0% were from 45 and 64; and 26.4% were 65 years of age or older. The gender makeup of the city was 52.7% male and 47.3% female.

=== 2010 census ===
As of the census of 2010, there were 182 people, 89 households, and 48 families living in the city. The population density was 627.6 inhabitants per square mile (242.3/km^{2}). There were 100 housing units at an average density of 344.8 per square mile (133.1/km^{2}). The racial makeup of the city was 95.1% White, 0.5% Asian, 0.5% from other races, and 3.8% from two or more races. Hispanic or Latino of any race were 0.5% of the population.

There were 89 households, of which 20.2% had children under the age of 18 living with them, 43.8% were married couples living together, 6.7% had a female householder with no husband present, 3.4% had a male householder with no wife present, and 46.1% were non-families. 43.8% of all households were made up of individuals, and 28.1% had someone living alone who was 65 years of age or older. The average household size was 2.04 and the average family size was 2.83.

The median age in the city was 47.3 years. 21.4% of residents were under the age of 18; 4.8% were between the ages of 18 and 24; 20.3% were from 25 to 44; 24.6% were from 45 to 64; and 28.6% were 65 years of age or older. The gender makeup of the city was 53.3% male and 46.7% female.

=== 2000 census ===
As of the census of 2000, there were 178 people, 87 households, and 56 families living in the city. The population density was 620.7 inhabitants per square mile (239.7/km^{2}). There were 105 housing units at an average density of 366.1 per square mile (141.4/km^{2}). The racial makeup of the city was 99.44% White. Hispanic or Latino of any race were 0.56% of the population.

There were 87 households, out of which 17.2% had children under the age of 18 living with them, 52.9% were married couples living together, 4.6% had a female householder with no husband present, and 35.6% were non-families. 32.2% of all households were made up of individuals, and 17.2% had someone living alone who was 65 years of age or older. The average household size was 2.05 and the average family size was 2.50.

Age spread: 17.4% under the age of 18, 4.5% from 18 to 24, 20.2% from 25 to 44, 24.7% from 45 to 64, and 33.1% who were 65 years of age or older. The median age was 49 years. For every 100 females, there were 93.5 males. For every 100 females age 18 and over, there were 93.4 males.

The median income for a household in the city was $30,536, and the median income for a family was $31,625. Males had a median income of $27,188 versus $20,417 for females. The per capita income for the city was $18,780. None of the families and 7.0% of the population were living below the poverty line, including no under eighteens and 6.6% of those over 64.

== Education ==
Nodaway Valley Community School District serves the community. It was formed on July 1, 2000, by the consolidation of the districts of Greenfield and Bridgewater–Fontanelle. Nodaway Valley High School is the joint high school.

== Notable person ==
- Joy Corning, Lieutenant Governor of Iowa, was born in Bridgewater.
