= Viking Lake State Park =

State park in Montgomery County, Iowa, United States

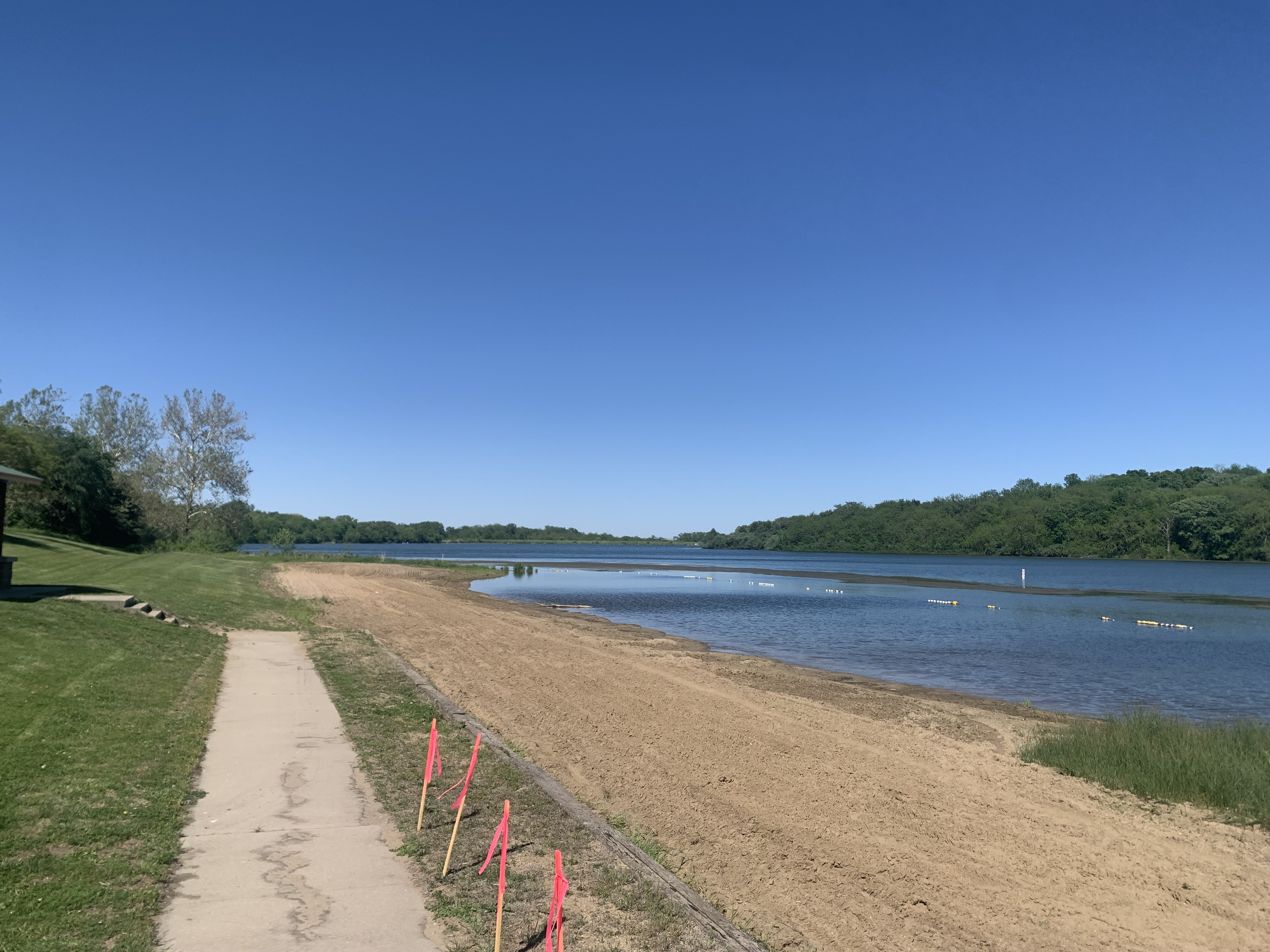
- Viking Lake beach

- Location within Iowa Location within the United States
- Location: Montgomery County, Iowa, United States
- Nearest city: Stanton, Iowa
- Coordinates: 40°58′26″N 95°02′07″W
- Area: 1,000 acres (400 ha)
- Elevation: 1,119 ft (341 m)
- Administrator: Iowa Department of Natural Resources
- Website: Official website

Viking Lake State Park is a 1,000-acre (400 ha) state park in Montgomery County, Iowa, United States, located near the city of Stanton. The park is centered on the eponymous Viking Lake, which covers 136 acres (55 ha).

The park's amenities include electric and non-electric campsites, six jetties for fishing, and a swimming beach. A restaurant and a boat rental facility can be found near the beach. The park also includes a 6-mile (9.7 km) hiking trail around the lake and a shorter interpretive trail.

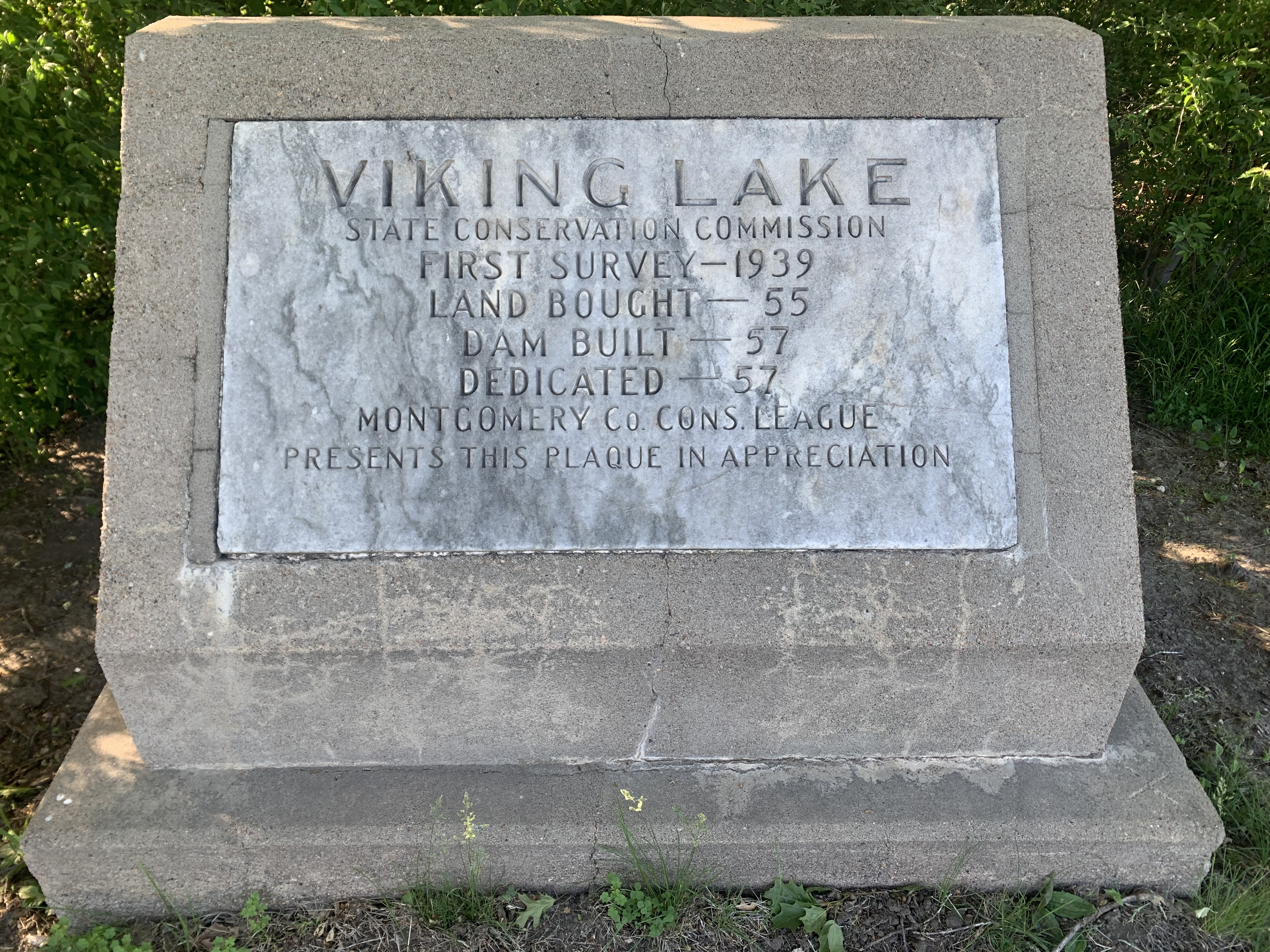
Viking Lake plaque in Viking Lake State Park

Much of the park is undeveloped, and a variety of wild plants can be found there. Animals that live within the park include white-tailed deer, beavers, turkeys, and ducks. The lake is a popular fishing site and is home to bluegill, largemouth bass, and redear sunfish.
