= Creston News Advertiser =

Weekly newspaper in Creston, Iowa

- Relevant Information, Marketing Solutions, Community Advocates.
- Type: Daily newspaper
- Owner: Louie Mullen
- Publisher: Creston Publishing Company
- Editor: Cheyenne Roche
- General manager: Craig Mittag
- Founded: 1928; 98 years ago
- Headquarters: Creston, IA
- Circulation: 2,209
- Website: crestonnews.com

The Creston News Advertiser is an online newspaper in Creston, Iowa, United States, and is printed three days a week.

== History ==
The newspaper was started by Frank B. Thayer and Joel R. Hill, a Kansas City banker, in 1928 as a result of the merger of two newspapers, the Creston Evening News and the Creston Daily Advertiser. Creston Evening News was founded as a weekly in 1879 and began daily circulation in 1881. The Creston News Advertiser was purchased by Shaw Media in 1946. The paper ever since has managed by a subsidiary called Creston Publishing Company. The company has also published the Fontanelle Observer and the Adair County Free Press since 2017.
