= Villisca, Iowa =

- City
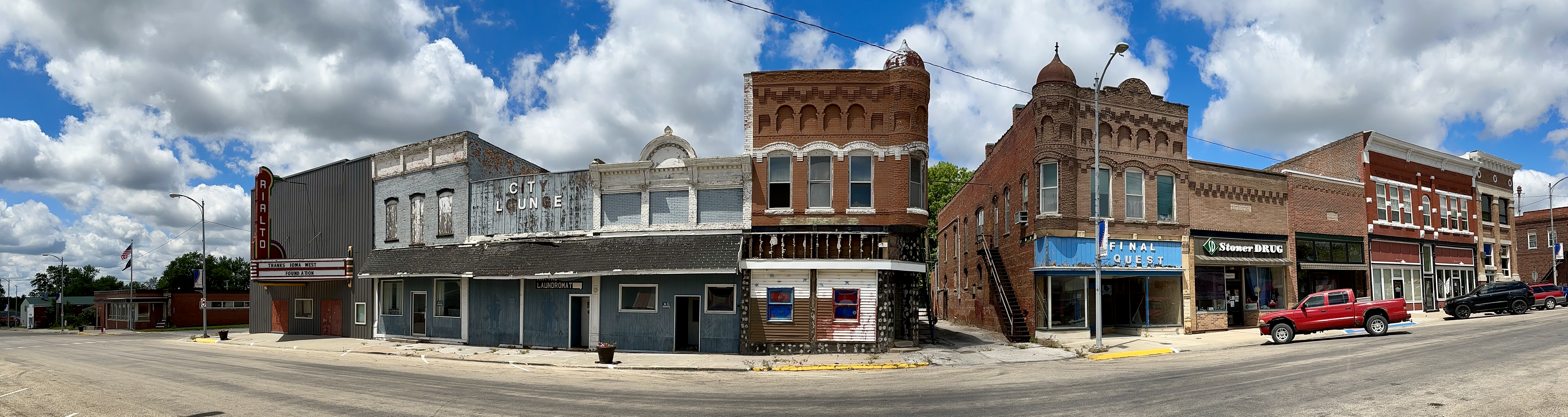
- Downtown Villisca (1 June 2024)
- Motto: "There's Only One…"
- Location of Villisca, Iowa
- Coordinates: 40°55′45″N 94°58′52″W
- Country: United States
- State: Iowa
- County: Montgomery
- Township: East
- Founded: 1858
- Incorporated: September 3, 1869

Area
  - Total: 1.78 sq mi (4.62 km^{2})
  - Land: 1.78 sq mi (4.62 km^{2})
  - Water: 0 sq mi (0.00 km^{2})
- Elevation: 1,086 ft (331 m)

Population (2020)
  - Total: 1,132
  - Density: 634.2/sq mi (244.88/km^{2})
- Time zone: UTC-6 (Central (CST))
  - Summer (DST): UTC-5 (CDT)
- ZIP code: 50864
- Area code: 712
- FIPS code: 19-80985
- GNIS feature ID: 2397142
- Website: www.cityofvillisca.com

Villisca is a city in East Township, Montgomery County, Iowa, United States. The population was 1,132 at the time of the 2020 census. It is most notable for the unsolved axe murders that took place in the town on June 9, 1912.

== History ==
The settlement was founded under the name "The Forks". Villisca was platted in 1858 by pioneer D. N. Smith.

Villisca was incorporated as a town on September 3, 1869.

== Geography ==
According to the United States Census Bureau, the city has a total area of 1.90 square miles (4.92 km^{2}), all land.

== Demographics ==
Historical populations
Year	Pop.	±%
1870	457	—
1880	1,299	+184.2%
1890	1,744	+34.3%
1900	2,211	+26.8%
1910	2,039	−7.8%
1920	2,111	+3.5%
1930	2,032	−3.7%
1940	2,011	−1.0%
1950	1,838	−8.6%
1960	1,690	−8.1%
1970	1,402	−17.0%
1980	1,434	+2.3%
1990	1,332	−7.1%
2000	1,344	+0.9%
2010	1,252	−6.8%
2020	1,132	−9.6%
Source:"U.S. Census website". United States Census Bureau. and Iowa Data Center; Source: U.S. Decennial Census

=== 2020 census ===
As of the 2020 census, Villisca had a population of 1,132. The population density was 634.2 inhabitants per square mile (244.9/km^{2}).

The median age in the city was 44.4 years. 21.9% of residents were under the age of 18, and 24.3% were 65 years of age or older. 24.5% of residents were under the age of 20; 4.1% were between the ages of 20 and 24; 22.3% were from 25 to 44; and 24.9% were from 45 to 64. The gender makeup of the city was 47.1% male and 52.9% female. For every 100 females there were 89.0 males, and for every 100 females age 18 and over there were 88.5 males age 18 and over.

There were 487 households and 274 families in the city, of which 27.5% of households had children under the age of 18 living with them. Of all households, 38.8% were married-couple households, 7.2% were cohabitating-couple households, 20.5% were households with a male householder and no spouse or partner present, and 33.5% were households with a female householder and no spouse or partner present. 43.7% of all households were non-families. About 40.0% of all households were made up of individuals, and 21.4% had someone living alone who was 65 years of age or older.

There were 558 housing units, of which 12.7% were vacant. The homeowner vacancy rate was 2.1% and the rental vacancy rate was 12.2%.

0.0% of residents lived in urban areas, while 100.0% lived in rural areas.

Racial composition as of the 2020 census
Race	Number	Percent
White	1,083	95.7%
Black or African American	3	0.3%
American Indian and Alaska Native	3	0.3%
Asian	0	0.0%
Native Hawaiian and Other Pacific Islander	0	0.0%
Some other race	4	0.4%
Two or more races	39	3.4%
Hispanic or Latino (of any race)	18	1.6%

=== 2010 census ===
As of the census of 2010, there were 1,252 people, 525 households, and 331 families living in the city. The population density was 658.9 inhabitants per square mile (254.4/km^{2}). There were 614 housing units at an average density of 323.2 per square mile (124.8/km^{2}). The racial makeup of the city was 97.4% White, 0.2% African American, 0.9% Native American, 0.2% Asian, 0.2% Pacific Islander, 0.6% from other races, and 0.5% from two or more races. Hispanic or Latino of any race were 3.0% of the population.

There were 525 households, of which 30.5% had children under the age of 18 living with them, 48.6% were married couples living together, 10.3% had a female householder with no husband present, 4.2% had a male householder with no wife present, and 37.0% were non-families. 31.6% of all households were made up of individuals, and 16.9% had someone living alone who was 65 years of age or older. The average household size was 2.32 and the average family size was 2.88.

The median age in the city was 42.6 years. 23.2% of residents were under the age of 18; 6.7% were between the ages of 18 and 24; 22.8% were from 25 to 44; 25.3% were from 45 to 64; and 22% were 65 years of age or older. The gender makeup of the city was 47.5% male and 52.5% female.

=== 2000 census ===
As of the census of 2000, there were 1,344 people, 576 households, and 347 families living in the city. The population density was 703.9 inhabitants per square mile (271.8/km^{2}). There were 636 housing units at an average density of 333.1 per square mile (128.6/km^{2}). The racial makeup of the city was 98.81% White, 0.07% African American, 0.30% Native American, 0.07% Asian, 0.37% from other races, and 0.37% from two or more races. Hispanic or Latino of any race were 0.37% of the population.

There were 576 households, out of which 26.7% had children under the age of 18 living with them, 46.2% were married couples living together, 10.2% had a female householder with no husband present, and 39.6% were non-families. 34.9% of all households were made up of individuals, and 19.1% had someone living alone who was 65 years of age or older. The average household size was 2.23 and the average family size was 2.87.

In the city, the population was spread out, with 24.0% under the age of 18, 7.1% from 18 to 24, 22.8% from 25 to 44, 21.2% from 45 to 64, and 24.9% who were 65 years of age or older. The median age was 42 years. For every 100 females, there were 84.1 males. For every 100 females age 18 and over, there were 79.1 males.

The median income for a household in the city was $26,694, and the median income for a family was $34,345. Males had a median income of $28,500 versus $20,292 for females. The per capita income for the city was $14,067. About 9.3% of families and 12.9% of the population were below the poverty line, including 12.8% of those under age 18 and 9.2% of those age 65 or over.

== Villisca axe murders ==
On the night of June 9, 1912, the Moore family and two young guests were brutally murdered with an axe, and it was the next morning that they were found in their home by a neighbor and Ross Moore, the brother of Josiah Moore.

Josiah B. Moore and Sarah Montgomery had been married on December 6, 1899. They had four children: Herman, Katherine, Boyd, and Paul. Joe was a prominent and well-liked businessman. By 1912, the Moore Implement Company (a John Deere Company franchise) was a solid competitor with other Villisca area hardware stores, including the Jones Store owned by his former employer, F.F. Jones. Sarah was active in the Presbyterian church and assisted with Children's Day exercises. On the morning of June 10, 1912, Joe (43) and Sara (39), their four children, and two visiting children (Lena and Ina Stillinger), were found bludgeoned to death with the Moores' own axe. Their unsolved murders began a chain of events that split the borough of Villisca, and changed the course of the town's history and the lives of its inhabitants.

== Education ==
It is within the Villisca Community School District. Residents are zoned to Southwest Valley High School, operated by the Corning Community School District, and shared with the Villisca district as part of a grade-sharing agreement.

== Notable people ==
- Frank Fernando Jones – American politician and businessman (1855–1941)
- Randy Weaver -- Participant in the Ruby Ridge standoff
