= Greenfield Community School District =

Defunct school district in Iowa, United States

Greenfield Community School District was a school district headquartered in Greenfield, Iowa, United States.

It entered a grade-sharing agreement with the Bridgewater–Fontanelle Community School District. Bridgewater–Fontanelle hosted the joint middle school and Greenfield hosted the joint high school. The latter, Nodaway Valley High School, opened in 1993. Circa 1998 the two districts had a combined total of 77 teachers and 920 students.

On September 14, 1999, residents of the Greenfield and Bridgewater–Fontanelle districts voted to consolidate them into a new district. On July 1, 2000, it merged with Bridgewater–Fontanelle to form the Nodaway Valley Community School District.
