= Corning Community School District =

School district in Iowa, United States

Coordinates: 40.990335°N 94.740133°W

Location
- Corning, Iowa Adams and Taylor counties United States
- Coordinates: 40.990335, -94.740133

District information
- Type: Local school district
- Grades: K-12
- Superintendent: Chris Fenster
- Schools: 2
- Budget: $9,844,000 (2020-21)
- NCES District ID: 1908130

Students and staff
- Students: 420 (2022-23)
- Teachers: 36.71 FTE
- Staff: 39.48 FTE
- Student–teacher ratio: 11.44
- Athletic conference: Pride of Iowa
- District mascot: Timberwolves
- Colors: Black and Teal

Other information
- Website: www.southwestvalley.org

Corning Community School District is a school district headquartered in Corning, Iowa. Along with the Villisca Community School District, it has the branding "Southwest Valley Schools".

The district is in parts of Adams and Taylor counties, and serves Corning and Carbon.

It operates Corning Elementary School and Southwest Valley High School in Corning. The district sends its students to Southwest Valley Middle School, operated by Villisca SD. The two districts also share superintendents.

== History ==
The district previously operated Corning High School.

On July 1, 2008, the district absorbed portions of the former New Market Community School District.

By 2011, the process of establishing a grade-sharing agreement with Villisca was under way. A feasibility study conducted that year by Dr. Robert Decker of the University of Northern Iowa recommended doing the grade-sharing between Corning and Villisca.
