= Arbor Hill, Iowa =

- Unincorporated community
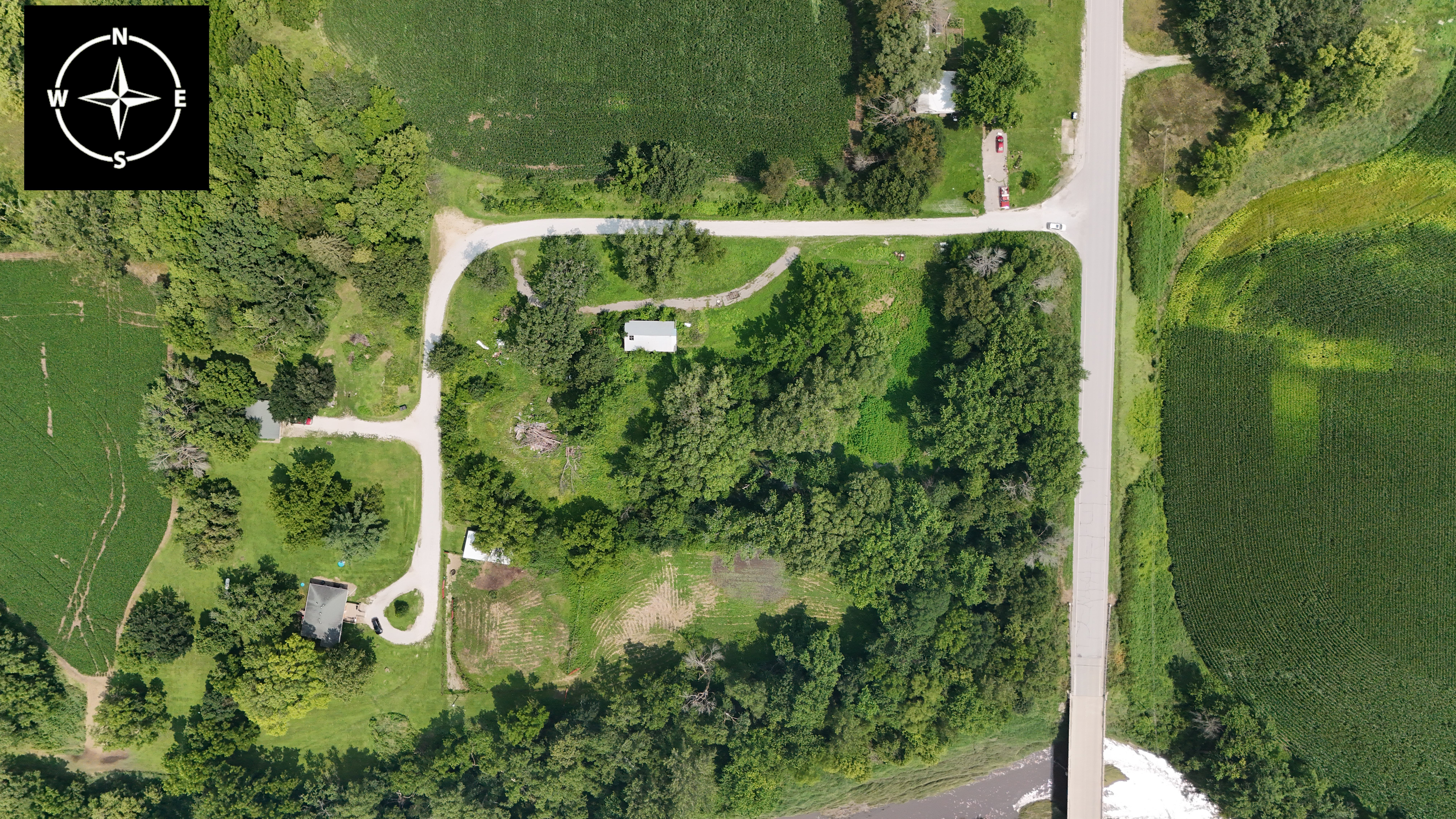
- An aerial view of Arbor Hill on July 13, 2025

- Location within Iowa Location within the United States
- Country: United States
- State: Iowa
- County: Adair
- Township: Harrison
- Elevation: 1,129 ft (344 m)
- Time zone: UTC-6 (Central (CST))
  - Summer (DST): UTC-5 (CDT)
- Area code: 641

Arbor Hill (or Arborhill) is an unincorporated community or ghost town in Harrison Township, Adair County, Iowa, United States.

== Geography ==
It is located on County Road P28, south of Stuart, at 41.366543N, -94.317809W.

== History ==
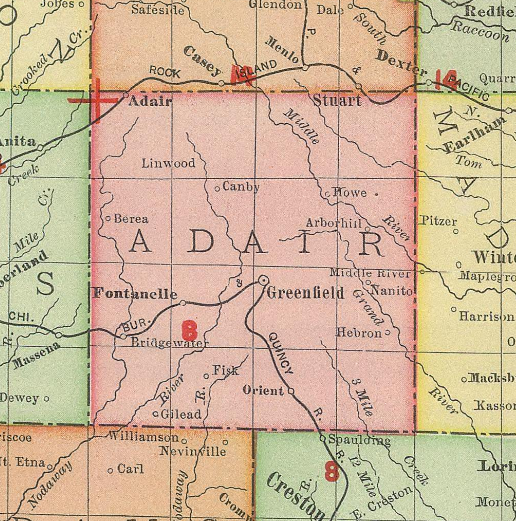
Adair County, showing the location of Arbor Hill in Iowa in 1903.

A post office was established at Arbor Hill in 1857, the name was changed to Arborhill in 1895, and the post office closed in 1907.

Arbor Hill's population was 58 in 1902. The community was once home to the Arbor Hill Co-Operative Creamery Company, a blacksmith shop, and a general store; the Port Union Mill dam was located one half mile west of Arbor Hill, on the Middle River. The community (at that time known as Arborhill) was the site of the Seventh Annual Old Settlers and Old Soldiers Reunion, held on August 12, 13, and 14, 1908.

The Methodist church in Greenfield, constructed in 1877, was built from lumber cut near Arbor Hill.

Arborhill's population was 68 in 1924. The 1930 plat book of Adair County shows Arbor Hill platted in the southeast quadrant of Section 20 of Harrison Township, with the community covering one quarter square mile.

Arbor Hill's population was 12 in 1940.

In 2018, the Arbor Hill Wind Farm project began, with the MidAmerican Energy Company building enough wind turbines in Arbor Hill and nearby Orient to power 230,000 homes.

== See also ==
- Berea, Iowa
