= Arbor Hill =

Arbor Hill may refer to the following places in the United States:

- Arbor Hill, Iowa in Adair County
- Arbor Hill, Albany, New York
