= Fisk, Iowa =

- Unincorporated community
- Location within Iowa
- Coordinates: 41°12′04″N 94°31′41″W
- Country: United States
- State: Iowa
- County: Adair
- Elevation: 1,309 ft (399 m)
- Time zone: UTC-6 (Central (CST))
  - Summer (DST): UTC-5 (CDT)
- Area code: 641
- GNIS feature ID: 464542

Fisk is an unincorporated community or ghost town in Adair County, Iowa, United States.

== History ==
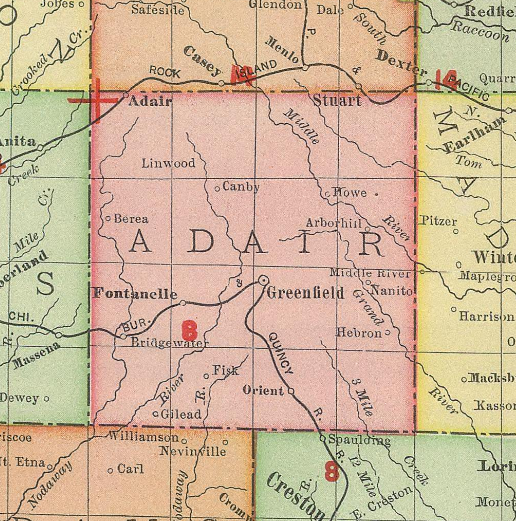
Fisk was located in southwestern Adair County.

Fisk was established near the center of Richland Township.

The first post office in Fisk was established in 1870.

By 1901, Fisk was home to a creamery (the Blue Grass Creamery), a school, and the Fisk Post Office. However, with the introduction of Rural Free Delivery, the Fisk Post Office closed. In 1918, Fisk was described thus: "In Richland township, Adair county. 10 miles sw of Greenfield, the judicial seat, and 6 w of Orient, the nearest railroad station and banking point, whence mail is supplied by rural delivery." The directory went on to list two general stores: those of A.B. Creighton, and J.J. Perkins.

In 1902, Fisk's population was 37, and in 1924, the population was reported as 28. The population was 37 in 1940.

A school and church were still located in Fisk in 1951.
