= Stuart station =

Stuart station may refer to:

- Stuart station (Brightline), Stuart, Florida, United States
- Stuart station (Iowa), Stuart, Iowa, United States

== See also ==
- Stuart Town railway station, Stuart Town, Australia
- J.M. Stuart Station, Aberdeen, Ohio, United States
- Stuart Creek Station, Australia
