= Orient Township =

Orient Township may refer to:

- Orient Township, Adair County, Iowa
- Orient Township, Michigan
- Orient Township, Faulk County, South Dakota, in Faulk County, South Dakota
