= Adair County, Iowa =

County in Iowa, United States

- County
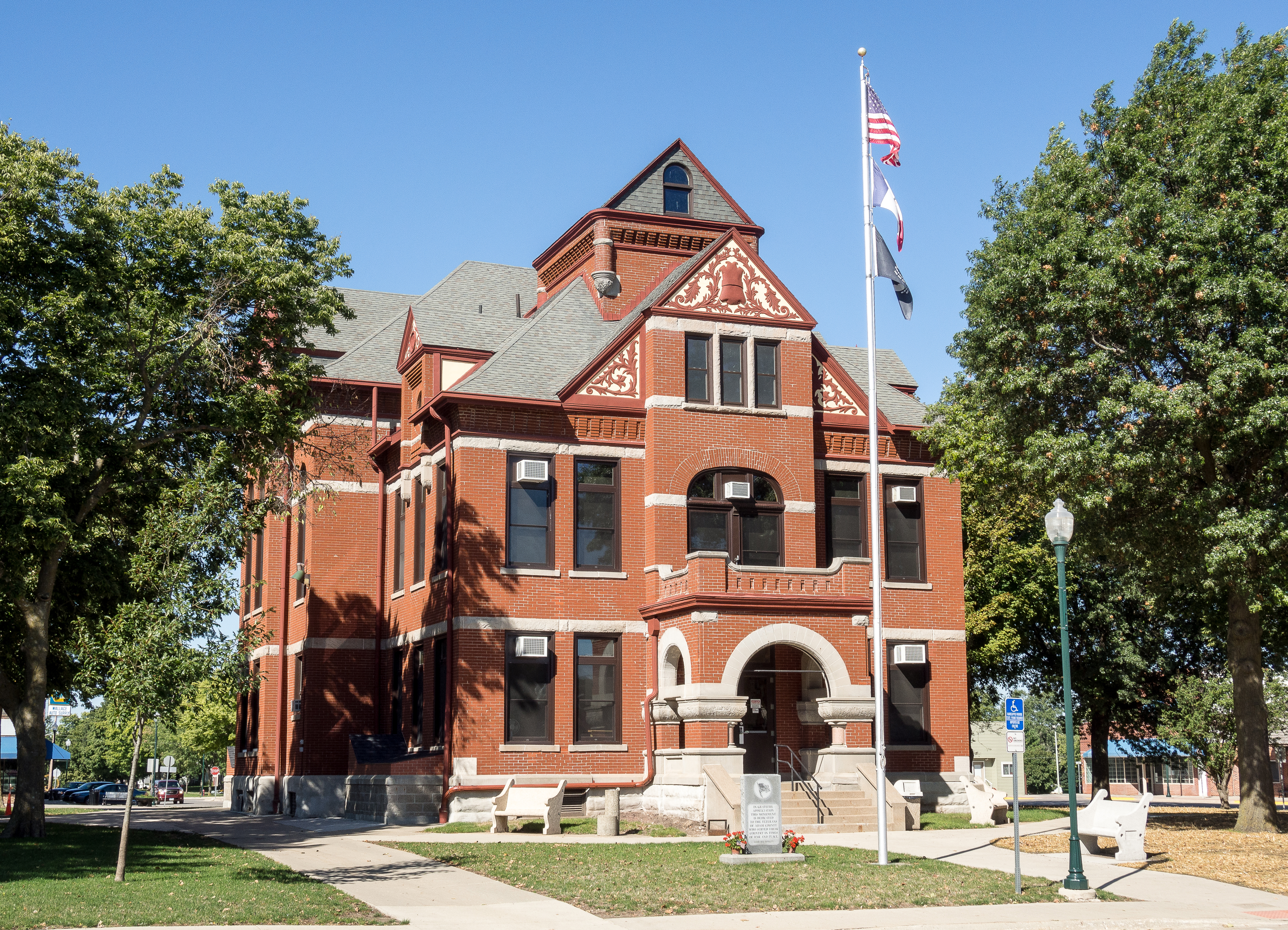
- Adair County Courthouse

- Seal

- Location within the U.S. state of Iowa
- Coordinates: 41°19′50″N 94°28′16″W
- Country: United States
- State: Iowa
- Founded: 1851
- Named for: John Adair
- Seat: Greenfield
- Largest city: Greenfield

Government
  - State Senator: Amy Sinclair
  - State Representative: Ray Sorensen

Area
  - Total: 570 sq mi (1,500 km^{2})
  - Land: 569 sq mi (1,470 km^{2})
  - Water: 1.0 sq mi (2.6 km^{2}) 0.2%

Population (2020)
  - Total: 7,496
  - Estimate (2025): 7,403 ▼
  - Density: 13.2/sq mi (5.09/km^{2})
- Time zone: UTC−6 (Central)
  - Summer (DST): UTC−5 (CDT)
- Congressional district: 3rd
- Website: adaircounty.iowa.gov
- Iowa county number 01

Adair County is a county in the U.S. state of Iowa. As of the 2020 census, the population was 7,496. Its county seat is Greenfield.

== History ==
Adair County was formed in 1851 from sections of Pottawattamie County. It was named for John Adair, a general in the War of 1812, and the eighth Governor of Kentucky.

== Geography ==
According to the U.S. Census Bureau, the county has a total area of 570 square miles (1,500 km^{2}), of which 569 square miles (1,470 km^{2}) is land and 1.0 square mile (2.6 km^{2}) (0.2%) is water.

=== Major highways ===
- Interstate 80
- U.S. Highway 6
- Iowa Highway 25
- Iowa Highway 92

=== Adjacent counties ===
- Guthrie County (north)
- Madison County (east)
- Union County (southeast)
- Adams County (southwest)
- Cass County (west)

== Demographics ==
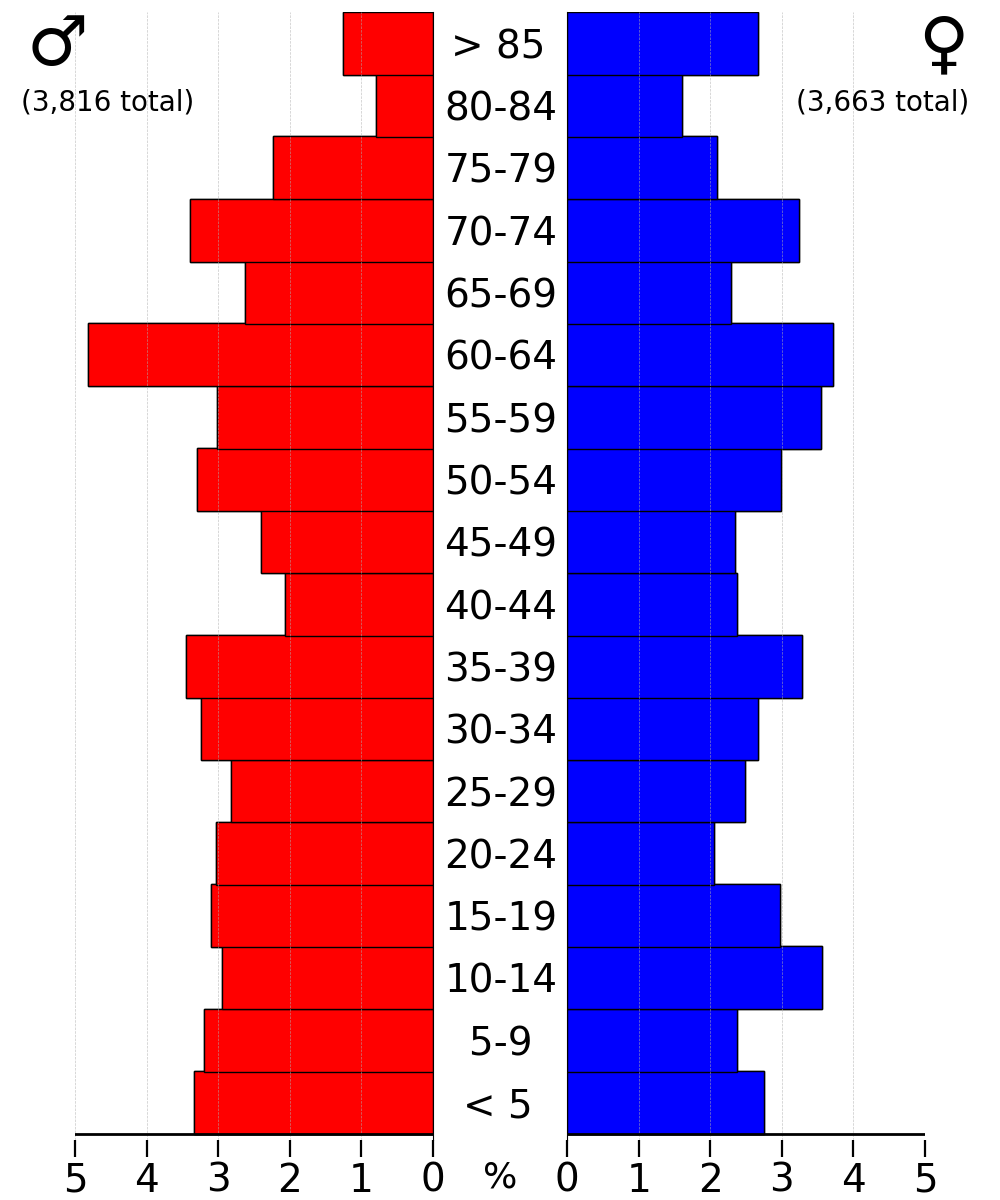
2022 US Census population pyramid for Adair County from ACS 5-year estimates

Historical population
Census	Pop.	Note	%±
1860	984		—
1870	3,982		304.7%
1880	11,667		193.0%
1890	14,534		24.6%
1900	16,192		11.4%
1910	14,420		−10.9%
1920	14,259		−1.1%
1930	13,891		−2.6%
1940	13,196		−5.0%
1950	12,292		−6.9%
1960	10,893		−11.4%
1970	9,487		−12.9%
1980	9,509		0.2%
1990	8,409		−11.6%
2000	8,243		−2.0%
2010	7,682		−6.8%
2020	7,496		−2.4%
2025 (est.)	7,403	▼	−1.2%
U.S. Decennial Census; 1790-1960 1900-1990; 1990-2000 2010-2018

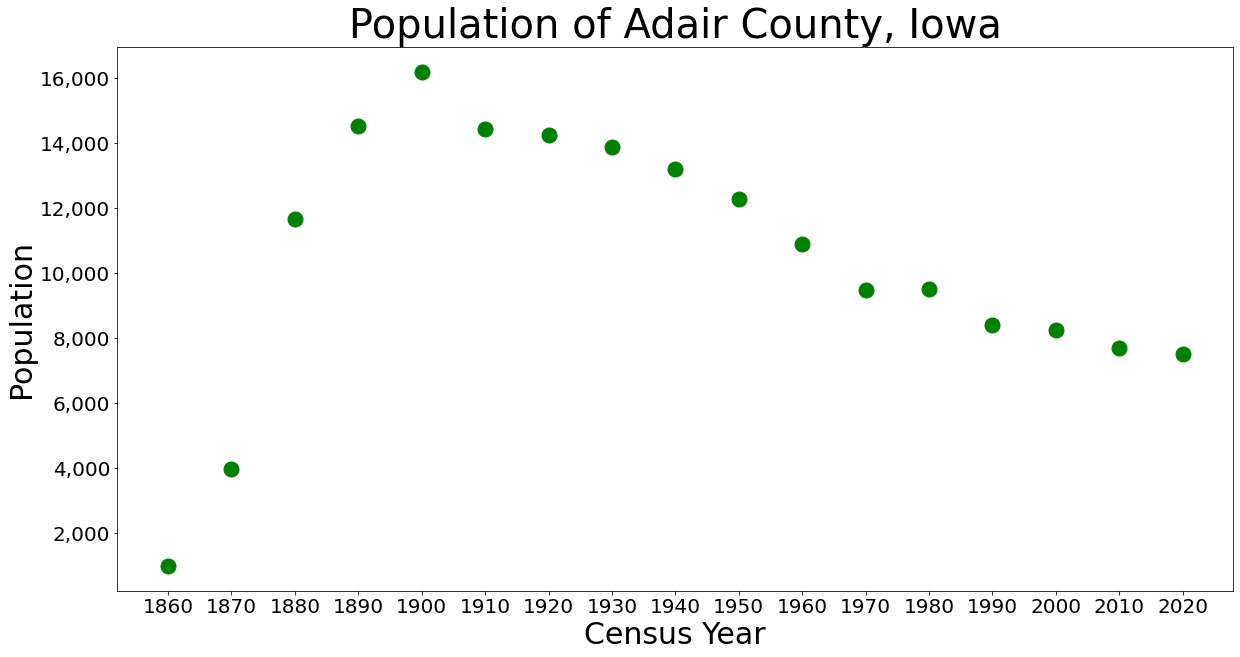
Population of Adair County from US census data

=== 2020 census ===
As of the 2020 census, the county had a population of 7,496, resulting in a population density of 12.9430/sq mi (4.9973/km^{2}). The median age was 44.0 years, with 22.2% of residents under the age of 18 and 23.4% 65 years of age or older. For every 100 females there were 98.6 males, and for every 100 females age 18 and over there were 96.3 males age 18 and over.

PL data indicates 96.88% of residents reported being of one race; 92.89% were non-Hispanic White, 0.61% were Black or African American, 2.48% were Hispanic or Latino, 0.25% were Native American, 0.31% were Asian, 0.03% were Native Hawaiian or Pacific Islander and 3.43% were some other race or more than one race. When combining single races, 95.4% were White, 0.6% were Black or African American, 0.3% were American Indian and Alaska Native, 0.3% were Asian, <0.1% were Native Hawaiian and Pacific Islander, 0.3% were some other race, and 3.1% were two or more races; Hispanic or Latino residents of any race comprised approximately 2.5% of the population.

There were 3,217 households in the county, of which 25.6% had children under the age of 18 living in them. Of all households, 50.8% were married-couple households, 19.3% were households with a male householder and no spouse or partner present, and 22.6% were households with a female householder and no spouse or partner present. About 30.4% of all households were made up of individuals and 14.1% had someone living alone who was 65 years of age or older. There were 3,585 housing units, of which 3,217 were occupied, and 10.3% were vacant; 75.6% of the occupied units were owner-occupied and 24.4% were renter-occupied, with a homeowner vacancy rate of 1.1% and a rental vacancy rate of 8.1%.

<0.1% of residents lived in urban areas, while 100.0% lived in rural areas.

=== 2010 census ===
As of the 2010 United States census, there were 7,682 people, 3,292 households, and 2,148 families residing in the county. The population density was 13.5 inhabitants per square mile (5.2/km^{2}). There were 3,698 housing units at an average density of 6.5 per square mile (2.5/km^{2}). The racial makeup of the county was 98.4% white, 0.3% Asian, 0.1% American Indian, 0.1% black or African American, 0.4% from other races, and 0.7% from two or more races. Those of Hispanic or Latino origin made up 1.3% of the population. In terms of ancestry, 42.9% were German, 12.6% were Irish, 11.9% were English, 6.7% were Danish, and 6.4% were American.

Of the 3,292 households, 26.8% had children under the age of 18 living with them, 54.9% were married couples living together, 6.7% had a female householder with no husband present, 34.8% were non-families, and 30.7% of all households were made up of individuals. The average household size was 2.29 and the average family size was 2.84. The median age was 45.3 years.

The median income for a household in the county was $45,202 and the median income for a family was $57,287. Males had a median income of $38,638 versus $31,642 for females. The per capita income for the county was $23,497. About 5.7% of families and 10.6% of the population were below the poverty line, including 13.5% of those under age 18 and 11.4% of those age 65 or over.

=== Religion ===
As of 2000, 67.9% of the population (5,597) had a declared religious affiliation, in every case Christian. The leading religious denomination was the United Methodist Church, with 23.6% of the population (1,944 members); second was the Lutheran Church–Missouri Synod, with 15.4% (1,268 members); third was the Roman Catholic church, with 12% of the population (1,003 members); and fourth was the Evangelical Lutheran church, with 11.8% of the population (978 members).

== Education ==
The county is served by four school districts:

- Nodaway Valley Community School District
- CAM Community School District
- Adair–Casey Community School District
- West Central Valley Community School District

The schools in the Nodaway Valley Community School District are:

- Nodaway Valley Elementary School
- Nodaway Valley Middle School
- Nodaway Valley High School

The schools in the Orient-Macksburg Community School District are:

- Orient-Macksburg Elementary School
- Orient-Macksburg Middle School and High School

The schools in the CAM Community School District are:

- CAM North Elementary School
- CAM South Elementary School
- CAM Middle School
- CAM High School
- CAM Iowa Connections Academy Elementary
- CAM Iowa Connections Academy Middle School
- CAM Iowa Connections Academy High School

The schools in the Adair–Casey Community School District are:

- Adair–Casey Elementary School
- AC/GC Junior High School
- Under a grade-sharing relationship with Guthrie Center Community School District, students attend AC/GC High School in Guthrie Center.

The schools in the West Central Valley Community School District are:

- Dexter Elementary School
- Stuart Elementary School
- Redfield Middle School
- Stuart High School

Former districts

- Orient-Macksburg Community School District - Dissolved on July 1, 2026.

== Communities ==
=== Cities ===
- Adair
- Bridgewater
- Casey
- Fontanelle
- Greenfield
- Orient
- Stuart

=== Unincorporated communities ===
- Arbor Hill
- Berea
- Canby
- Fisk
- Hebron
- Howe
- Leith City
- Nanito
- Prussia
- Zion

=== Townships ===
Adair County is divided into sixteen townships:

- Eureka
- Grand River
- Grove
- Harrison
- Jackson
- Jefferson
- Lee
- Lincoln
- Orient
- Prussia
- Richland
- Summerset
- Summit
- Union
- Walnut
- Washington

=== Population ranking ===
The population ranking of the following table is based on the 2020 census of Adair County.

† county seat

Rank	City/Town/etc.	Municipal type	Population (2020 Census)	Population (2024 Estimate)
1	† Greenfield	City	2,062	1,975
2	Adair (partially in Guthrie County)	City	773 (791 total)	783 (801 total)
3	Stuart (partially in Guthrie County)	City	723 (1,782 total)	723 (1,885 total)
4	Fontanelle	City	676	680
5	Orient	City	368	372
6	Bridgewater	City	148	137
7	Casey (mostly in Guthrie County)	City	19 (387 total)	21 (389 total)

== Politics ==
The county was part of Iowa's 5th congressional district, which had a score of R+9 (strongly Republican) in the Cook Partisan Voting Index. It is now part of the 3rd district.

Adair County is located within Iowa's 23rd House of Representatives district and Iowa Senate District 12.

United States presidential election results for Adair County, Iowa
Year	Republican		Democratic		Third party(ies)	
Year	No.	%	No.	%	No.	%
1896	2,127	51.74%	1,946	47.34%	38	0.92%
1900	2,327	57.86%	1,618	40.23%	77	1.91%
1904	2,303	68.22%	895	26.51%	178	5.27%
1908	2,185	61.05%	1,322	36.94%	72	2.01%
1912	1,248	36.68%	1,195	35.13%	959	28.19%
1916	1,922	53.87%	1,619	45.38%	27	0.76%
1920	4,133	74.29%	1,358	24.41%	72	1.29%
1924	4,043	67.29%	688	11.45%	1,277	21.25%
1928	4,176	68.95%	1,854	30.61%	27	0.45%
1932	2,305	46.58%	2,607	52.68%	37	0.75%
1936	3,436	50.81%	3,243	47.95%	84	1.24%
1940	3,907	58.77%	2,734	41.13%	7	0.11%
1944	3,428	59.69%	2,297	40.00%	18	0.31%
1948	2,879	52.13%	2,567	46.48%	77	1.39%
1952	4,497	71.09%	1,817	28.72%	12	0.19%
1956	3,426	59.16%	2,362	40.79%	3	0.05%
1960	3,383	60.09%	2,245	39.88%	2	0.04%
1964	1,953	40.59%	2,851	59.25%	8	0.17%
1968	2,789	60.82%	1,559	33.99%	238	5.19%
1972	3,041	63.59%	1,642	34.34%	99	2.07%
1976	2,326	49.26%	2,294	48.58%	102	2.16%
1980	2,821	60.16%	1,454	31.01%	414	8.83%
1984	2,615	56.61%	1,979	42.84%	25	0.54%
1988	1,833	44.46%	2,261	54.84%	29	0.70%
1992	1,713	40.84%	1,655	39.46%	826	19.69%
1996	1,655	42.06%	1,802	45.79%	478	12.15%
2000	2,275	55.18%	1,753	42.52%	95	2.30%
2004	2,402	56.15%	1,844	43.10%	32	0.75%
2008	2,060	50.83%	1,924	47.47%	69	1.70%
2012	2,114	52.90%	1,790	44.79%	92	2.30%
2016	2,461	64.58%	1,133	29.73%	217	5.69%
2020	2,917	69.83%	1,198	28.68%	62	1.48%
2024	2,916	71.47%	1,086	26.62%	78	1.91%

== See also ==
- National Register of Historic Places listings in Adair County, Iowa
