= Grand River Township, Adair County, Iowa =

Township in Iowa, US

Grand River Township, Adair County
- Township
- Coordinates: 41°17′15″N 094°17′51″W
- Country: United States
- State: Iowa
- County: Adair
- Organized: 1855

Area
  - Total: 36 sq mi (93 km^{2})
  - Land: 35.81 sq mi (92.75 km^{2})
  - Water: 0.097 sq mi (0.25 km^{2})
- Elevation: 1,180 ft (360 m)

Population (2020)
  - Total: 140
  - Density: 4/sq mi (1.5/km^{2})
- Time zone: UTC-6 (CST)
  - Summer (DST): UTC-5 (CDT)
- FIPS code: 19-91608
- GNIS feature ID: 0467923

Grand River Township is one of seventeen townships in Adair County, Iowa, USA. As of the 2020 census, its population was 140.

== History ==
Grand River Township was organized in 1855.

== Geography ==
Grand River Township covers an area of 35.91 square miles (93.0 km^{2}) and contains no incorporated settlements. According to the USGS, it contains three cemeteries: Boley Farm, Grand River Center and Hebron.

=== Unincorporated community ===
- Hebron
