= Prussia Township, Adair County, Iowa =

Township in Iowa, US

Prussia Township, Adair County
- Township
- Coordinates: 41°22′32″N 094°31′41″W
- Country: United States
- State: Iowa
- County: Adair

Area
  - Total: 35.5 sq mi (91.9 km^{2})
  - Land: 35.46 sq mi (91.84 km^{2})
  - Water: 0.023 sq mi (0.06 km^{2})
- Elevation: 1,350 ft (410 m)

Population (2000)
  - Total: 173
  - Density: 4.9/sq mi (1.9/km^{2})
- Time zone: UTC-6 (CST)
  - Summer (DST): UTC-5 (CDT)
- FIPS code: 19-93519
- GNIS feature ID: 0468581

Prussia Township is one of seventeen townships in Adair County, Iowa, USA. At the 2010 census, its population was 173.

== History ==
Prussia Township was organized in 1870.

== Geography ==
Prussia Township covers an area of 35.48 square miles (91.9 km^{2}) and contains no incorporated settlements. According to the USGS, it contains two cemeteries: Immanuel Lutheran and Prussia.
