= Lincoln Township, Adair County, Iowa =

Township in Iowa, US

Lincoln Township, Adair County
- Township
- Coordinates: 41°27′32″N 094°18′05″W
- Country: United States
- State: Iowa
- County: Adair

Area
  - Total: 35.63 sq mi (92.29 km^{2})
  - Land: 35.63 sq mi (92.27 km^{2})
  - Water: 0.0077 sq mi (0.02 km^{2})
- Elevation: 1,184 ft (361 m)

Population (2010)
  - Total: 926
  - Density: 26/sq mi (10/km^{2})
- Time zone: UTC-6 (CST)
  - Summer (DST): UTC-5 (CDT)
- FIPS code: 19-92514
- GNIS feature ID: 0468237

Lincoln Township is one of seventeen townships in Adair County, Iowa, USA. At the 2010 census, its population was 926.

== History ==
Lincoln Township was organized in 1861.

== Geography ==
Lincoln Township covers an area of 35.63 square miles (92.3 km^{2}) and contains one incorporated settlement, Stuart. According to the USGS, it contains one cemetery, Calvary.
