= A. H. Wilkinson =

American businessman and politician

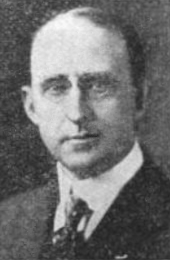

Member of the Wisconsin State Senate
- In office 1917–1921

Personal details
- Born: July 23, 1875 Stuart, Iowa, US
- Died: June 18, 1954 (aged 78) Milwaukee, Wisconsin, US
- Party: Republican
- Spouse: Lillia Tate (m. 1901)
- Occupation: Businessman, politician

Alonzo H. Wilkinson (July 23, 1875 – June 18, 1954) was an American businessman and politician.

== Biography ==
Alonzo H. Wilkinson was born in Stuart, Iowa on July 23, 1875. He moved with his parents to Cumberland, Wisconsin and then to Bayfield, Wisconsin. He went to public schools. He started the Bayfield National Bank, and was president of the Wisconsin State Board of Agriculture. He married Lillia Tate on June 16, 1901.

Wilkinson was involved with the Republican Party. He served as town treasurer from 1897 to 1899 and as Bayfield County treasurer from 1901 to 1904. During World War I, Wilkinson served on the county draft board. From 1917 to 1921, Wilkinson served in the Wisconsin State Senate. In 1921, Wilkinson was appointed internal revenue collector and served until 1933. He lived in Milwaukee, Wisconsin where he worked as a tax consultant. Wilkinson died of cancer in Milwaukee on June 18, 1954.
