= Eureka Township, Adair County, Iowa =

Township in Iowa, US

Eureka Township
- Township
- Location in Adair County
- Coordinates: 41°22′29″N 94°38′38″W
- Country: United States
- State: Iowa
- County: Adair

Area
  - Total: 35.59 sq mi (92.19 km^{2})
  - Land: 35.54 sq mi (92.06 km^{2})
  - Water: 0.050 sq mi (0.13 km^{2}) 0.14%
- Elevation: 1,306 ft (398 m)

Population (2020)
  - Total: 101
  - Density: 2.6/sq mi (1/km^{2})
- Time zone: UTC-6 (CST)
  - Summer (DST): UTC-5 (CDT)
- ZIP codes: 50846, 50849
- GNIS feature ID: 0467800

Eureka Township is one of the seventeen townships of Adair County, Iowa, United States. At the 2020 census, its population was 101.

== History ==
Eureka Township was organized in 1870. "Eureka!" is said to have exclaimed by an early settler when he discovered coal within the township borders. It was served by Berea post office from 1894 to 1908, named after the Ancient Greek city of Berea.

== Geography ==
According to the United States Census Bureau, Eureka Township covers an area of 35.59 square miles (92.19 square kilometers); of this, 0.05 square miles (0.13 square kilometers) or 0.14 percent is water.

=== Cities ===
- Fontanelle

=== Extinct towns ===
- Berea

=== Cemeteries ===
The township contains one cemetery, Eureka.

=== Major highways ===
- Iowa Highway 92

=== Lakes ===
- Nodaway Lake

=== Landmarks ===
- Ken Sidey Nature Area County Park
- Nodaway Park

== School districts ==
- Nodaway Valley Community School District

== Political districts ==
- Iowa's 4th congressional district
- State House District 58
- State Senate District 29
