= Stuart, Iowa =

- City
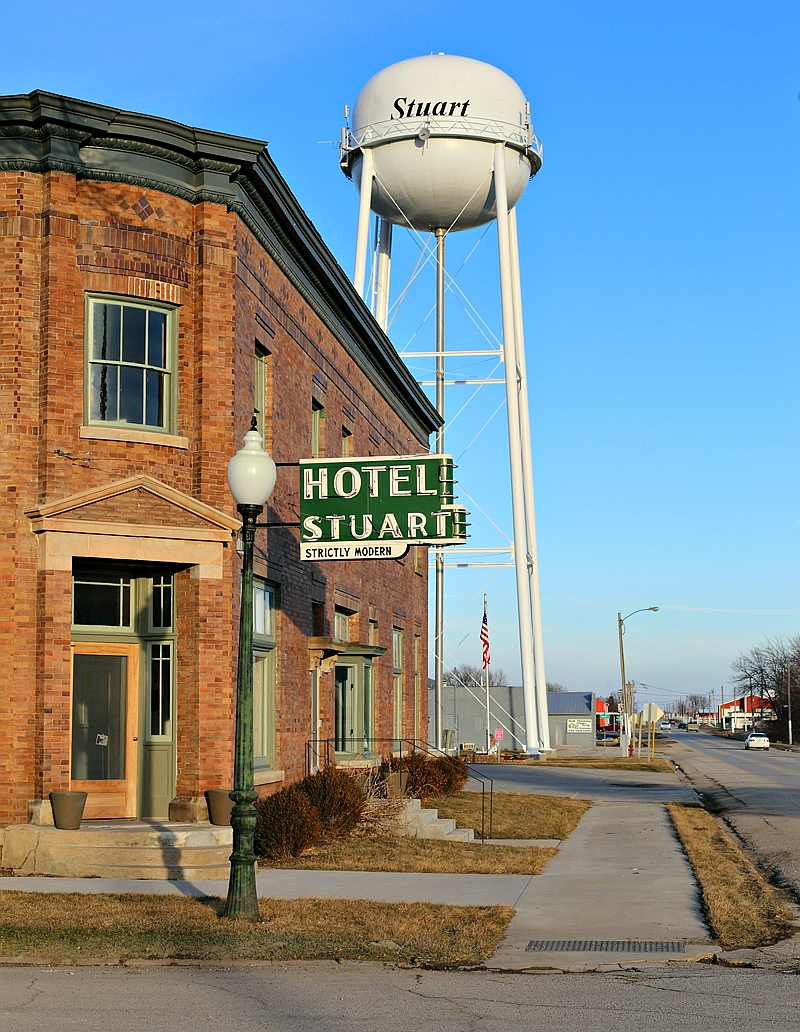
- Hotel Stuart

- Logo

- Location of Stuart, Iowa
- Coordinates: 41°29′53″N 94°19′11″W
- Country: United States
- State: Iowa
- Counties: Guthrie, Adair
- Township: Lincoln (Adair County), Stuart (Guthrie County)
- Established: 1868
- Platted: September 29, 1870
- Incorporated: February 6, 1887
- Founder: Captain Charles Stewart

Area
  - Total: 2.78 sq mi (7.21 km^{2})
  - Land: 2.78 sq mi (7.21 km^{2})
  - Water: 0 sq mi (0.00 km^{2})
- Elevation: 1,204 ft (367 m)

Population (2020)
  - Total: 1,782
  - Density: 640.3/sq mi (247.22/km^{2})
- Time zone: UTC-6 (Central (CST))
  - Summer (DST): UTC-5 (CDT)
- ZIP code: 50250
- Area code: 515
- FIPS code: 19-75990
- GNIS feature ID: 2395991
- Website: www.stuartia.com

Stuart is a city in Lincoln Township in Adair County, and Stuart Township in Guthrie County, in the U.S. state of Iowa. That part of the city within Guthrie County is part of the Des Moines–West Des Moines Metropolitan Statistical Area. The population was 1,782 at the 2020 census.

== History ==
Stuart got its start in the late 1860s, following construction of the Chicago, Rock Island and Pacific Railroad through the territory. It is named for Captain Charles Stuart, who was instrumental in bringing the railroad to the city and also founded the city itself.

The settlement was platted on September 29, 1870 and on February 6, 1887, Stuart was officially incorporated.

== Geography ==
According to the United States Census Bureau, the city has a total area of 2.58 square miles (6.68 km^{2}), all land.

== Demographics ==
Historical Populations
Year	Pop.	±%
1880	1,994	—
1890	2,052	+2.9%
1900	2,079	+1.3%
1910	1,826	−12.2%
1920	1,716	−6.0%
1930	1,626	−5.2%
1940	1,611	−0.9%
1950	1,500	−6.9%
1960	1,486	−0.9%
1970	1,354	−8.9%
1980	1,650	+21.9%
1990	1,522	−7.8%
2000	1,712	+12.5%
2010	1,648	−3.7%
2020	1,782	+8.1%
Source:"U.S. Census website". United States Census Bureau. and Iowa Data Center; Source: U.S. Decennial Census

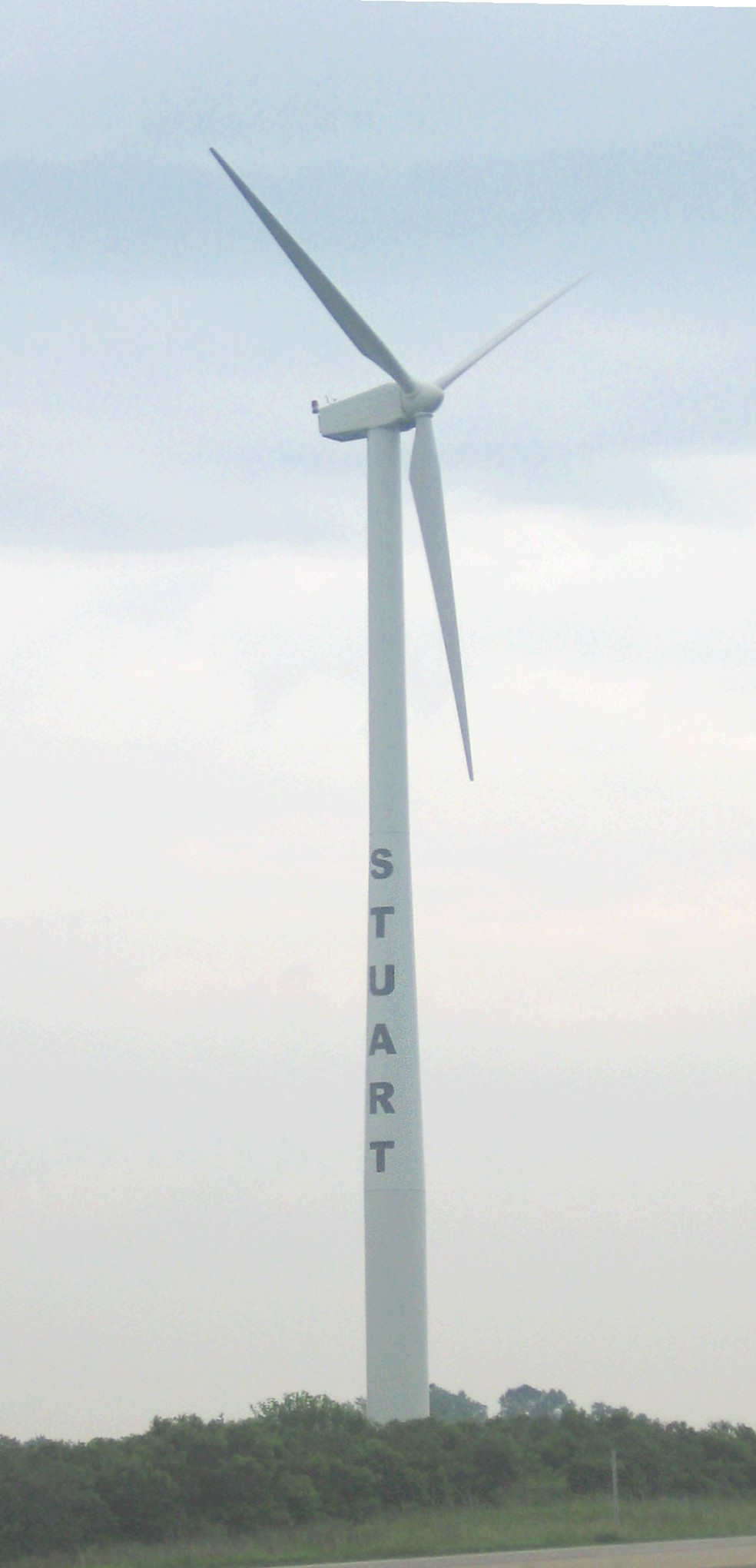
Wind turbine outside Stuart

=== 2020 census ===
As of the 2020 census, there were 1,782 people, 733 households, and 457 families residing in the city. The population density was 640.3 inhabitants per square mile (247.2/km^{2}), and there were 818 housing units at an average density of 293.9 per square mile (113.5/km^{2}).

There were 733 households, of which 29.3% had children under the age of 18 living with them. Of all households, 46.0% were married couples living together, 9.8% were cohabitating couples, 25.1% had a female householder with no spouse or partner present, and 19.1% had a male householder with no spouse or partner present. In total, 37.7% of households were non-families, 30.0% of all households were made up of individuals, and 14.6% had someone living alone who was 65 years old or older. Of the housing units, 10.4% were vacant; the homeowner vacancy rate was 3.1% and the rental vacancy rate was 15.9%.

The median age was 39.3 years, and 24.7% of residents were under the age of 18. By broader age groups, 26.7% of residents were under the age of 20; 5.1% were between the ages of 20 and 24; 24.6% were from 25 and 44; 21.2% were from 45 and 64; and 22.4% were 65 years of age or older. The gender makeup of the city was 48.4% male and 51.6% female. For every 100 females there were 93.9 males, and for every 100 females age 18 and over there were 88.3 males age 18 and over.

0.0% of residents lived in urban areas, while 100.0% lived in rural areas.

Racial composition as of the 2020 census
Race	Number	Percent
White	1,674	93.9%
Black or African American	17	1.0%
American Indian and Alaska Native	5	0.3%
Asian	6	0.3%
Native Hawaiian and Other Pacific Islander	2	0.1%
Some other race	7	0.4%
Two or more races	71	4.0%
Hispanic or Latino (of any race)	59	3.3%

=== 2010 census ===
As of the census of 2010, there were 1,648 people, 667 households, and 423 families living in the city. The population density was 638.8 inhabitants per square mile (246.6/km^{2}). There were 746 housing units at an average density of 289.1 per square mile (111.6/km^{2}). The racial makeup of the city was 97.1% White, 0.4% African American, 0.2% Native American, 0.2% Asian, 0.6% from other races, and 1.6% from two or more races. Hispanic or Latino of any race were 2.5% of the population.

There were 667 households, of which 31.0% had children under the age of 18 living with them, 46.9% were married couples living together, 11.5% had a female householder with no husband present, 4.9% had a male householder with no wife present, and 36.6% were non-families. 31.0% of all households were made up of individuals, and 15.1% had someone living alone who was 65 years of age or older. The average household size was 2.34 and the average family size was 2.91.

The median age in the city was 41.5 years. 24.5% of residents were under the age of 18; 6.6% were between the ages of 18 and 24; 22.9% were from 25 to 44; 25.6% were from 45 to 64; and 20.4% were 65 years of age or older. The gender makeup of the city was 48.4% male and 51.6% female.

=== 2000 census ===
As of the census of 2000, there were 1,712 people, 695 households, and 460 families living in the city. The population density was 846.0 inhabitants per square mile (326.6/km^{2}). There were 742 housing units at an average density of 366.7 per square mile (141.6/km^{2}). The racial makeup of the city was 98.36% White, 0.06% African American, 0.06% Native American, 0.18% Asian, 0.53% from other races, and 0.82% from two or more races. Hispanic or Latino of any race were 1.11% of the population.

There were 695 households, out of which 30.8% had children under the age of 18 living with them, 51.9% were married couples living together, 10.5% had a female householder with no husband present, and 33.7% were non-families. 29.6% of all households were made up of individuals, and 17.0% had someone living alone who was 65 years of age or older. The average household size was 2.37 and the average family size was 2.92.

24.3% were under the age of 18, 7.5% from 18 to 24, 25.6% from 25 to 44, 20.9% from 45 to 64, and 21.7% were 65 years of age or older. The median age was 40 years. For every 100 females, there were 93.7 males. For every 100 females age 18 and over, there were 85.4 males.

The median income for a household in the city was $33,491, and the median income for a family was $41,600. Males had a median income of $31,156 versus $21,638 for females. The per capita income for the city was $17,113. About 6.6% of families and 8.4% of the population were below the poverty line, including 9.8% of those under age 18 and 6.1% of those age 65 or over.

== Education ==
Stuart is within the West Central Valley Community School District. The district was established on July 1, 2001 by the merger of the Stuart-Menlo Community School District and the Dexfield Community School District. The former was established on July 1, 1971 by the merger of the Stuart and Menlo school districts.

== Notable people ==
- Osborn Deignan - received Medal of Honor for actions in the Spanish–American War
- William R. Peers - US Army General - Presided over the Peers Commission of the My Lai massacre
- Buck Shaw - football player on the first undefeated University of Notre Dame football team
- A. H. Wilkinson- Wisconsin state senator; born in Stuart.

== See also ==
Four buildings in town are listed on the National Register of Historic Places:

- The former All Saints Catholic Church (1910)
- Chicago, Rock Island and Pacific Railroad: Stuart Passenger Station (1869)
- Masonic Temple Building (1894)
- Sexton Hotel (1907)
