= Hebron, Iowa =

- Unincorporated community
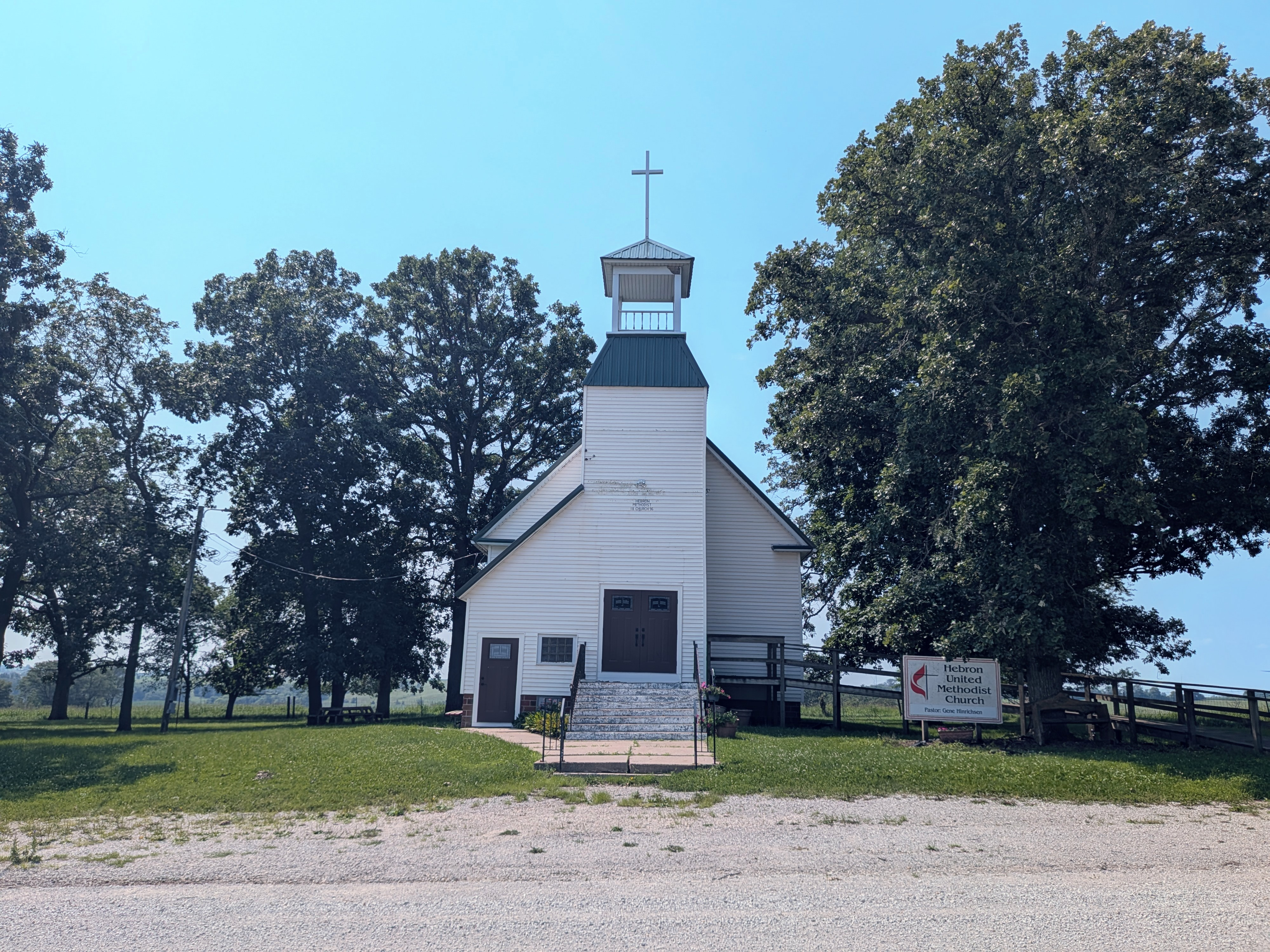
- Hebron United Methodist Church

- Location within Iowa
- Coordinates: 41°15′17″N 94°17′07″W
- Country: United States
- State: Iowa
- County: Adair
- Township: Grand River
- Elevation: 1,240 ft (380 m)
- Time zone: UTC-6 (Central (CST))
  - Summer (DST): UTC-5 (CDT)
- ZIP code: 50858
- Area code: 641
- GNIS feature ID: 464575

Hebron is an unincorporated town in Grand River Township, Adair County, Iowa, United States.

== Geography ==
Hebron is located in the southeastern part of Grand River Township, near the Grand River. It is near the junction of Vinton Avenue and 270th Street.

== History ==
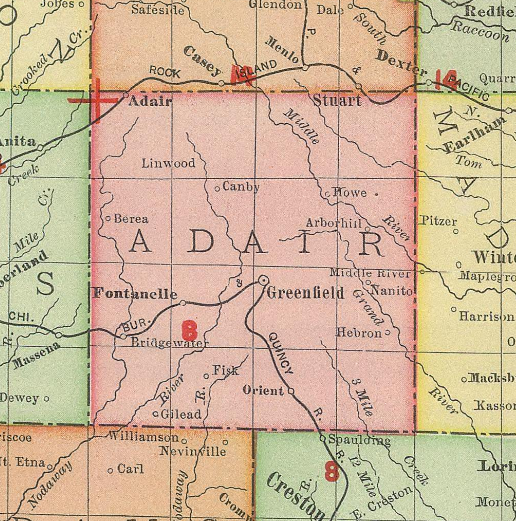
Hebron appeared on the Rand McNally state map of Iowa in 1903.

Founded in the 1800s, Hebron was named after the ancient city of Hebron.

The Hebron Creamery operated in the community circa 1904. Other businesses included a general store, a barber shop, an ice house, a saw mill, and a blacksmith shop. A school, a post office, and the Hebron Methodist Church also operated in the community. The church is still in operation.

Hebron's population was 106 in 1902, and 66 in 1925. The population was 16 in 1940.

The Hebron Cemetery is located in the community.

== See also ==
- Zion, Iowa
