= Walnut Township, Adair County, Iowa =

Township in Iowa, US

Walnut Township, Adair County
- Township
- Coordinates: 41°27′39″N 094°31′48″W
- Country: United States
- State: Iowa
- County: Adair

Area
  - Total: 35.65 sq mi (92.34 km^{2})
  - Land: 35.55 sq mi (92.07 km^{2})
  - Water: 0.10 sq mi (0.27 km^{2})
- Elevation: 1,286 ft (392 m)

Population (2010)
  - Total: 176
  - Density: 4.9/sq mi (1.9/km^{2})
- Time zone: UTC-6 (CST)
  - Summer (DST): UTC-5 (CDT)
- FIPS code: 19-94389
- GNIS feature ID: 0468881

Walnut Township is one of seventeen townships in Adair County, Iowa, USA. At the 2010 census, its population was 176.

== Geography ==
Walnut Township covers an area of 35.65 square miles (92.3 km^{2}) and contains no incorporated settlements. According to the USGS, it contains four cemeteries: Abandoned Timber, Canby, Oakwood and Saint Josephs.
