= Grove Township, Adair County, Iowa =

Township in Iowa, US

Grove Township, Adair County
- Township
- Coordinates: 41°22′24″N 094°24′31″W
- Country: United States
- State: Iowa
- County: Adair
- Organized: 1860

Area
  - Total: 35.42 sq mi (91.74 km^{2})
  - Land: 35.33 sq mi (91.51 km^{2})
  - Water: 0.089 sq mi (0.23 km^{2})
- Elevation: 1,263 ft (385 m)

Population (2010)
  - Total: 162
  - Density: 4.59/sq mi (1.77/km^{2})
- Time zone: UTC-6 (CST)
  - Summer (DST): UTC-5 (CDT)
- FIPS code: 19-91776
- GNIS feature ID: 0467980

Grove Township is one of seventeen townships in Adair County, Iowa, USA. At the 2020 census, its population was 162.

== History ==
Grove Township was organized in 1860.

== Geography ==
Grove Township covers an area of 35.42 square miles (91.7 km^{2}) and contains no incorporated settlements. According to the USGS, it contains two cemeteries: Adair County and Grove Center.

=== Unincorporated communities ===
- Howe
