= Zion, Iowa =

- former unincorporated community
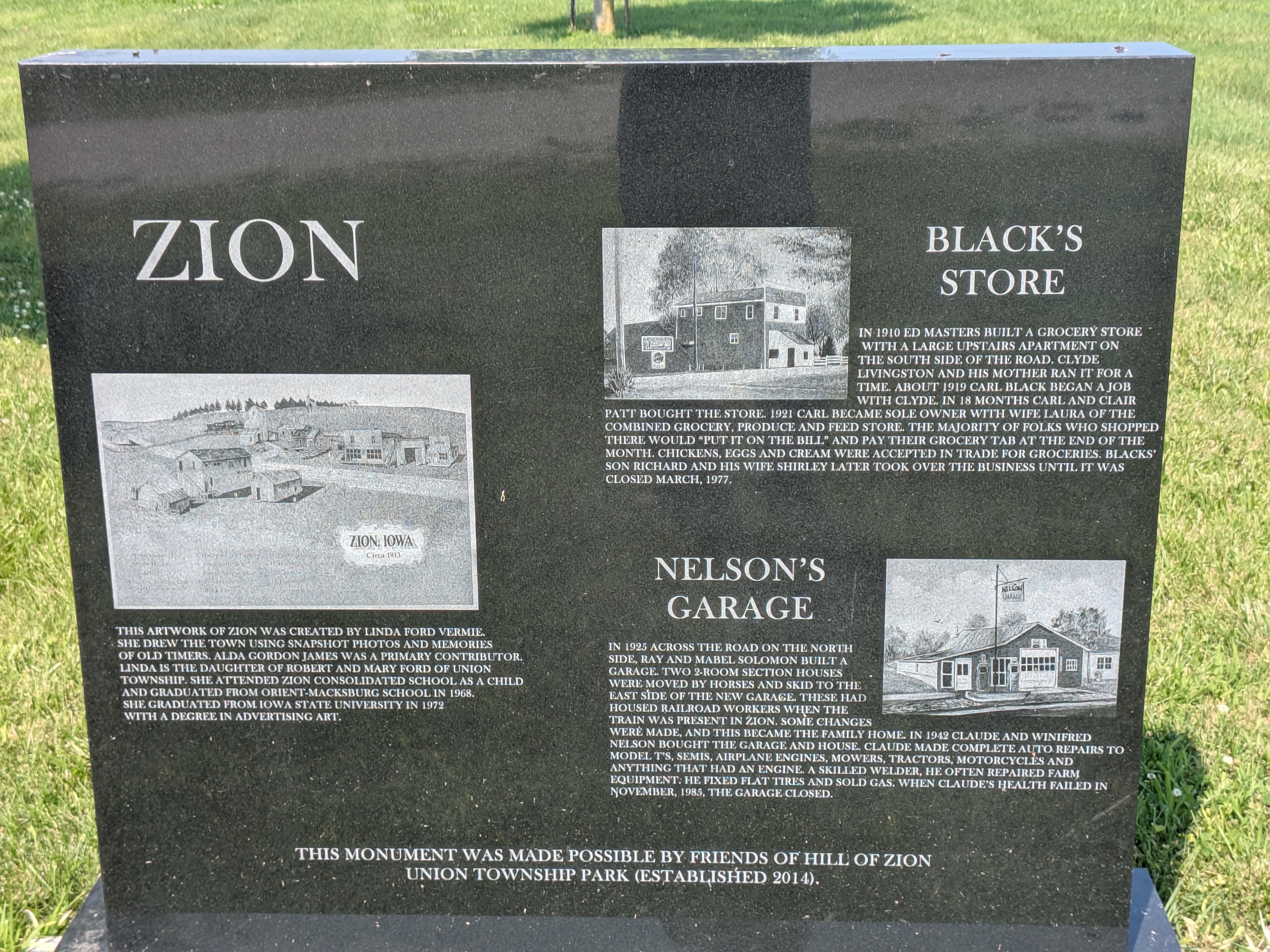
- A marker in Zion, at the site of the former school

- Location within Iowa
- Coordinates: 41°12′02″N 94°17′56″W
- Country: United States
- State: Iowa
- County: Adair
- Elevation: 1,204 ft (367 m)
- Time zone: UTC-6 (Central (CST))
  - Summer (DST): UTC-5 (CDT)
- GNIS feature ID: 464814

Zion and Leith City are former unincorporated communities in Adair County, in the U.S. state of Iowa.

== Geography ==
Zion was at the corner of Victor Avenue and County Highway G61.

Leith City was in Section 20 of Union Township, on Union Avenue.

== History ==
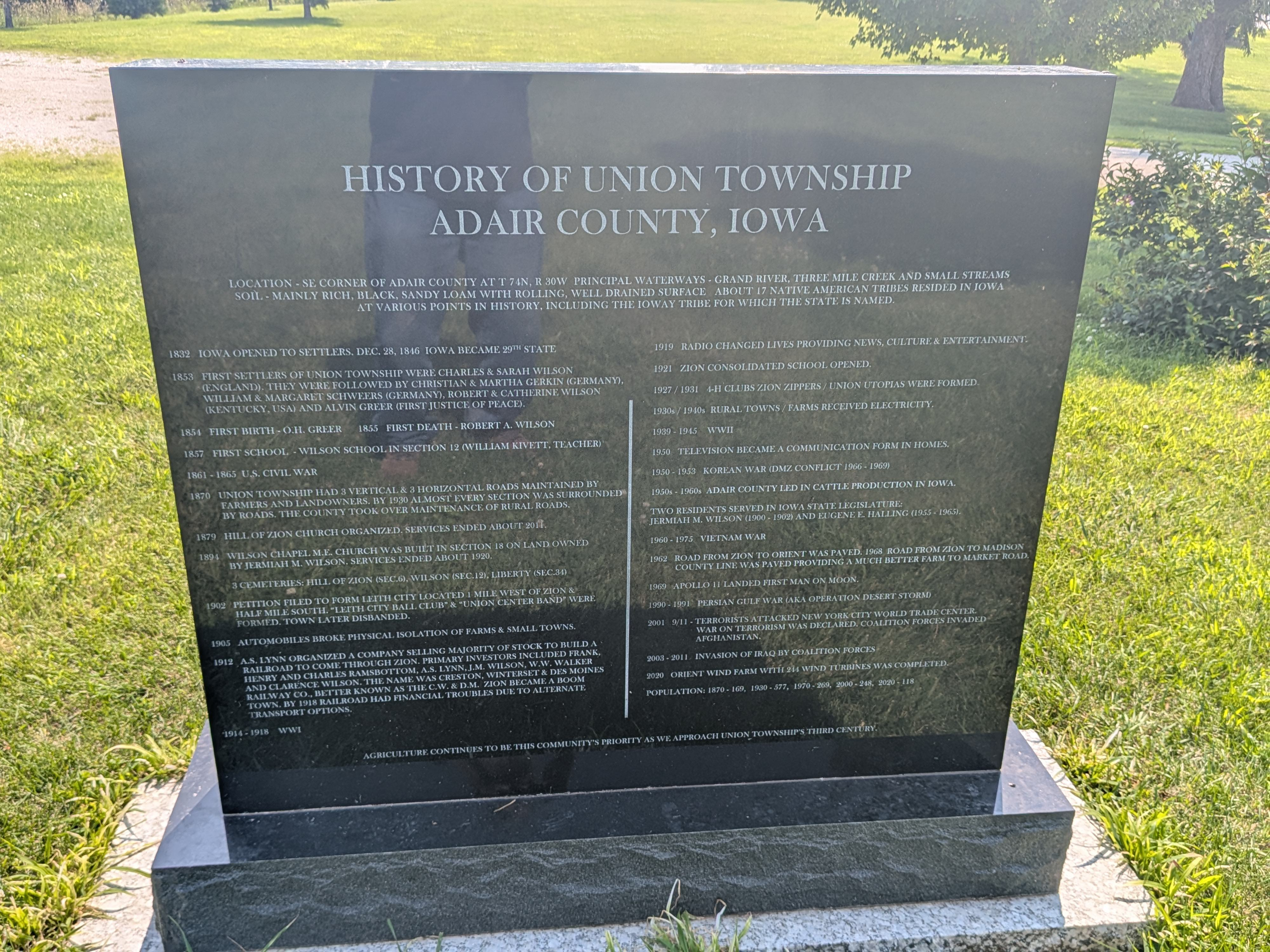
A marker in Zion that lists important events in Union Township history

Zion, founded in the late 1800s in the center of Union Township, was home to the original Hill of Zion Christian Church, as well as a later replacement. The Zion Consolidated School District was formed in 1919, and at one point enrolled 165 students.

Hill of Zion Church was built in Zion in 1892. Additions to the church were made in 1918 and again in 1927. The church could seat 300. The Zion school served all grades and had seven teachers in 1929. The area also had an active farm bureau.

Leith City (later spelled Leath City) was platted in 1902, less than a mile away from Zion in Sections 20 and 21. Advertisements for electrified plots of land in Leith City ran in the Iowa State Gazetteer and Business Directory in 1905. These communities did not incorporate.

Circa 1912, the Creston, Winterset and Des Moines Railway (CW&DM) was built through the area.

Zion's population was just 6 in 1925. Hill of Zion Cemetery is located in Zion, adjacent to the church.

The area holds an annual picnic.

== See also ==
- Hebron, Iowa
