= Washington Township, Adair County, Iowa =

Township in Iowa, US

Washington Township, Adair County
- Township
- Coordinates: 41°12′00″N 094°38′21″W
- Country: United States
- State: Iowa
- County: Adair

Area
  - Total: 35.62 sq mi (92.25 km^{2})
  - Land: 35.6 sq mi (92.1 km^{2})
  - Water: 0.062 sq mi (0.16 km^{2})
- Elevation: 1,178 ft (359 m)

Population (2010)
  - Total: 145
  - Density: 4.1/sq mi (1.6/km^{2})
- Time zone: UTC-6 (CST)
  - Summer (DST): UTC-5 (CDT)
- FIPS code: 19-94443
- GNIS feature ID: 0468899

Washington Township is one of seventeen townships in Adair County, Iowa, USA. At the 2010 census, its population was 145.

== History ==
Washington Township was organized in 1854.

== Geography ==
Washington Township covers an area of 35.62 square miles (92.3 km^{2}) and contains no incorporated settlements. According to the USGS, it contains six cemeteries: Avondale, Campbell, Garner, Mormon, Winn and Witt.
