= Harrison Township, Adair County, Iowa =

Township in Iowa, US

Harrison Township, Adair County
- Township
- Coordinates: 41°22′29″N 094°17′53″W
- Country: United States
- State: Iowa
- County: Adair
- Organized: 1856

Area
  - Total: 35.9 sq mi (92.9 km^{2})
  - Land: 35.84 sq mi (92.83 km^{2})
  - Water: 0.031 sq mi (0.08 km^{2})
- Elevation: 1,145 ft (349 m)

Population (2010)
  - Total: 178
  - Density: 4.9/sq mi (1.9/km^{2})
- Time zone: UTC-6 (CST)
  - Summer (DST): UTC-5 (CDT)
- FIPS code: 19-91854
- GNIS feature ID: 0468009

Harrison Township is one of seventeen townships in Adair County, Iowa, USA. As of the 2020 census, its population was 178.

== History ==
Harrison Township was organized in 1856. It was served by the Arbor Hill post office (41°22′00″N 94°19′06″W) from 1857 to 1907.

== Geography ==
Harrison Township covers an area of 35.87 square miles (92.9 km^{2}) and contains no incorporated settlements. According to the USGS, it contains two cemeteries: Fairview and Roberts.

=== Unincorporated communities ===
- Arbor Hill
