= Berea, Iowa =

- Unincorporated community
- Location within Iowa
- Coordinates: 41°22′27″N 94°40′49″W
- Country: United States
- State: Iowa
- County: Adair
- Township: Eureka
- Named after: Berea (Bible)
- Elevation: 1,306 ft (398 m)
- Time zone: UTC-6 (Central (CST))
  - Summer (DST): UTC-5 (CDT)
- Area code: 641
- GNIS feature ID: 464460

Berea was an unincorporated community in Eureka Township, Adair County, Iowa, United States.

== Geography ==
Berea was founded along the banks of the Middle Nodaway River; It was in Eureka Township.

== History ==
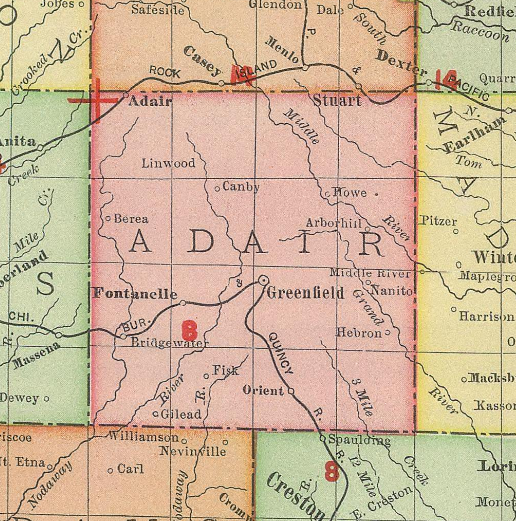
Berea was located in western Adair County.

Berea was named after the Ancient Greek city of Berea. The community was founded by Ned Brown and Alexander Broadfoot, who were early settlers, and its peak population was around 100 residents.

According to the Anita News, "Berea started as an o!d trading post but the village grew until it boasted a population of one hundred, with everal prosperous business houses, including three general stores, a postoffice, blacksmith shop, large implement store with a community hall on the second floor, and a slaughter house."

A post office called Berea was established in 1894, and remained in operation until 1908. In 1905, the community was reported to have a population of 40, with a general store, a pharmacist, a creamery, a blacksmith and a wagonmaker. The Berea Store was built in June 1909, replacing an earlier store which had been destroyed by fire.

In 1915, Berea was described as a village, with the Berea Horse Company being a noted business, owned by brothers Isaac Brown and A.R. Brown. At that time, Berea had a town band which performed at community events. Around that time, Berea's population was estimated at 50 residents.

The Berea Gospel Hall was built in 1929. Around this time, the Iowa Department of Public Instruction praised the Berea School, stating that the school was "an outstanding example of what can be done to transform an unpromising situation into an usually efficient school."

The Rock Island Railroad passed through nearby Anita and Adair, and it was for this reason that Berea began to decline. A school still operated at Berea in the 1930s, but most other services had closed by this time. In 1936, the Berea School closed due to lack of pupils, and by the 1940s, the community was called a "ghost village". By that time, Berea had only a general store, the closed school, and the Berea Gospel Hall.

The population was 30 in 1940.

The Berea Store was purchased by the Arnold family in 1950.

Berea still appeared on state maps as late as 1960.

== See also ==
- Zion, Iowa
