= Sexton Hotel =

- U.S. National Register of Historic Places
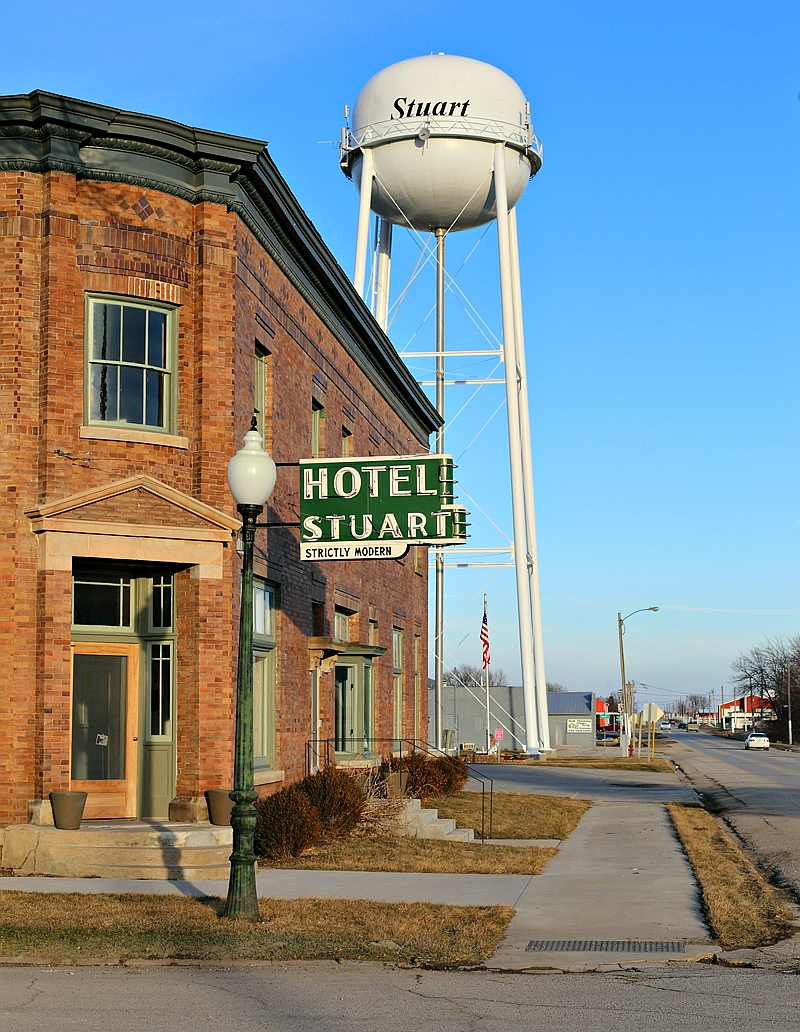

- Location within Iowa Location within the United States
- Location: 203 E. Front Street; Stuart, Iowa
- Coordinates: 41°30′14″N 94°19′0″W
- Built: 1907
- Architectural style: Neoclassical Revival
- NRHP reference No.: 13000924
- Added to NRHP: December 18, 2013

The Sexton Hotel, also known as Hotel Stuart, is a historical building located in Stuart, Iowa, United States. The building is a two-story, L-shaped, brick and brick veneer structure that was built in two parts. The oldest section was a frame building built by John Sexton in 1893 and housed a restaurant. It was moved to the north and the brick hotel wing was built by Sexton in 1907. The older structure, now the north wing of the larger building, was covered with brick veneer. The primary entry into the hotel is located in the canted entrance bay on the southwest corner of the building. There were 28 guest rooms, and the first floor of the north wing housed the dining hall. The first floor also housed a large lobby, the owners quarters, and some of the guest rooms.

The hotel served the needs of rail and highway travelers. It sat across the street from the Chicago, Rock Island and Pacific Railroad depot, which is still standing. Front Street was a part of the first major highway across Iowa known as the "Great White Way", or the "White Pole Road." It later became U.S. Route 6. In the 1920 the name of the hotel was changed to Hotel Stuart. The hotel became an agent for the Greyhound Bus Lines in 1938. Interstate 80 opened to the south of Stuart in 1960, and took highway traffic away from town. The rail depot also closed. Hotel operations were discontinued in the 1970s, and the building served as an apartment building until 1999. It was listed on the National Register of Historic Places in 2013.
