= Jack E. Conger =

American flying ace (1921–2006)

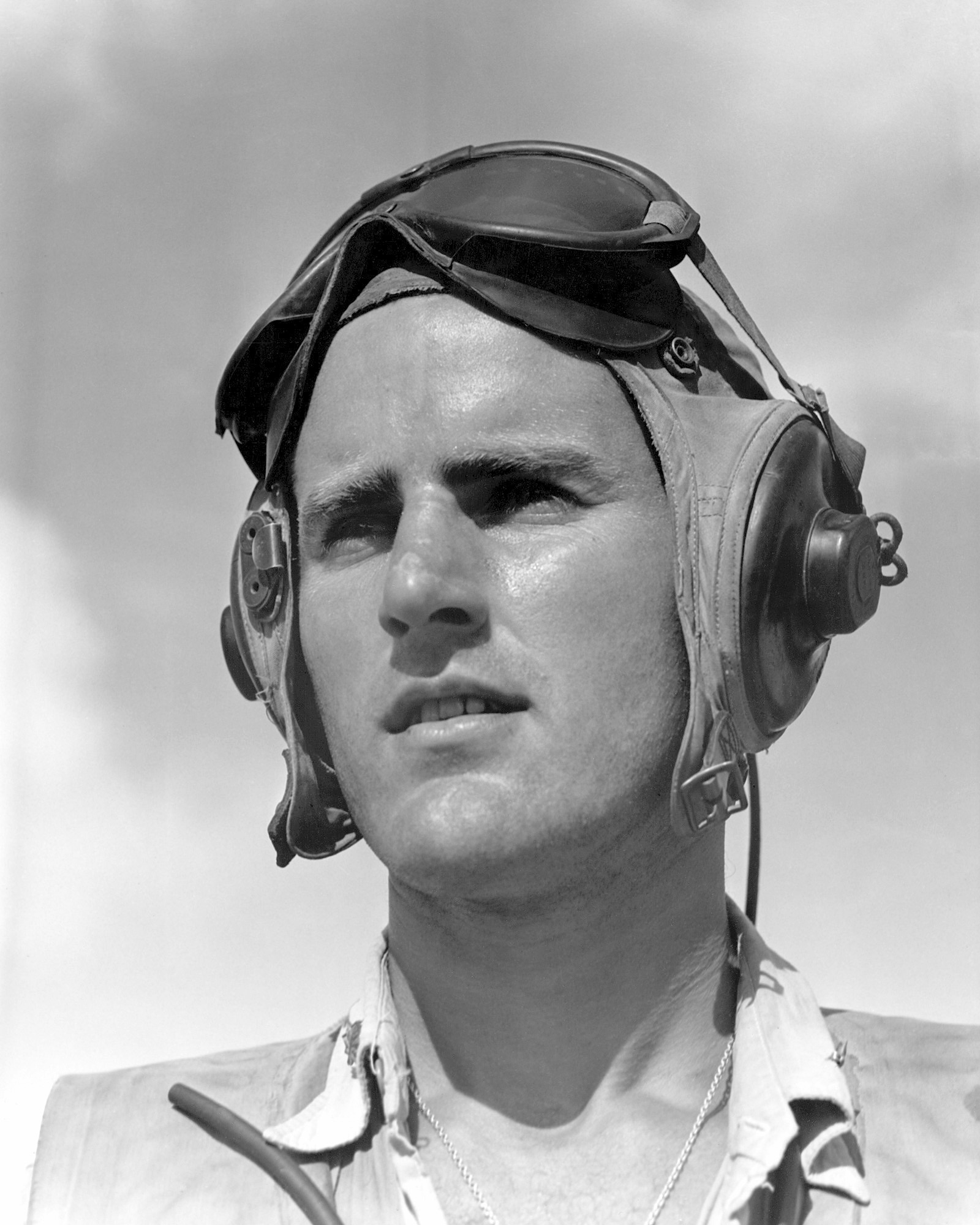
- Conger, c. 1944, following his promotion to major
- Born: Jack Eugene Conger; April 6, 1921; Orient, Iowa, U.S.
- Died: April 22, 2006 (aged 85) Havelock, North Carolina, U.S.
- Buried: Arlington National Cemetery
- Allegiance: United States
- Branch: United States Marine Corps
- Service years: 1941–1964
- Rank: Colonel
- Conflicts: World War II: Guadalcanal campaign; Philippines campaign (1944–1945); Korean War
- Awards: Navy Cross; Distinguished Flying Cross (2); Air Medal (5)

Jack Eugene Conger (April 6, 1921 – April 22, 2006) was a highly decorated United States Marine Corps officer. He was a flying ace credited with shooting down ten enemy aircraft and was awarded the Navy Cross during World War II.

== Early life ==
Jack E. Conger was born on April 6, 1921, in Orient, Iowa. While in high school, he worked at a movie theater in Sioux Falls, South Dakota. One day, Conger escorted another future Marine flying ace, Joe Foss, out of the theater after he had snuck in.

== World War II ==
Conger enlisted into the Marine Corps from Des Moines in March 1941. He was designated as a Naval Aviator and assigned to Marine Fighting Squadron 212 (VMF-212) with the outbreak of World War II.

VMF-212 arrived at Henderson Field on Guadalcanal in October 1942. Henderson Field was being bombed daily by Japanese aircraft, and the squadrons operating from the airfield were dubbed the Cactus Air Force. First Lieutenant Conger began flying combat missions on October 16, intercepting and shooting down Japanese bombers and strafing enemy ships and ground positions.

On October 25, First Lieutenant Conger shot down three A6M Zeros during a dogfight. Conger then pursued a fourth Zero, piloted by flying ace Petty Officer Second Class Shiro Ishikawa. Expending the last of his ammunition and determined to knock the plane out of the sky, Conger attempted to use his propeller to chop the tail rudder off Ishikawa's plane. Conger, misjudging the distance between his and Ishikawa's plane, rammed into it and ripped the entire tail off. Both planes then began falling out of the sky, and both pilots bailed out and parachuted into the sea.

A Marine rescue boat picked Lieutenant Conger up out of the water, and Conger convinced the Marines not to shoot Ishikawa. Conger reached his hand out to pull Ishikawa aboard the boat, but Ishikawa attempted to shoot Conger with his Nambu pistol. When the waterlogged pistol misfired, Conger threw himself backward and injured his back. Ishikawa then attempted to shoot himself and the pistol misfired again. Conger hit Ishikawa over the head with a gas can and pulled him into the boat.

VMF-212 left Guadalcanal in November 1942. For his bravery in shooting down ten enemy aircraft at Guadalcanal, First Lieutenant Conger was awarded the Navy Cross.

In March 1944, Major Conger was assigned to Marine Fighter Squadron 114 (VMF-114). Conger participated in strafing missions in the Solomon Islands and Western Caroline Islands until February 1945. In March of 1945, he strafed Japanese equipment and positions in the Philippine Islands. Conger was awarded two Distinguished Flying Crosses during this period.

== Later career and life ==
Conger later saw action during the Korean War. He retired from the Marines with the rank of colonel in 1964.

In April 1990, Conger met with Ishikawa at the National Museum of the Pacific War at Fredericksburg, Texas. Ishikawa thanked Conger for saving his life 48 years earlier at Guadalcanal, which allowed him to raise a family.

Conger died on April 22, 2006, in Havelock, North Carolina. He was buried in Arlington National Cemetery.

== See also ==
- List of World War II aces from the United States
- List of Navy Cross recipients for World War II
