= Orient, Iowa =

- City
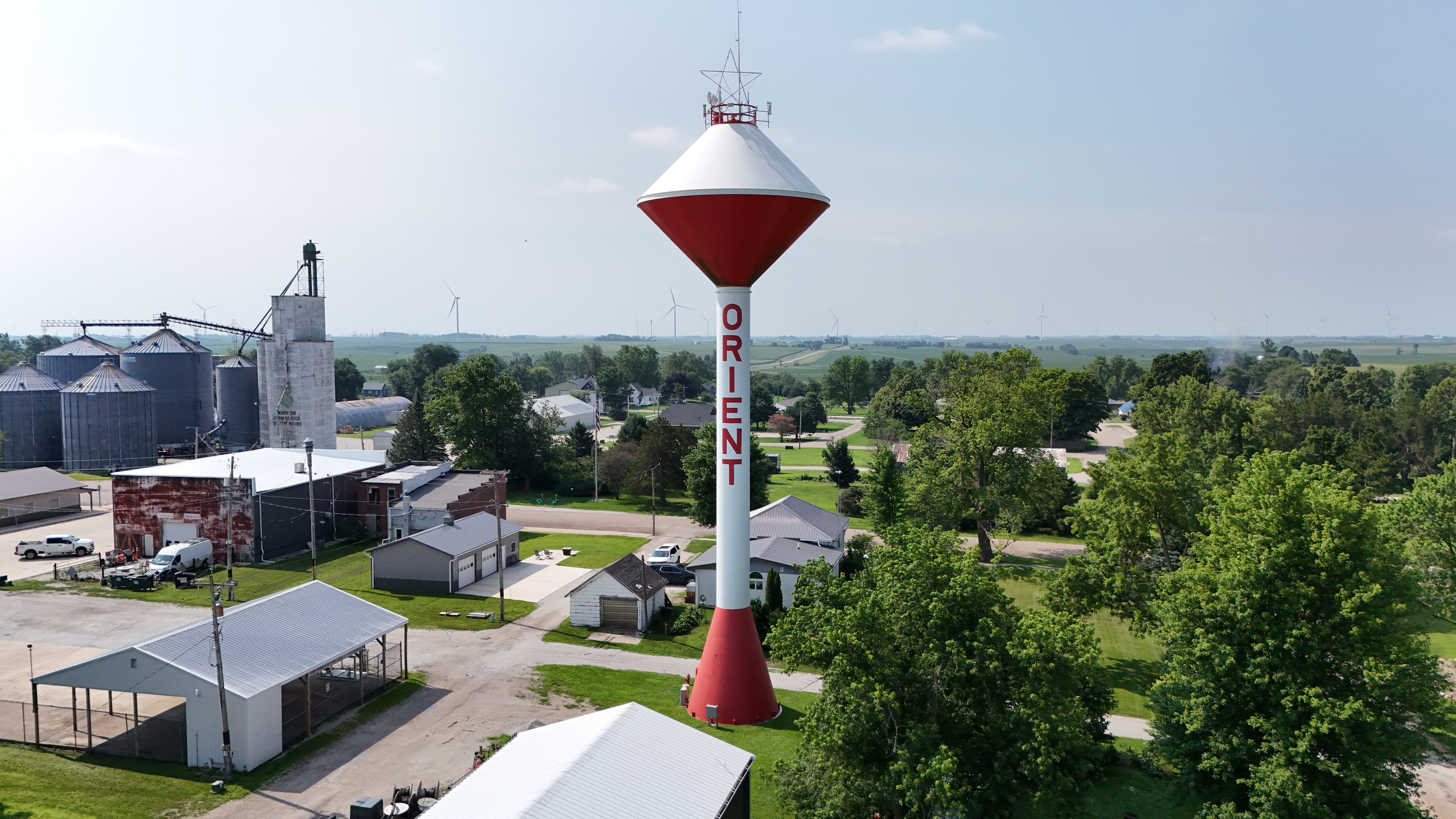
- Orient water tower, with a wind farm in the background

- Location of Orient, Iowa
- Coordinates: 41°12′12″N 94°25′02″W
- Country: United States
- State: Iowa
- County: Adair
- Township: Orient
- Established: 1879
- Incorporated: March 21, 1882

Government
  - Type: Council
  - Mayor: Matthew D. Swanson

Area
  - Total: 0.44 sq mi (1.13 km^{2})
  - Land: 0.44 sq mi (1.13 km^{2})
  - Water: 0 sq mi (0.00 km^{2})
- Elevation: 1,352 ft (412 m)

Population (2020)
  - Total: 368
  - Density: 845.0/sq mi (326.27/km^{2})
- Time zone: UTC-6 (Central (CST))
  - Summer (DST): UTC-5 (CDT)
- ZIP code: 50858
- Area code: 641
- FIPS code: 19-59565
- GNIS feature ID: 2396078
- Website: www.orientiowa.com

Orient is a city in Orient Township, Adair County, Iowa, United States. The population was 368 at the time of the 2020 census.

== History ==
Orient was incorporated on March 21, 1882, on land set aside by the nearby Chicago, Burlington and Quincy Railroad.

== Geography ==
According to the United States Census Bureau, the city has a total area of 0.45 square miles (1.17 km^{2}), all land.

== Demographics ==
Historical population
Year	Pop.	±%
1880	31	—
1890	130	+319.4%
1900	359	+176.2%
1910	373	+3.9%
1920	500	+34.0%
1930	433	−13.4%
1940	442	+2.1%
1950	427	−3.4%
1960	341	−20.1%
1970	324	−5.0%
1980	416	+28.4%
1990	376	−9.6%
2000	402	+6.9%
2010	408	+1.5%
2020	368	−9.8%
Source:"U.S. Census website". United States Census Bureau. and Iowa Data Center; Source: U.S. Decennial Census

=== 2020 census ===
As of the census of 2020, there were 368 people, 151 households, and 104 families residing in the city. The population density was 845.0 inhabitants per square mile (326.3/km^{2}). There were 174 housing units at an average density of 399.6 per square mile (154.3/km^{2}). The racial makeup of the city was 95.1% White, 0.5% Black or African American, 0.0% Native American, 0.0% Asian, 0.0% Pacific Islander, 0.5% from other races and 3.8% from two or more races. Hispanic or Latino persons of any race comprised 2.4% of the population.

Of the 151 households, 26.5% of which had children under the age of 18 living with them, 53.6% were married couples living together, 7.3% were cohabitating couples, 25.8% had a female householder with no spouse or partner present and 13.2% had a male householder with no spouse or partner present. 31.1% of all households were non-families. 26.5% of all households were made up of individuals, 13.2% had someone living alone who was 65 years old or older.

The median age in the city was 42.8 years. 22.0% of the residents were under the age of 20; 3.8% were between the ages of 20 and 24; 27.4% were from 25 and 44; 28.5% were from 45 and 64; and 18.2% were 65 years of age or older. The gender makeup of the city was 48.6% male and 51.4% female.

=== 2010 census ===
As of the census of 2010, there were 408 people, 169 households, and 118 families living in the city. The population density was 906.7 inhabitants per square mile (350.1/km^{2}). There were 186 housing units at an average density of 413.3 per square mile (159.6/km^{2}). The racial makeup of the city was 98.0% White, 0.2% Native American, 0.2% from other races, and 1.5% from two or more races. Hispanic or Latino of any race were 2.2% of the population.

There were 169 households, of which 32.0% had children under the age of 18 living with them, 58.6% were married couples living together, 8.3% had a female householder with no husband present, 3.0% had a male householder with no wife present, and 30.2% were non-families. 27.2% of all households were made up of individuals, and 14.8% had someone living alone who was 65 years of age or older. The average household size was 2.41 and the average family size was 2.92.

The median age in the city was 40 years. 22.1% of residents were under the age of 18; 7.8% were between the ages of 18 and 24; 25.7% were from 25 to 44; 29% were from 45 to 64; and 15.4% were 65 years of age or older. The gender makeup of the city was 49.8% male and 50.2% female.

=== 2000 census ===
As of the census of 2000, there were 402 people, 167 households, and 111 families living in the city. The population density was 863.4 inhabitants per square mile (333.4/km^{2}). There were 179 housing units at an average density of 384.5 per square mile (148.5/km^{2}). The racial makeup of the city was 98.51% White, 0.25% Native American, and 1.24% from two or more races. Hispanic or Latino of any race were 1.24% of the population.

There were 167 households, out of which 32.3% had children under the age of 18 living with them, 55.1% were married couples living together, 7.8% had a female householder with no husband present, and 33.5% were non-families. 28.7% of all households were made up of individuals, and 19.2% had someone living alone who was 65 years of age or older. The average household size was 2.41 and the average family size was 3.02.

Age spread: 25.6% under the age of 18, 7.7% from 18 to 24, 26.9% from 25 to 44, 20.9% from 45 to 64, and 18.9% who were 65 years of age or older. The median age was 39 years. For every 100 females, there were 103.0 males. For every 100 females age 18 and over, there were 100.7 males.

The median income for a household in the city was $35,750, and the median income for a family was $39,219. Males had a median income of $28,438 versus $21,477 for females. The per capita income for the city was $13,937. About 3.2% of families and 6.5% of the population were below the poverty line, including 5.6% of those under age 18 and 17.3% of those age 65 or over.

== Education ==
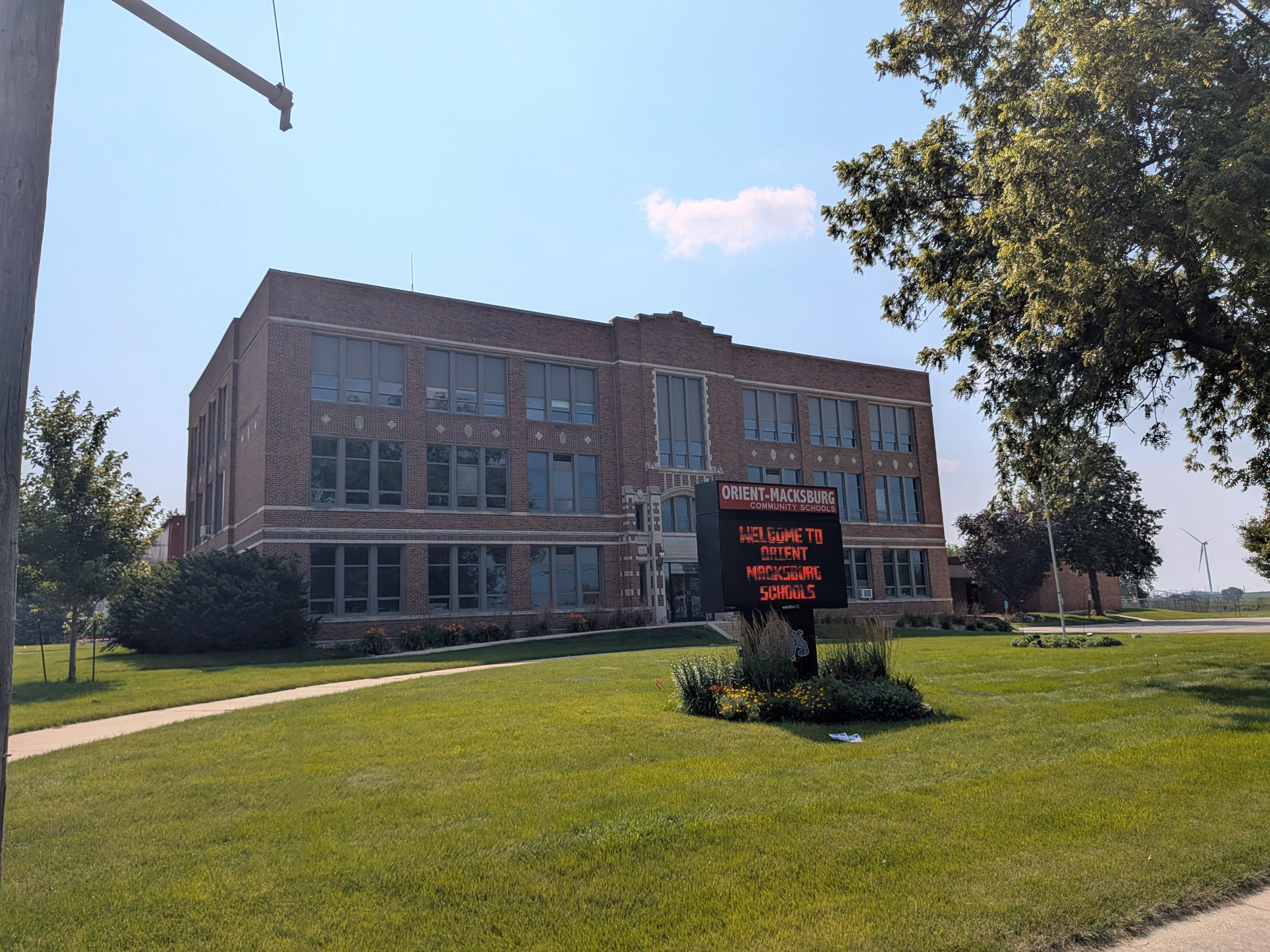
Orient-Macksburg Community School

Orient-Macksburg Community School District formerly operated area public schools. The school formed after the consolidation of the formerly separate Orient and Macksburg school districts in 1960. All students in the district, pre-kindergarten through 12th-grade, are housed in a single school building, located at the southeast corner of School and Division streets and straddling Iowa Highway 25. Many improvements were made to the building through the years, with elementary additions built in 1979 and 1998.

In June 2024, it was announced the school would be closing after the end of the 2024-2025 school year. School officials cited low enrollment, staffing issues, and financial shortfalls. The district began sending students to Nodaway Valley Community School District schools in 2025, and it dissolved completely effective July 1, 2026.

== Notable people ==
- Jack E. Conger (1921–2006), ace pilot awarded the Navy Cross during World War II
- Dazzy Vance (1891–1961), National Baseball Hall of Fame pitcher
- Henry A. Wallace (1888–1985), 33rd vice president under Franklin D. Roosevelt
