= Union Township, Adair County, Iowa =

Township in Iowa, US

Union Township, Adair County
- Township
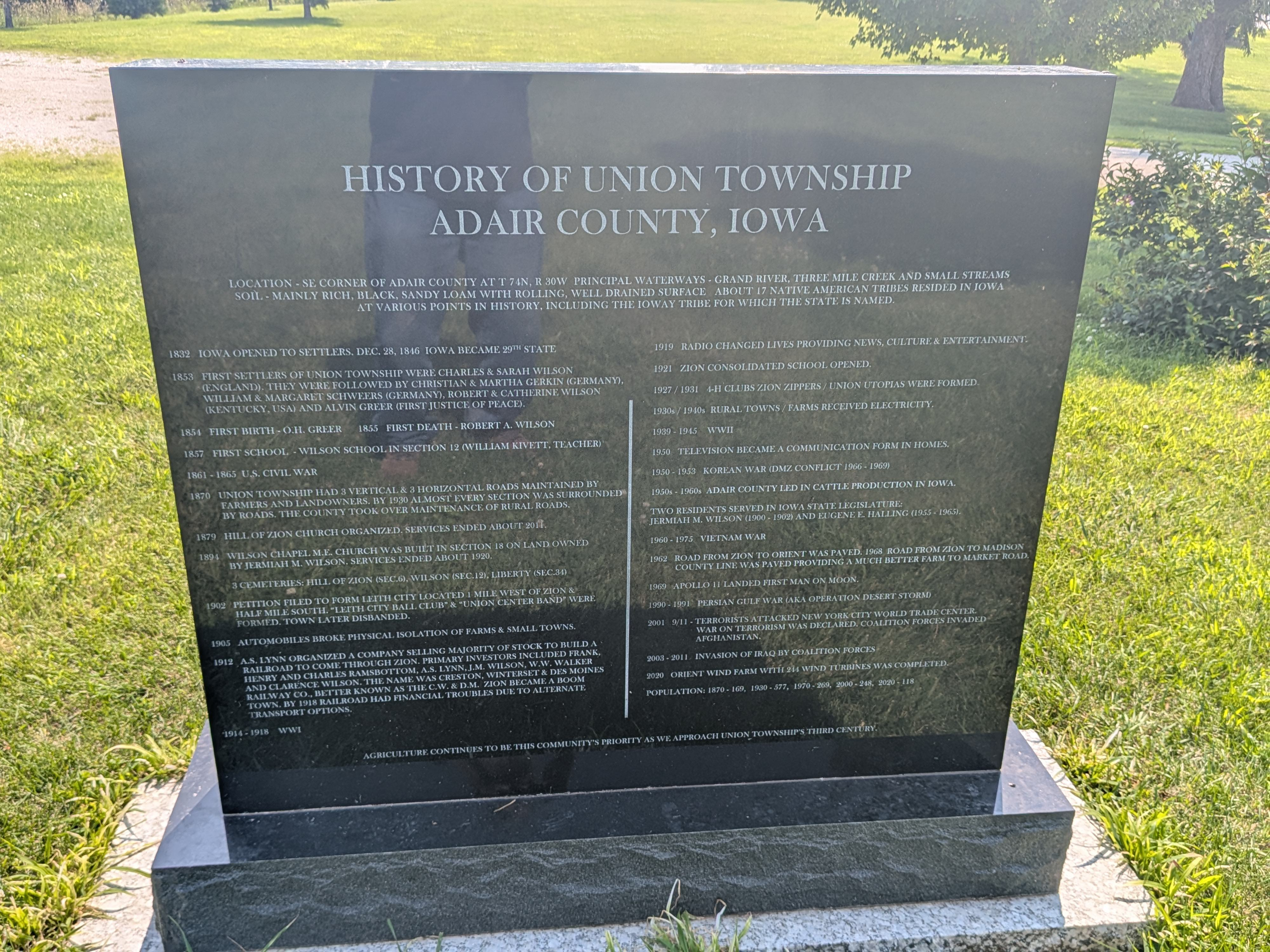
- A marker in Zion, Iowa, that lists important events in Union Township history

- Coordinates: 41°12′02″N 094°17′55″W
- Country: United States
- State: Iowa
- County: Adair

Area
  - Total: 35.89 sq mi (92.95 km^{2})
  - Land: 35.83 sq mi (92.79 km^{2})
  - Water: 0.066 sq mi (0.17 km^{2})
- Elevation: 1,201 ft (366 m)

Population (2010)
  - Total: 177
  - Density: 4.9/sq mi (1.9/km^{2})
- Time zone: UTC-6 (CST)
  - Summer (DST): UTC-5 (CDT)
- FIPS code: 19-94161
- GNIS feature ID: 0468805

Union Township is one of seventeen townships in Adair County, Iowa, USA. At the 2010 census, its population was 177.

== History ==
Union Township was first settled in 1853.

== Geography ==
Union Township covers an area of 35.89 square miles (93.0 km^{2}) and contains no incorporated settlements. According to the USGS, it contains three cemeteries: Hill of Zion, Liberty and Wilson.
