= Orient Township, Adair County, Iowa =

Township in Iowa, US

Orient Township, Adair County
- Township
- Coordinates: 41°12′08″N 094°24′50″W
- Country: United States
- State: Iowa
- County: Adair

Area
  - Total: 35.26 sq mi (91.32 km^{2})
  - Land: 35.20 sq mi (91.17 km^{2})
  - Water: 0.062 sq mi (0.16 km^{2})
- Elevation: 1,352 ft (412 m)

Population (2020)
  - Total: 504
  - Density: 16/sq mi (6.3/km^{2})
- Time zone: UTC-6 (CST)
  - Summer (DST): UTC-5 (CDT)
- FIPS code: 19-93198
- GNIS feature ID: 0468472

Orient Township is one of seventeen townships in Adair County, Iowa, USA. At the 2020 census, its population was 504.

== History ==
Orient Township was organized in 1869.

== Geography ==
Orient Township covers an area of 35.26 square miles (91.3 km^{2}) and contains one incorporated settlement, Orient. According to the USGS, it contains one cemetery, Orient.
