= Richland Township, Adair County, Iowa =

Township in Iowa, US

Richland Township, Adair County
- Township
- Coordinates: 41°11′57″N 094°31′30″W
- Country: United States
- State: Iowa
- County: Adair

Area
  - Total: 35.67 sq mi (92.38 km^{2})
  - Land: 35.64 sq mi (92.31 km^{2})
  - Water: 0.027 sq mi (0.07 km^{2})
- Elevation: 1,270 ft (387 m)

Population (2010)
  - Total: 174
  - Density: 4.9/sq mi (1.9/km^{2})
- Time zone: UTC-6 (CST)
  - Summer (DST): UTC-5 (CDT)
- FIPS code: 19-93570
- GNIS feature ID: 0468598

Richland Township is one of seventeen townships in Adair County, Iowa, USA. At the 2010 census, its population was 174.

== History ==
Richland Township was organized in 1860. A school house had been built beforehand in 1858. Richland Cemetery was built in 1869, followed by the township's post office (named Fisk) in 1870, and Union Church cemetery in 1871.

== Geography ==
Richland Township covers an area of 35.67 square miles (92.4 km^{2}) and contains no incorporated settlements. According to the USGS, it contains three cemeteries: Penn Avenue, Pleasant Grove and Union.
