= Stuart station (Chicago, Rock Island and Pacific Railroad) =

Stuart
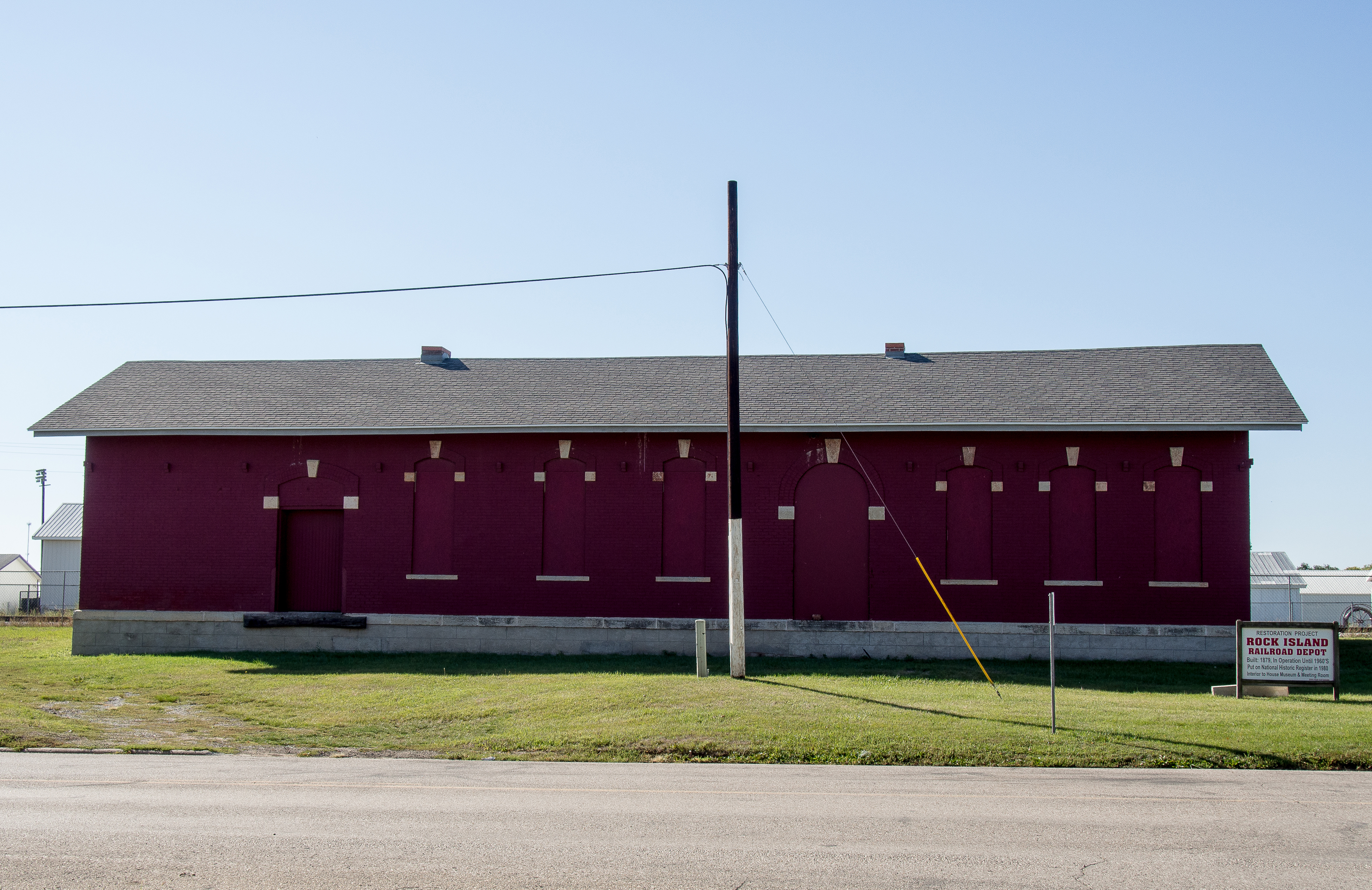
- Stuart station in September 2013.

General information
- Location: White Pole Road, Stuart, Iowa 50520
- System: Former Rock Island Line passenger rail station

History
- Opened: 1869
- Closed: 1965

Services
Preceding station	Chicago, Rock Island and Pacific Railroad	Following station
Menlo toward Colorado Springs	Main Line	Dexter toward Chicago
- Chicago, Rock Island and Pacific Railroad: Stuart Passenger Station
- U.S. National Register of Historic Places
- Location within Iowa Location within the United States
- Location: Front St. Stuart, Iowa
- Coordinates: 41°30′12.5″N 94°19′0.5″W
- Area: less than one acre
- Built: 1868-1869
- NRHP reference No.: 80001428
- Added to NRHP: February 19, 1980
Location

Stuart station is a former train station located in Stuart, Iowa, United States. The town of Stuart was laid out by Charles A. Stuart, for whom it is named, in concert with the Chicago, Rock Island and Pacific Railroad. The railroad reached this point in 1868 and the depot was completed the following year. It is a single story, side gable, frame structure covered with brick veneer. The segmentally-arched widows are capped with brick hoods and limestone keystones. It contains four rooms that housed a baggage room, men's waiting room, ticket office, and the ladies waiting room. This was one of several buildings constructed in Stuart by the Rock Island Line, which placed a divisional headquarters here from the beginning. Other facilities included a roundhouse (1871) and brick shops (1874) that replaced wood-frame structures. In 1897 the railroad moved its facilities to Valley Junction, now West Des Moines.

The station last had passenger service in 1965. In its final years it served only as a limited service stop station between Atlantic to the west and Des Moines to the east, on a local train between Omaha and Chicago.

The depot, which was abandoned by the railroad in 1977, is the only structure that remains in Stuart from its heyday as a railroad town. It was listed on the National Register of Historic Places in 1980.
