= Stuart Township, Guthrie County, Iowa =

Township in Iowa, United States

Coordinates: 41°31′N 94°19′W

Stuart Township is a township in Guthrie County, Iowa, United States.
