= List of people from St. Joseph, Missouri =

This is a list of notable people born in, residents of, or otherwise closely associated with the city of St. Joseph, Missouri.

- Frederick Ahern (1907–1982), production manager
- Don Alt (1916–1988), Iowa state representative and businessman; born in St. Joseph
- Charles S. L. Baker (1859–1926), African American businessman and inventor, lived in St. Joseph.
- Kay Barnes (b. 1938), mayor of Kansas City 1999–2007
- Stephen Nikola Bartulica (b. 1970), Croatian politician, MEP for Croatia (since 2024)
- Dwayne Blakley (b. 1979), football player, born in St. Joseph
- Ryan Bradley (b. 1983), figure skater
- Norbert Brodine, cinematographer
- Byron Browne, baseball player
- Charles Francis Buddy, bishop, attended Christian Brothers School
- Rob Calloway, boxer
- Harold F. Cherniss, historian of ancient Greece and Plato scholar at Princeton
- Keith K. Compton, lieutenant general and key figure in Operation Tidal Wave.
- Orson L. Crandall, naval officer, Navy master diver, Medal of Honor recipient
- Walter Cronkite, iconic television journalist, born in St. Joseph
- Paul Crouch, founder of Trinity Broadcasting Network
- Katherine Kennicott Davis, composer of "The Little Drummer Boy"
- W. True Davis Jr., U.S. Ambassador to Switzerland
- Eminem, rapper and songwriter, born in St. Joseph
- Eugene Field, popular poet in his day, worked for the St. Joseph Gazette
- Harold K. Forsen, nuclear physicist
- Ralph D. Foster, broadcasting pioneer
- Betty Garrett, actress, born in St. Joseph
- Elijah Gates, state treasurer of Missouri
- Anthony Glise, guitarist
- Jody Hamilton, wrestler
- Larry Hamilton, wrestler
- Fred Harman, artist, born in St. Joseph
- Coleman Hawkins, jazz saxophonist
- Richard Heinberg, enviormentalist
- Shere Hite, sex educator
- Edie Huggins, television journalist
- Bela M. Hughes (1817–1903), pioneer, prominent St. Joseph lawyer
- William Hyde (1836–1898), journalist
- Lucie Fulton Isaacs, writer, philanthropist, suffragist
- Jesse James, iconic outlaw, murdered in St. Joseph
- Kagney Linn Karter, porn actress
- Henry Krug, founded Krug Packing Company, gave Krug Park to the City
- Brian McDonald, writer
- Louise Davis McMahon (1873–1966), philanthropist
- Jeff Morris, actor, born in St. Joseph
- Joseph Morton Only known Allied war correspondent to have been executed during World War II
- Timothy Omundson, actor
- Mary Alicia Owen, Missouri folklorist
- Isaac Parker, judge
- Travis Partridge, football player
- Forrest E. Peden, decorated World War II soldier
- Benjamin F. Peery, physicist, astronomer and professor
- Tom Pendergast, political boss
- Seraphine Eppstein Pisko, executive secretary of the Denver Jewish Hospital
- Frank Posegate, mayor of St. Joseph
- LeRoy Prinz, choreographer and film director
- Arthur Pryor, trombonist
- Randy Railsback, member of the Missouri House of Representatives
- Sid Rogell, Hollywood producer
- Nellie Tayloe Ross, first woman elected governor of a U.S. state - Wyoming
- Martin Rucker, football player
- Martin T. Rucker, politician
- Mike Rucker, football player
- Jay Sarno, hotel mogul, founder of Caesars Palace
- Bill Snyder, Kansas State football coach
- Eddie Timanus, Jeopardy! champion, won five times in 1999 despite being blind
- Steve Walsh, musician of band Kansas
- Ruth Warrick, actress, known for Citizen Kane and All My Children
- James H. Webb, U.S. senator from Virginia, born in St. Joseph
- Ed Wiskoski, Professional wrestler
- Silas Woodson (1819–1896), 21st governor of Missouri, prominent St. Joseph lawyer
- Huston Wyeth, industrialist
- Jane Wyman, Oscar–winning actress and first wife of Ronald Reagan, born in St. Joseph
- Delmer J. Yoakum (1915–1996), artist
- Olive Young, born in St. Joseph; actress and blues singer
