= Buchanan County, Missouri =

County in Missouri, United States

- County
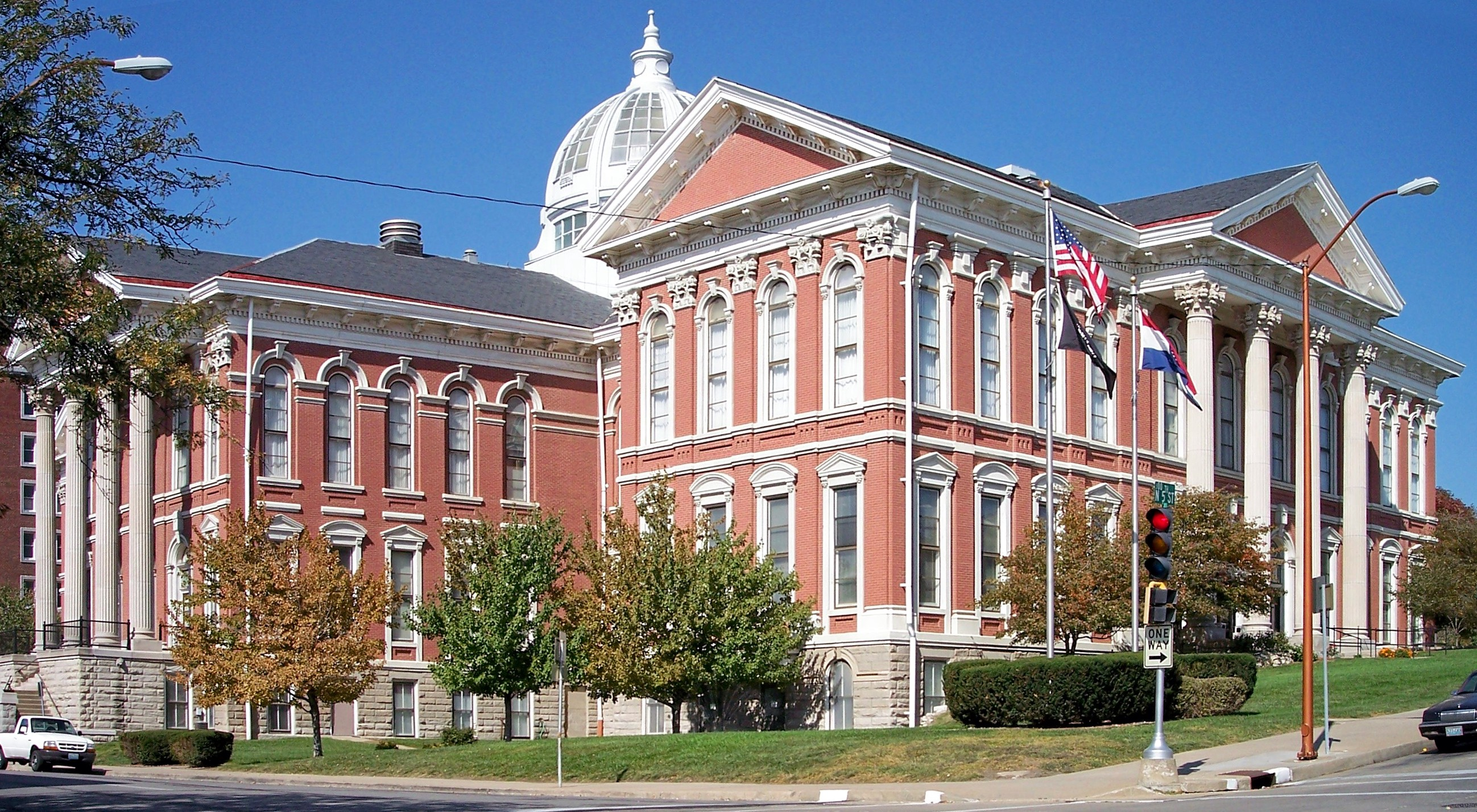
- The Buchanan County Courthouse in downtown St. Joseph

- Location within the U.S. state of Missouri
- Coordinates: 39°40′N 94°49′W
- Country: United States
- State: Missouri
- Founded: December 31, 1838
- Named for: James Buchanan
- Seat: St. Joseph
- Largest city: St. Joseph

Area
  - Total: 415 sq mi (1,070 km^{2})
  - Land: 408 sq mi (1,060 km^{2})
  - Water: 6.6 sq mi (17 km^{2}) 1.6%

Population (2020)
  - Total: 84,793
  - Estimate (2025): 83,540 ▼
  - Density: 200/sq mi (77/km^{2})
- Time zone: UTC−6 (Central)
  - Summer (DST): UTC−5 (CDT)
- Congressional district: 6th
- Website: www.co.buchanan.mo.us

Buchanan County (/bjuːˈkænən/ bew-KAN-ən) is located in the U.S. state of Missouri. As of the 2020 United States census, the population was 84,793. Its county seat is St. Joseph. When originally formed in 1838, the county was named Roberts County, after settler Hiram Roberts. It was renamed in 1839 for James Buchanan, then a U.S. Senator and later President of the United States. The county was formed from land annexed to Missouri, as were five other counties. Buchanan County is included in the Kansas City CSA.

== Geography ==
According to the U.S. Census Bureau, the county has a total area of 415 square miles (1,070 km^{2}), of which 408 square miles (1,060 km^{2}) is land and 6.6 square miles (17 km^{2}) (1.6%) is water.

=== Adjacent counties ===
- Andrew County (north)
- DeKalb County (northeast)
- Clinton County (east)
- Platte County (south)
- Atchison County, Kansas (southwest)
- Doniphan County, Kansas (northwest)

== Transportation ==
=== Major highways ===
- Interstate 29
- Interstate 29 Business
- Interstate 229
- U.S. Route 36
- U.S. Route 59
- U.S. Route 71
- US 71 Business
- U.S. Route 169
- Route 6
- Route 31
- Route 45
- Route 116
- Route 138
- Route 273
- Route 371
- Route 752
- Route 759

=== Transit ===
- St. Joseph Transit
- Jefferson Lines

== Demographics ==
Historical population
Census	Pop.	Note	%±
1840	6,237		—
1850	12,975		108.0%
1860	23,861		83.9%
1870	35,109		47.1%
1880	49,792		41.8%
1890	70,100		40.8%
1900	121,838		73.8%
1910	93,020		−23.7%
1920	93,684		0.7%
1930	98,633		5.3%
1940	94,067		−4.6%
1950	96,826		2.9%
1960	90,581		−6.4%
1970	86,915		−4.0%
1980	87,888		1.1%
1990	83,083		−5.5%
2000	85,998		3.5%
2010	89,201		3.7%
2020	84,793		−4.9%
2025 (est.)	83,540	▼	−1.5%
U.S. Decennial Census; 1790-1960 1900-1990; 1990-2000 2010-2015

=== 2020 census ===
Buchanan County, Missouri – Racial and ethnic composition Note: the US Census treats Hispanic/Latino as an ethnic category. This table excludes Latinos from the racial categories and assigns them to a separate category. Hispanics/Latinos may be of any race.
Race / Ethnicity (NH = Non-Hispanic)	Pop 1980	Pop 1990	Pop 2000	Pop 2010	Pop 2020	% 1980	% 1990	% 2000	% 2010	% 2020
White alone (NH)	83,286	78,233	78,406	76,937	68,391	94.76%	94.16%	91.17%	86.25%	80.66%
Black or African American alone (NH)	2,593	2,615	3,714	4,572	4,303	2.95%	3.15%	4.32%	5.13%	5.07%
Native American or Alaska Native alone (NH)	220	233	321	327	323	0.25%	0.28%	0.37%	0.37%	0.38%
Asian alone (NH)	174	252	384	704	1,048	0.20%	0.30%	0.45%	0.79%	1.24%
Native Hawaiian or Pacific Islander alone (NH)	x	x	20	149	426	x	x	0.02%	0.17%	0.50%
Other race alone (NH)	67	41	53	73	237	0.08%	0.05%	0.06%	0.08%	0.28%
Mixed race or Multiracial (NH)	x	x	1,014	1,765	4,465	x	x	1.18%	1.98%	5.27%
Hispanic or Latino (any race)	1,548	1,709	2,086	4,674	5,600	1.76%	2.06%	2.43%	5.24%	6.60%
Total	87,888	83,083	85,998	89,201	84,793	100.00%	100.00%	100.00%	100.00%	100.00%

As of the 2020 census, the county had a population of 84,793, the median age was 39.1 years, 22.0% of residents were under the age of 18, and 17.5% of residents were 65 years of age or older. For every 100 females there were 100.6 males, and for every 100 females age 18 and over there were 98.7 males age 18 and over. 86.3% of residents lived in urban areas, while 13.7% lived in rural areas.

The racial makeup of the county was 82.6% White, 5.2% Black or African American, 0.5% American Indian and Alaska Native, 1.3% Asian, 0.5% Native Hawaiian and Pacific Islander, 2.3% from some other race, and 7.6% from two or more races. Hispanic or Latino residents of any race comprised 6.6% of the population.

There were 33,882 households in the county, of which 28.3% had children under the age of 18 living with them and 28.9% had a female householder with no spouse or partner present. About 31.7% of all households were made up of individuals and 13.5% had someone living alone who was 65 years of age or older.

There were 38,258 housing units, of which 11.4% were vacant. Among occupied housing units, 63.1% were owner-occupied and 36.9% were renter-occupied. The homeowner vacancy rate was 2.2% and the rental vacancy rate was 12.7%.

=== 2000 census ===
As of the census of 2000, there were 85,998 people, 33,557 households, and 21,912 families residing in the county. The population density was 210 inhabitants per square mile (81/km^{2}). There were 36,574 housing units at an average density of 89 units per square mile (34/km^{2}). The racial makeup of the county was 92.73% White, 4.36% Black or African American, 0.42% Native American, 0.45% Asian, 0.02% Pacific Islander, 0.65% from other races, and 1.37% from two or more races. Approximately 2.43% of the population were Hispanic or Latino of any race.

There were 33,557 households, out of which 30.60% had children under the age of 18 living with them, 49.30% were married couples living together, 12.00% had a female householder with no husband present, and 34.70% were non-families. 28.90% of all households were made up of individuals, and 12.50% had someone living alone who was 65 years of age or older. The average household size was 2.42 and the average family size was 2.98.

In the county, the population was spread out, with 24.30% under the age of 18, 11.00% from 18 to 24, 28.50% from 25 to 44, 21.20% from 45 to 64, and 15.00% who were 65 years of age or older. The median age was 36 years. For every 100 females, there were 96.70 males. For every 100 females age 18 and over, there were 93.90 males.

The median income for a household in the county was $34,704, and the median income for a family was $42,408. Males had a median income of $31,697 versus $21,827 for females. The per capita income for the county was $17,882. About 8.50% of families and 12.20% of the population were below the poverty line, including 15.00% of those under age 18 and 9.60% of those age 65 or over.

=== Religion ===
According to the Association of Religion Data Archives County Membership Report (2010), Buchanan County is sometimes regarded as being on the northern edge of the Bible Belt, with evangelical Protestantism being the most predominant religion. The most predominant denominations among residents in Buchanan County who adhere to a religion are Southern Baptists (24.96%), Roman Catholics (20.35%), and nondenominational evangelical groups (15.95%).

== Education ==
School districts include:

- Buchanan County R-IV School District
- East Buchanan County C-1 School District
- Mid-Buchanan County R-V School District
- St. Joseph School District
- North Platte County R-I School District

=== Public schools ===
Four school districts operate schools in the county boundaries:

- Buchanan County R-IV School District – De Kalb
  - Rushville Elementary School (PK-06)
  - De Kalb Junior/Senior High School (07-12)
- East Buchanan County C-I School District - Gower
  - East Buchanan County C-I Middle School (06-08) - Easton
- Mid-Buchanan County R-V School District – Faucett
  - Mid-Buchanan County Elementary School (PK-06)
  - Mid-Buchanan County High School (07-12)
- St. Joseph School District – St. Joseph
  - Carden Park Elementary School (K-05)
  - Coleman Elementary School (K-05)
  - Edison Elementary School (PK-05)
  - Ellison Elementary School (K-05)
  - Field Elementary School (K-05)
  - Hosea Elementary School (PK-05)
  - Hyde Elementary School (K-05)
  - Lindbergh Elementary School (PK-05)
  - Oak Grove Elementary School (K-05)
  - Parkway Elementary School (PK-05)
  - Pickett Elementary School (PK-05)
  - Skaith Elementary School (PK-05)
  - Bode Middle School (06-08)
  - Lafayette Middle School (06-08)
  - Spring Garden Middle (06-08)
  - Truman Middle School (06-08)
  - Benton High School (09-12)
  - Central High School (09-12)

=== Private schools ===
- Baptist Temple Schools – St. Joseph (K-12) – Baptist
- Bishop LeBlond High School – St. Joseph (9-12) – Roman Catholic
- Cathedral School & Early Childhood Center – St. Joseph (NS/PK-08) – Roman Catholic
- Prescott Seventh-day Adventist School – St. Joseph (02-08) – Seventh-day Adventist
- South Park Christian Academy – St. Joseph (K-12) – Pentecostal
- St. Francis Xavier School – St. Joseph (K-09) – Roman Catholic
- St. James School – St. Joseph (K-09) – Roman Catholic
- St. Joseph Christian School – St. Joseph (PK-12) – Nondenominational Christian
- St. Joseph KinderCare – St. Joseph (NS-PK)
- St. Paul Lutheran School – St. Joseph (K-09) – Lutheran

=== Colleges and Universities ===
- Missouri Western State University

=== Public libraries ===
- Rolling Hills Consolidated Library—Belt Branch
- Saint Joseph Public Library

== Communities ==
=== Cities ===
- Dearborn (partly in Platte County)
- De Kalb
- Easton
- Gower (partly in Clinton County)
- St. Joseph (county seat)

=== Villages ===
- Agency
- Lewis and Clark Village
- Rushville

=== Census-designated place ===
- Faucett

=== Unincorporated communities ===
- Frazier
- Halls
- San Antonio
- Sparta
- Wallace
- Willow Brook
- Winthrop

=== Extinct hamlets ===
- Garrettsburg
- Halleck
- Kenmoor
- Pinkston
- Saxton

=== Townships ===
Buchanan County is divided into 12 townships:

- Agency
- Bloomington
- Center
- Crawford
- Jackson
- Lake
- Marion
- Platte
- Rush
- Tremont
- Washington
- Wayne

=== Population ranking ===
The population ranking of the following table is based on the 2020 census of Buchanan County.

† County seat
†† Partly within an adjacent county

Rank	Name	Municipal Type	Population
1	St. Joseph †	Home Rule City	72,473
2	Gower††	4th Class City	1,533
3	Agency	Village	671
4	Dearborn††	4th Class City	482
5	Faucett	CDP	248
6	De Kalb	4th Class City	233
7	Easton	4th Class City	227
8	Rushville	Village	225
9	Lewis and Clark Village	Village	96

== Notable people ==
- Charles S. L. Baker, African American businessman and inventor
- Kay Barnes, Mayor of Kansas City, Missouri (1999–2007)
- Dwayne Blakley, professional football player
- Ryan Bradley, figure skater
- Norbert Brodine, cinematographer
- Byron Browne, professional baseball player
- Charles F. Buddy, bishop, attended Christian Brothers School
- Rob Calloway, boxer
- Harold F. Cherniss, historian of ancient Greece and Plato scholar at Princeton
- Walter Cronkite, iconic television journalist
- Paul Crouch, founder of Trinity Broadcasting Network
- Katherine Kennicott Davis, composer of "The Little Drummer Boy"
- Eminem, rapper and recording artist
- Eugene Field, popular poet in his day, worked for the St. Joseph Gazette and wrote a famous poem about Lover's Lane in St. Joseph
- Ralph D. Foster, broadcasting pioneer
- Betty Garrett, actress, known for On the Town and Laverne & Shirley
- Elijah Gates, State Treasurer of Missouri (1877–1881)
- Anthony Glise, guitarist
- Jody Hamilton, wrestler
- Larry Hamilton, wrestler
- Fred Harman, artist, drew the Red Ryder cartoons and worked with Walt Disney
- Coleman Hawkins, jazz saxophonist
- Shere Hite, sex educator
- Edie Huggins, television journalist
- Bela M. Hughes, pioneer, prominent St. Joseph lawyer in 1850s and 1860s
- William Hyde, journalist
- Henry Iba, Oklahoma State University men's basketball coach
- Jesse James, iconic outlaw, murdered in St. Joseph
- Kagney Linn Karter, pornographic actress
- Brian McDonald, writer
- Jeff Morris, actor, known for The Blues Brothers
- Timothy Omundson, actor
- Isaac C. Parker, federal judge, U.S. Representative from Missouri (1871–1875)
- Travis Partridge, professional football player
- Forrest E. Peden, decorated World War II soldier
- Tom Pendergast, political boss
- Seraphine Eppstein Pisko, executive secretary of the Denver Jewish Hospital
- Frank Posegate, mayor of St. Joseph
- LeRoy Prinz, choreographer and film director
- Arthur Pryor, trombonist
- Sid Rogell, Hollywood producer
- Nellie Tayloe Ross, first woman elected governor of a U.S. state; Governor of Wyoming (1925–1927)
- Martin Rucker, professional football player
- Mike Rucker, professional football player
- Jay Sarno, hotel mogul, founder of Caesars Palace
- Bill Snyder, Kansas State football coach
- Evalyn Thomas, drama and English instructor at UCLA, 1917–1938
- Eddie Timanus, Jeopardy! champion, won five times in 1999 despite being blind
- Steve Walsh, musician of band Kansas
- Ruth Warrick, actress, known for Citizen Kane and All My Children
- Jim Webb, U.S. Senator from Virginia (2007–2013)
- Silas Woodson, 21st Governor of Missouri (1873–1875)
- Huston Wyeth, industrialist
- Jane Wyman, Oscar–winning actress and first wife of Ronald Reagan
- Delmer J. Yoakum, artist
- Olive Young, actress and blues singer

== Politics ==
=== Local ===
The Republican Party predominantly controls politics at the local level in Buchanan County. Republicans hold all but two of the elected positions in the county.

Buchanan County, Missouri

Elected countywide officials
Assessor	Dean Wilson	Republican
Auditor	Tara Horn	Republican
Circuit Clerk	Ashley Thrasher	Republican
County Clerk	Mary Baack-Garvey	Republican
Collector	Peggy Campbell	Democratic
Commissioner (presiding)	Scott Nelson	Republican
Commissioner (eastern district)	Scott Burnham	Republican
Commissioner (western district)	Ron Hook	Democratic
Prosecuting Attorney	Michelle Davidson	Republican
Public Administrator	Brad Haggard	Republican
Recorder	Becky Dunlap	Republican
Sheriff	Bill Puett	Republican
Treasurer	David Gall	Republican

=== State ===
Past Gubernatorial Elections Results
Year	Republican	Democratic	Third Parties
2024	63.81% 22,432	33.62% 11,819	2.57% 903
2020	60.85% 22,147	36.34% 13,225	2.81% 1,022
2016	52.60% 18,714	43.92% 15,628	3.48% 1,238
2012	39.61% 13,810	56.46% 19,685	3.92% 1,368
2008	37.39% 14,442	59.94% 23,151	2.67% 1,028
2004	50.03% 18,967	48.31% 18,317	1.66% 629
2000	45.18% 15,602	52.12% 17,998	2.70% 930
1996	29.76% 9,731	67.41% 22,045	2.83% 925

Buchanan County is split between three legislative districts in the Missouri House of Representatives, all of which are held by Republicans.

- District 10 – Bill Falkner (R-St. Joseph). The district is entirely based in the city of St. Joseph.

Missouri House of Representatives - District 10 – Buchanan County (2024)
Party	Candidate	Votes	%	±%
Republican	Bill Falkner	8,154	61.03%	−38.05
Democratic	Andrew Gibson	5,009	38.05%	+38.05

Missouri House of Representatives - District 10 – Buchanan County (2022)
Party	Candidate	Votes	%	±%
Republican	Bill Falkner	7,271	100%	+38.97

Missouri House of Representatives - District 10 – Buchanan County (2020)
Party	Candidate	Votes	%	±%
Republican	Bill Falkner	7,110	61.03%	+2.89
Democratic	Colby Murphy	4,541	38.98%	−2.89

Missouri House of Representatives — District 10 — Buchanan County (2018)
Party	Candidate	Votes	%	±%
Republican	Bill Falkner	5,753	58.13%	
Democratic	Shane R. Thompson	4,144	41.87%	

- District 11 – Brenda Shields (R-St. Joseph). Consists of the southern part of the county.

Missouri House of Representatives — District 11 — Buchanan County (2024)
Party	Candidate	Votes	%	±%
Republican	Brenda Shields	14,119	100%	

Missouri House of Representatives — District 11 — Buchanan County (2022)
Party	Candidate	Votes	%	±%
Republican	Brenda Shields	9,944	100%	+29.71

Missouri House of Representatives — District 11 — Buchanan County (2020)
Party	Candidate	Votes	%	±%
Republican	Brenda Shields	9,737	70.29%	+5.42
Democratic	Brady Lee O'Dell	4,115	29.71%	−5.42

Missouri House of Representatives — District 11 — Buchanan County (2018)
Party	Candidate	Votes	%	±%
Republican	Brenda Shields	7,275	64.87%	−35.13
Democratic	Brady Lee O'Dell	3,940	35.13%	+35.13

- District 13 – Sean Pouche (R-Kansas City). Consists of some of the eastern parts of the county.

Missouri House of Representatives — District 11 — Buchanan County (2024)
Party	Candidate	Votes	%	±%
Republican	Sean Pouche	3,898	73.13%	−23.87
Democratic	Andrea Denning	1,222	23.87%	+23.87

Missouri House of Representatives — District 11 — Buchanan County (2022)
Party	Candidate	Votes	%	±%
Republican	Sean Pouche	3,082	100%	

All of Buchanan County is a part of Missouri's 34th District in the Missouri Senate and is currently represented by Tony Luetkemeyer (R-Parkville).

Missouri Senate - District 34 – Buchanan County (2022)
Party	Candidate	Votes	%	±%
Republican	Tony Luetkemeyer	14,733	53.34%	+13.20
Democratic	Sarah Shorter	7,411	33.47%	−13.20

Missouri Senate - District 34 – Buchanan County (2018)
Party	Candidate	Votes	%	±%
Republican	Tony Luetkemeyer	15,903	53.34%	−0.35
Democratic	Martin T. Rucker II	13,913	46.66%	+0.35

=== Federal ===
All of Buchanan County is included in Missouri's 6th Congressional District and is currently represented by Sam Graves (R-Tarkio) in the U.S. House of Representatives. Graves was elected to a thirteenth term in 2024 over Democratic challenger Pam May.

U.S. House of Representatives – Missouri’s 6th Congressional District – Buchanan County (2024)
Party	Candidate	Votes	%	±%
Republican	Sam Graves	23,131	65.70%	+0.73
Democratic	Pam May	11,186	31.77%	−0.59
Libertarian	Andy Maidment	579	1.64%	−1.02
Green	Mike Diel	309	0.88%	+0.88

U.S. House of Representatives – Missouri’s 6th Congressional District – Buchanan County (2022)
Party	Candidate	Votes	%	±%
Republican	Sam Graves	15,955	64.98%	−0.02
Democratic	Henry Martin	7,946	32.36%	+0.14
Libertarian	Edward (Andy) Maidment	1,008	2.66%	−0.13

U.S. House of Representatives – Missouri’s 6th Congressional District – Buchanan County (2020)
Party	Candidate	Votes	%	±%
Republican	Sam Graves	23,523	65.00%	+3.33
Democratic	Gena L. Ross	11,659	32.22%	−2.58
Libertarian	Jim Higgins	1,008	2.79%	−0.75

U.S. House of Representatives – Missouri's 6th Congressional District – Buchanan County (2018)
Party	Candidate	Votes	%	±%
Republican	Sam Graves	18,471	61.67%	−2.59
Democratic	Henry Robert Martin	10,422	34.80%	+2.97
Libertarian	Dan Hogan	1,060	3.54%	+1.04

Buchanan County, along with the rest of the state of Missouri, is represented in the U.S. Senate by Josh Hawley (R-Columbia) and Eric Schmitt (R-Bridgeton).

Hawley was elected to a second term in 2024 over U.S. Marine veteran Lucas Kunce.

U.S. Senate – Class I – Buchanan County (2024)
Party	Candidate	Votes	%	±%
Republican	Josh Hawley	21,451	60.61%	+7.78
Democratic	Lucas Kunce	13,017	36.78%	−6.02
Libertarian	W. C. Young	519	1.31%	−0.41
Green	Nathan Kline	250	0.71%	+0.11
Better Party (Missouri)	Jared Young	210	0.59%	+0.59

Schmitt was elected to a first term in the 2022 over Democrat Trudy Bush Valentine.

U.S. Senate — Class III — Buchanan County (2022)
Party	Candidate	Votes	%	±%
Republican	Eric Schmitt	14,828	60.35%	+10.75
Democratic	Trudy Busch Valentine	8,884	36.16%	−9.07
Libertarian	Jonathan Dine	574	2.34%	−0.59
Constitution	Paul Venable	283	1.15%	+0.36
Write-in	Write-in Canidates	1	0.01%	+0.01

==== Political culture ====
United States presidential election results for Buchanan County, Missouri
Year	Republican		Democratic		Third party(ies)	
Year	No.	%	No.	%	No.	%
1888	5,011	43.20%	6,369	54.91%	219	1.89%
1892	5,522	42.90%	6,949	53.99%	401	3.12%
1896	6,854	47.81%	7,336	51.17%	147	1.03%
1900	8,329	47.51%	8,925	50.91%	278	1.59%
1904	8,703	51.62%	7,736	45.89%	420	2.49%
1908	8,394	45.34%	9,836	53.13%	283	1.53%
1912	4,412	26.46%	8,869	53.18%	3,395	20.36%
1916	7,761	40.56%	10,973	57.35%	400	2.09%
1920	17,191	50.99%	16,188	48.02%	335	0.99%
1924	17,509	50.13%	14,759	42.26%	2,658	7.61%
1928	20,459	62.71%	12,110	37.12%	55	0.17%
1932	14,602	35.68%	26,060	63.68%	260	0.64%
1936	15,912	35.41%	28,825	64.15%	196	0.44%
1940	17,484	41.63%	24,482	58.30%	29	0.07%
1944	15,113	42.91%	20,091	57.04%	20	0.06%
1948	13,002	36.08%	22,975	63.76%	57	0.16%
1952	22,087	52.61%	19,854	47.29%	44	0.10%
1956	20,311	52.49%	18,384	47.51%	0	0.00%
1960	21,448	52.57%	19,348	47.43%	0	0.00%
1964	11,501	32.25%	24,164	67.75%	0	0.00%
1968	16,101	46.38%	15,860	45.69%	2,752	7.93%
1972	21,850	65.72%	11,395	34.28%	0	0.00%
1976	16,446	48.19%	17,427	51.07%	251	0.74%
1980	16,551	47.09%	16,967	48.27%	1,632	4.64%
1984	19,735	56.22%	15,369	43.78%	0	0.00%
1988	15,336	44.99%	18,601	54.57%	152	0.45%
1992	11,275	30.18%	16,570	44.35%	9,520	25.48%
1996	12,610	38.19%	15,848	48.00%	4,560	13.81%
2000	16,423	47.26%	17,085	49.16%	1,243	3.58%
2004	19,812	52.21%	17,799	46.90%	339	0.89%
2008	19,110	48.68%	19,164	48.81%	986	2.51%
2012	18,660	53.15%	15,594	44.42%	852	2.43%
2016	21,320	59.28%	12,013	33.40%	2,631	7.32%
2020	22,450	61.34%	13,445	36.74%	703	1.92%
2024	22,606	63.25%	12,598	35.25%	539	1.51%

At the presidential level, Buchanan County was a swing county that has become increasingly Republican in recent years. Buchanan County strongly favored Republican Donald Trump in 2016, 2020, and 2024. Barack Obama was the last Democratic presidential nominee to carry Buchanan County in 2008 with a plurality of the vote, but a Democrat hasn't won majority support from the county's voters in a presidential election since Michael Dukakis in 1988.

Buchanan County did vote to legalize abortion in Missouri, voting for 2024 Missouri Amendment 3.

=== Missouri presidential preference primaries ===
==== 2020 ====
The 2020 presidential primaries for both the Democratic and Republican parties were held in Missouri on March 10. On the Democratic side, former Vice President Joe Biden (D-Delaware) both won statewide and carried Buchanan County by a wide margin. Biden went on to defeat President Donald Trump in the general election.

Missouri Democratic Presidential Primary – Buchanan County (2020)
Party	Candidate	Votes	%	±%
Democratic	Joe Biden	4,322	57.99	
Democratic	Bernie Sanders	2,645	35.49	
Democratic	Tulsi Gabbard	81	1.09	
Democratic	Others/Uncommitted	405	5.43	

Incumbent President Donald Trump (R-Florida) faced a primary challenge from former Massachusetts Governor Bill Weld, but won both Buchanan County and statewide by overwhelming margins.

Missouri Republican Presidential Primary – Buchanan County (2020)
Party	Candidate	Votes	%	±%
Republican	Donald Trump	3,528	96.24	
Republican	Bill Weld	23	0.63	
Republican	Others/Uncommitted	115	3.14	

==== 2016 ====
The 2016 presidential primaries for both the Republican and Democratic parties were held in Missouri on March 15. Businessman Donald Trump (R-New York) narrowly won the state overall and carried a plurality in Buchanan County. He went on to win the presidency.

Missouri Republican Presidential Primary – Buchanan County (2016)
Party	Candidate	Votes	%	±%
Republican	Donald Trump	4,691	41.65	
Republican	Ted Cruz	3,879	34.44	
Republican	John Kasich	1,478	13.12	
Republican	Marco Rubio	847	7.52	
Republican	Others/Uncommitted	369	3.28	

On the Democratic side, former Secretary of State Hillary Clinton (D-New York) narrowly won statewide, but Senator Bernie Sanders (I-Vermont) carried Buchanan County.

Missouri Democratic Presidential Primary – Buchanan County (2016)
Party	Candidate	Votes	%	±%
Democratic	Bernie Sanders	4,148	53.65	
Democratic	Hillary Clinton	3,443	44.54	
Democratic	Others/Uncommitted	140	1.81	

==== 2012 ====
The 2012 Missouri Republican Presidential Primary's results were nonbinding on the state's national convention delegates. Voters in Buchanan County supported former U.S. Senator Rick Santorum (R-Pennsylvania), who finished first in the state at large, but eventually lost the nomination to former Governor Mitt Romney (R-Massachusetts). Delegates to the congressional district and state conventions were chosen at a county caucus, which selected a delegation favoring Romney. Incumbent President Barack Obama easily won the Missouri Democratic Primary and renomination. He defeated Romney in the general election.

==== 2008 ====
In 2008, the Missouri Republican Presidential Primary was closely contested, with Senator John McCain (R-Arizona) prevailing and eventually winning the nomination. However, former Governor Mitt Romney (R-Massachusetts) narrowly carried Buchanan County.

Missouri Republican Presidential Primary – Buchanan County (2008)
Party	Candidate	Votes	%	±%
Republican	Mitt Romney	2,216	31.94	
Republican	John McCain	2,194	31.63	
Republican	Mike Huckabee	1,825	26.31	
Republican	Ron Paul	521	7.51	
Republican	Others/Uncommitted	181	2.60	

Then-Senator Hillary Clinton (D-New York) received more votes than any candidate from either party in Buchanan County during the 2008 presidential primary. Despite initial reports that Clinton had won Missouri, Barack Obama (D-Illinois), also a Senator at the time, narrowly defeated her statewide and later became that year's Democratic nominee, going on to win the presidency.

Missouri Democratic Presidential Primary – Buchanan County (2008)
Party	Candidate	Votes	%	±%
Democratic	Hillary Clinton	6,689	57.09	
Democratic	Barack Obama	4,427	37.78	
Democratic	Others/Uncommitted	601	5.13	

== See also ==
- List of counties in Missouri
- National Register of Historic Places listings in Buchanan County, Missouri
