= Contrary Creek (Missouri River tributary) =

Stream in the American state of Missouri

Coordinates: 39°41′29″N 94°58′02″W

Contrary Creek is a stream in Buchanan County in the U.S. state of Missouri. It is a tributary of the Missouri River.

Contrary Creek was named for the fact it runs in a different direction relative to other nearby streams. It flows into Lake Contrary before continuing to the Missouri River. It sources from near Bloomington was in eastern Bloomington Township.

== See also ==
- List of rivers of Missouri
