= Garrettsburg, Missouri =

Extinct hamlet in Missouri, U.S.

Coordinates: 39°41′15″N 94°42′04″W

Garrettsburg is an extinct hamlet in Buchanan County, in the U.S. state of Missouri.

== History ==
A post office called Garrettsburg was established in 1872, and remained in operation until 1902. The community has the name of Zach Garrett, a pioneer citizen.

== Geography ==
It was located in northwest Tremont Township along the Platte River midway between Agency and Easton.
