= Evalyn =

Evalyn is a given name. Notable people with the name include:

- Evalyn France, the first woman president of a national bank
- Evalyn Knapp (1906–1981), American film actress
- Evalyn Merrick (1953–2026), American politician
- Evalyn Parry, Canadian Quaker singer/songwriter and actress/playwright who grew up in Toronto, Ontario
- Evalyn Thomas (1861–1950), American arts educator
- Evalyn Walsh McLean (1886–1947), American mining heiress and socialite, the last private owner of the 45-carat (9.0 g) Hope Diamond

== See also ==
- Eveline (given name)
- Evelyn (name)
