= Gower, Missouri =

City in Buchanan and Clinton counties in Missouri, United States

- City
- Location of Gower, Missouri
- Coordinates: 39°36′47″N 94°35′41″W
- Country: United States
- State: Missouri
- Counties: Clinton and Buchanan
- Townships: Atchison and Platte

Area
  - Total: 1.01 sq mi (2.62 km^{2})
  - Land: 1.01 sq mi (2.62 km^{2})
  - Water: 0 sq mi (0.00 km^{2})
- Elevation: 984 ft (300 m)

Population (2020)
  - Total: 1,533
  - Density: 1,515.3/sq mi (585.05/km^{2})
- Time zone: UTC-6 (Central (CST))
  - Summer (DST): UTC-5 (CDT)
- ZIP code: 64454
- Area codes: 816, 975
- FIPS code: 29-28036
- GNIS feature ID: 2394938
- Website: www.gowermo.com

Gower is a city in Buchanan and Clinton counties Missouri, United States, that is part of the Kansas City metropolitan area. The population was 1,533 at the 2020 census.

The Buchanan County portion of Gower is part of the St. Joseph, MO–KS Metropolitan Statistical Area, while the Clinton County portion is part of the Kansas City, MO–KS Metropolitan Statistical Area.

== History ==
The city was named after A. G. Gower, a railroad official.

== Geography ==
According to the United States Census Bureau, the city has a total area of 1.00 square mile (2.59 km^{2}), all land.

== Demographics ==
Historical population
Census	Pop.	Note	%±
1880	163		—
1890	328		101.2%
1900	392		19.5%
1910	370		−5.6%
1920	418		13.0%
1930	378		−9.6%
1940	386		2.1%
1950	350		−9.3%
1960	406		16.0%
1970	758		86.7%
1980	1,276		68.3%
1990	1,249		−2.1%
2000	1,399		12.0%
2010	1,526		9.1%
2020	1,533		0.5%
U.S. Decennial Census

=== 2020 census ===
As of the 2020 census, Gower had a population of 1,533. The median age was 39.6 years. 25.6% of residents were under the age of 18 and 20.8% of residents were 65 years of age or older. For every 100 females there were 88.3 males, and for every 100 females age 18 and over there were 83.3 males age 18 and over.

0.0% of residents lived in urban areas, while 100.0% lived in rural areas.

There were 550 households in Gower, of which 39.1% had children under the age of 18 living in them. Of all households, 56.0% were married-couple households, 12.7% were households with a male householder and no spouse or partner present, and 26.0% were households with a female householder and no spouse or partner present. About 24.4% of all households were made up of individuals and 14.5% had someone living alone who was 65 years of age or older.

There were 589 housing units, of which 6.6% were vacant. The homeowner vacancy rate was 2.1% and the rental vacancy rate was 5.2%.

Racial composition as of the 2020 census
Race	Number	Percent
White	1,483	96.7%
Black or African American	3	0.2%
American Indian and Alaska Native	2	0.1%
Asian	2	0.1%
Native Hawaiian and Other Pacific Islander	3	0.2%
Some other race	3	0.2%
Two or more races	37	2.4%
Hispanic or Latino (of any race)	18	1.2%

=== 2010 census ===
As of the census of 2010, there were 1,526 people, 561 households, and 408 families living in the city. The population density was 1,526.0 inhabitants per square mile (589.2/km^{2}). There were 598 housing units at an average density of 598.0 per square mile (230.9/km^{2}). The racial makeup of the city was 98.4% White, 0.4% African American, 0.1% Native American, 0.2% Asian, and 1.0% from two or more races. Hispanic or Latino of any race were 0.4% of the population.

There were 561 households, of which 38.5% had children under the age of 18 living with them, 58.3% were married couples living together, 11.6% had a female householder with no husband present, 2.9% had a male householder with no wife present, and 27.3% were non-families. 24.1% of all households were made up of individuals, and 11.3% had someone living alone who was 65 years of age or older. The average household size was 2.60 and the average family size was 3.08.

The median age in the city was 37.9 years. 26.5% of residents were under the age of 18; 7.7% were between the ages of 18 and 24; 24.6% were from 25 to 44; 24.7% were from 45 to 64; and 16.3% were 65 years of age or older. The gender makeup of the city was 48.1% male and 51.9% female.

=== 2000 census ===
As of the census of 2000, there were 1,399 people, 536 households, and 393 families living in the city. The population density was 1,399.9 inhabitants per square mile (540.5/km^{2}). There were 549 housing units at an average density of 549.3 per square mile (212.1/km^{2}). The racial makeup of the city was 99.36% White, 0.14% African American, 0.14% Native American, and 0.36% from two or more races. Hispanic or Latino of any race were 0.79% of the population.

There were 536 households, out of which 38.4% had children under the age of 18 living with them, 61.2% were married couples living together, 9.9% had a female householder with no husband present, and 26.5% were non-families. 22.8% of all households were made up of individuals, and 14.6% had someone living alone who was 65 years of age or older. The average household size was 2.61 and the average family size was 3.09.

In the city the population was spread out, with 28.2% under the age of 18, 8.4% from 18 to 24, 29.8% from 25 to 44, 20.1% from 45 to 64, and 13.6% who were 65 years of age or older. The median age was 36 years. For every 100 females, there were 88.5 males. For every 100 females age 18 and over, there were 85.8 males.

The median income for a household in the city was $48,125, and the median income for a family was $55,694. Males had a median income of $35,313 versus $24,563 for females. The per capita income for the city was $19,408. About 2.4% of families and 3.8% of the population were below the poverty line, including 4.8% of those under age 18 and 3.5% of those age 65 or over.

== Education ==
The school district is East Buchanan County C-1 School District. The East Buchanan C-1 School District administration is headquartered in Gower. The high school, middle school, and elementary school are located in Gower; however, the middle school was formerly located in Easton.

== See also ==
- List of cities in Missouri
