= Dittemore =

Dittemore is a surname. Notable people with the surname include:

- John V. Dittemore (1876–1937), American Christian Science writer
- Lester Dittemore (1886–1966), American football player and coach
- Ron Dittemore (born 1952), NASA flight controller
