= Lake Township, Buchanan County, Missouri =

Township in Buchanan County, Missouri, U.S.

Lake Township
- Township
- View of Lake Township from Route KK, facing south

- Coordinates: 39°38′39″N 95°01′14″W
- Country: United States
- State: Missouri
- County: Buchanan

Area
  - Total: 10.16 sq mi (26.3 km^{2})
  - Land: 9.83 sq mi (25.5 km^{2})
  - Water: 0.33 sq mi (0.85 km^{2}) 3.25%
- Elevation: 801 ft (244 m)

Population (2020)
  - Total: 54
  - Density: 5.5/sq mi (2.1/km^{2})
- FIPS code: 29-02139800
- GNIS feature ID: 766341

Lake Township is a township in Buchanan County, Missouri, United States. At the 2020 census, its population was 54.

Lake Township takes its name from Lake Contrary.

== Geography ==
Lake Township covers an area of 9.85 square miles (25.5 km^{2}) and contains no incorporated settlements.

== Transportation ==
Lake Township contains one airport or landing strip, Booze Island Airport.

The following highways travel through the township:

- U.S. Route 59
- Route KK
