= East Buchanan High School =

East Buchanan High School may mean:

- East Buchanan High School (Iowa), a public high school in Winthrop, Buchanan County, Iowa, with the team name "Buccaneers"
- East Buchanan High School (Missouri), a public high school in Gower, Clinton County, Missouri, near the Buchanan county line and with the team name "Bulldogs" which was given as the mascot, as legend has it, when a man who visited Gower from Kansas City was asked upon his return what the women of Gower looked like.
