= 1889 United States House of Representatives elections =

- January 29, 1889 – November 30, 1889

15 (out of 336) seats to the United States House of Representatives 169 seats needed for a majority
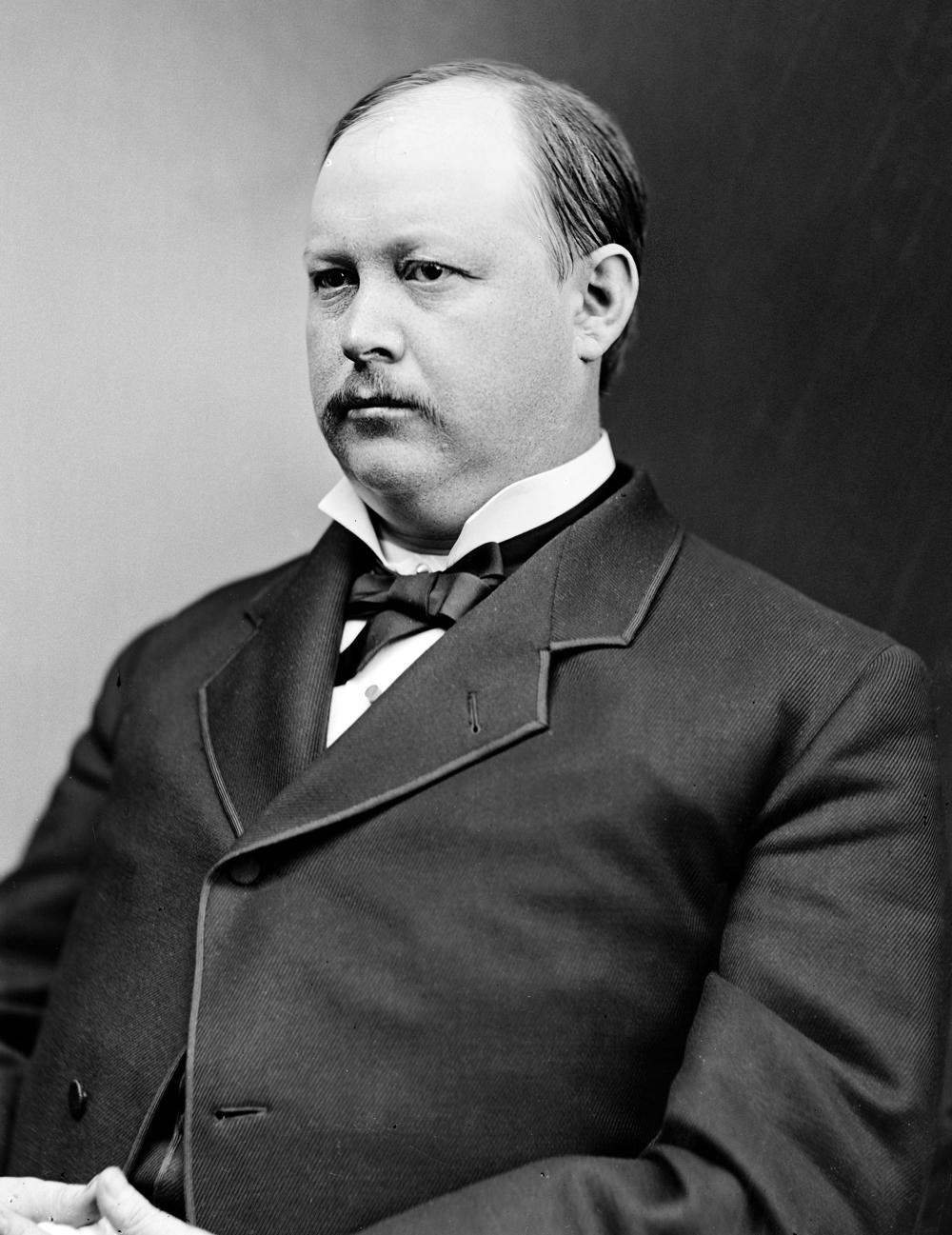

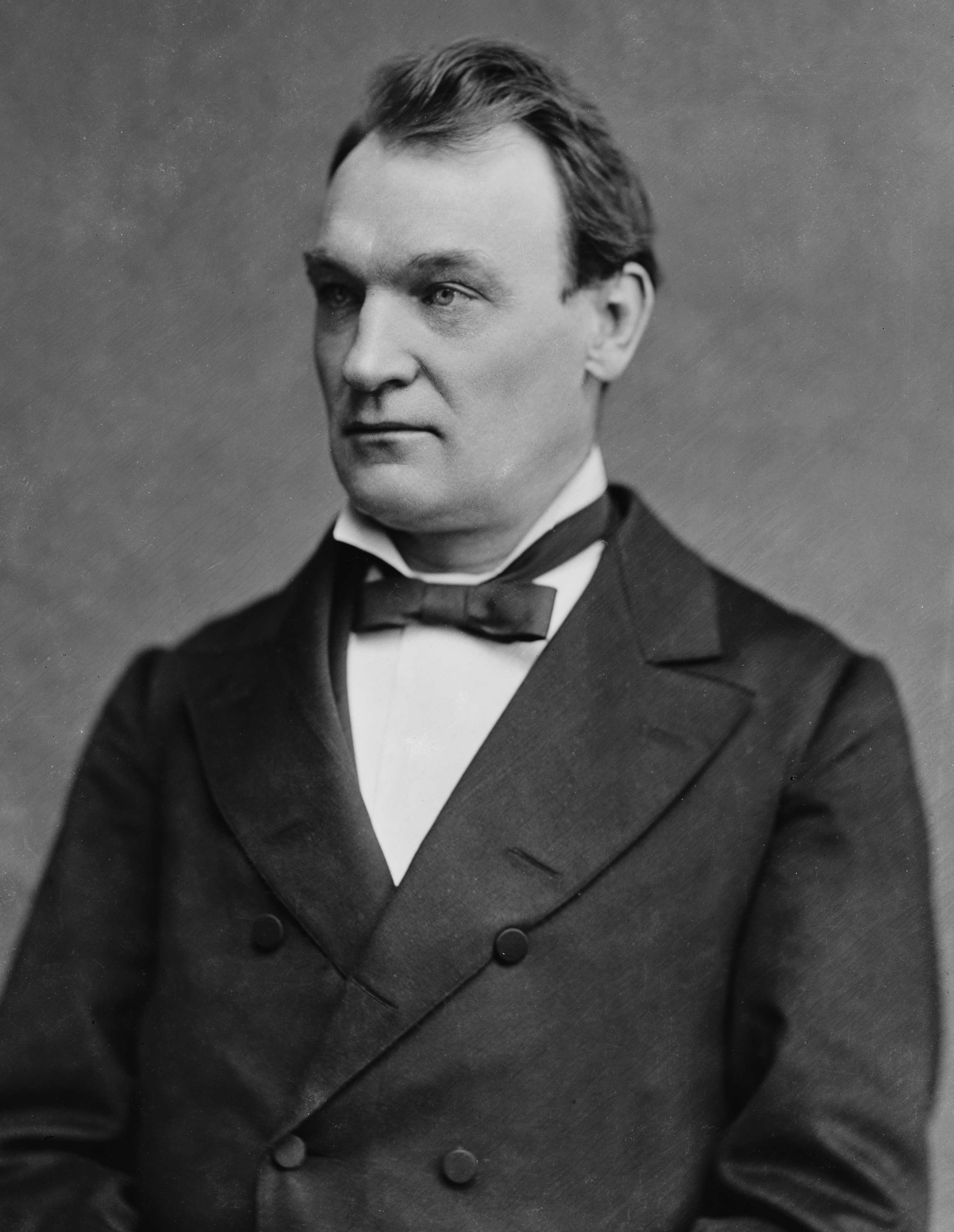
	Majority party	Minority party
Leader	Thomas Brackett Reed	John G. Carlisle
Party	Republican	Democratic
Leader's seat	Maine 1st	Kentucky 6th
Last election	179 seats	152 seats
Seats won	9	6
Seat change	▲5	Steady

There were 14 elections to the United States House of Representatives in 1889 to the 50th United States Congress and 51st United States Congress. Of these, at least 10 were special elections and 4 were general elections for new states.

One of the elections was for two seats, so the total members elected were 15.

The only gains came from new seats, created for the new states of Montana, South Dakota, North Dakota, and Washington. From these new states, 5 new Republicans were elected to the House.

Elections are listed by date and district.

== Special elections ==
=== 50th Congress ===
District	Incumbent			This race	
District	Member	Party	First elected	Results	Candidates
Indiana 1	Alvin P. Hovey	Republican	1886	Incumbent resigned January 17, 1889 to become Governor of Indiana. New member elected January 29, 1889 and seated February 6, 1889. Republican hold. Winner was not elected to the next term.	▌ ✓ Francis B. Posey (Republican) 52.13%; ▌William F. Parrett (Democratic) 47.87%
Missouri 4	James N. Burnes	Democratic	1882	Incumbent died January 23, 1889. elected February 19, 1889 and seated February 25, 1889. Democratic hold. Winner was not elected to the next term; see below.	▌ ✓ Charles F. Booher (Democratic) 52.29%; ▌Francis Posegate (Note: probably "Frances") (Republican) 47.71%

=== 51st Congress ===
District	Incumbent			This race	
District	Member	Party	First elected	Results	Candidates
Missouri 4	James N. Burnes	Democratic	1882	Incumbent member-elect died January 23, 1889. New member elected February 19, 1889 for the term starting March 4, 1889, and was seated December 2, 1889. Democratic hold. Winner was not elected to finish the current term; see above.	▌ ✓ Robert P. C. Wilson (Democratic) 51.4%; ▌Francis Posegate (Republican) 48.6%
Illinois 19	Richard W. Townshend	Democratic	1876	Incumbent died March 9, 1889. New member elected May 21, 1889 and seated December 2, 1889. Democratic hold.	▌ ✓ James R. Williams (Democratic) 54.56%; ▌Thomas S. Ridgway (Republican) 38.41%; ▌John P. Stelle (Farmers' Alliance) 6.04%; ▌William G. Showers (Prohibition) 0.98%
Kansas 4	Thomas Ryan	Republican	1876	Incumbent resigned April 4, 1889 after being appointed U.S. Minister to Mexico. New member elected May 21, 1889 and seated December 2, 1889. Republican hold.	▌ ✓ Harrison Kelley (Republican) 85.30%; ▌John Heaston (Democratic) 12.42%
Louisiana 3	Edward J. Gay	Democratic	1884	Incumbent died May 30, 1889. New member elected September 3, 1889 and seated December 2, 1889. Democratic hold.	▌ ✓ Andrew Price (Democratic) 62.19%; ▌H. C. Minor (Republican) 37.81%
Nebraska 2	James Laird	Republican	1882	Incumbent died August 17, 1889. New member elected November 5, 1889 and seated December 2, 1889. Republican hold.	▌ ✓ Gilbert L. Laws (Republican) 54.77%; ▌C. D. Casper (Democratic) 41.7%; ▌Charles Eugene Bentley (Prohibition) 3.58%
New York 9	Samuel S. Cox	Democratic	1856 (Ohio); 1864 (lost); 1868; 1885 (resigned); 1886	Incumbent died September 10, 1889. New member elected November 5, 1889 and seated December 2, 1889. Democratic hold.	▌ ✓ Amos J. Cummings (Democratic) 99.7%; ▌John L. Thomas (Prohibition) 0.3%
New York 27	Newton W. Nutting	Republican	1882; 1884 (lost); 1886	Incumbent died October 15, 1889. New member elected November 5, 1889 and seated December 2, 1889. Republican hold.	▌ ✓ Sereno E. Payne (Republican) 60.13%; ▌Woolsey R. Hopkins (Democratic) 38.31%; ▌Charles Mills (Prohibition) 1.56%
New York 6	Frank T. Fitzgerald	Democratic	1888	Incumbent resigned November 4, 1889 to become Register of New York County. New member elected November 30, 1889 and seated December 9, 1889. Democratic hold.	▌ ✓ Charles H. Turner (Democratic) 82.3%; ▌George W. Collier (Republican) 13.9%; ▌Michael Hines (Prohibition) 2.31%; ▌John J. Haley (Unknown) 1.49%

== Montana ==
Montana Results Carter: 50–60% 60–70% Maginnis: 50–60%

District	Incumbent			This race	
District	Member	Party	First elected	Results	Candidates
Montana at-large	None (new state)			New seat. New member elected October 1, 1889 and seated December 2, 1889. Republican gain.	▌ ✓ Thomas H. Carter (Republican) 51.9%; ▌Martin Maginnis (Democratic) 48.1%

== North Dakota ==
District	Incumbent			This race	
District	Member	Party	First elected	Results	Candidates
North Dakota at-large	None (new state)			New seat. New member elected October 1, 1889 and seated December 2, 1889. Republican gain.	▌ ✓ Henry C. Hansbrough (Republican) 68.37%; ▌D. W. Maratta (Democratic) 31.63%

== South Dakota ==
District	Incumbent			This race	
District	Member	Party	First elected	Results	Candidates
South Dakota at-large 2 seats on a general ticket	None (new state)			New seat. New member elected October 1, 1889 and seated December 2, 1889. Republican gain.	▌ ✓ Oscar S. Gifford (Republican) 35.51%; ▌ ✓ John A. Pickler (Republican) 34.94%; ▌Linneus Q. Jeffries (Democratic) 15.00%; ▌S. M. Booth (Democratic) 14.56%
South Dakota at-large 2 seats on a general ticket	None (new state)			New seat. New member elected October 1, 1889 and seated December 2, 1889. Republican gain.	▌ ✓ Oscar S. Gifford (Republican) 35.51%; ▌ ✓ John A. Pickler (Republican) 34.94%; ▌Linneus Q. Jeffries (Democratic) 15.00%; ▌S. M. Booth (Democratic) 14.56%

== Washington ==
District	Incumbent			This race	
District	Member	Party	First elected	Results	Candidates
Washington at-large	None (new state)			New seat. New member elected October 1, 1889 and seated December 2, 1889. Republican gain.	▌ ✓ John L. Wilson (Republican) 58.1%; ▌Thomas C. Griffiths (Democratic) 41.8%
