= Saxton =

Saxton can refer to:

== Places ==
=== United States ===
- Saxton, Kentucky, USA
- Saxton, Missouri, USA
- Saxton, Pennsylvania, USA
  - Saxton Nuclear Generating Station
- Camp Saxton Site, Port Royal, South Carolina, USA

=== Other places ===
- Saxton, North Yorkshire, England, UK
- Saxton, New Zealand, a suburb of Nelson
  - Saxton Oval, a cricket ground
- Saxton River, a river in Marlborough Region, South island, New Zealand
- Saxton Ridge, Antarctica

== People ==
=== Surname ===
- Alexander Saxton (1919–2012), American historian and novelist
- Christopher Saxton (c. 1540–c. 1610), English cartographer
- Jad Saxton (born 1979), American voice actress
- Jim Saxton (born 1943), congressman from New Jersey
- Joseph Saxton (1799–1873), American inventor
- Robert Saxton (born 1953), British composer
- Ron Saxton (born 1954), Oregon politician
- Rufus Saxton, (1824–1908) American general
- Tommy Saxton (born 1983), English rugby league footballer
- Victaria Saxton (born 1999), American basketball player

=== Titles ===
- Saxton baronets, a title in the baronetage of Great Britain

== Other uses ==
- The Saxton Group, a U.S. restaurant franchisee
- Saxton Hale, a character in the video game Team Fortress 2

== See also ==
- Saxtons River, a river in Vermont, United States
- Saxtons River, Vermont, USA, a village
