= Center Township, Buchanan County, Missouri =

Township in Buchanan County, Missouri, U.S.

Center Township
- Township
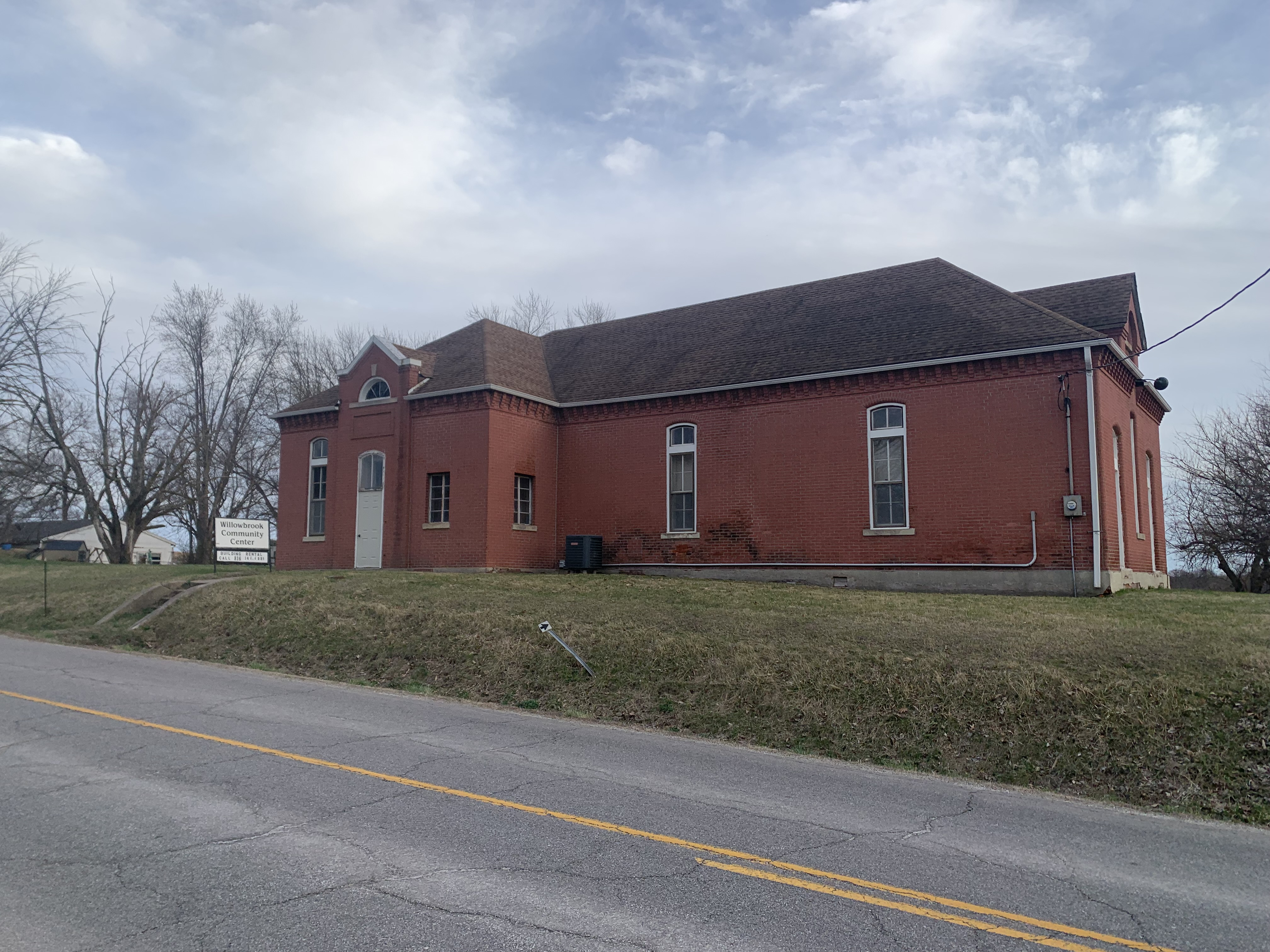
- Willowbrook Community Center at Willow Brook

- Coordinates: 39°40′03″N 94°49′27″W
- Country: United States
- State: Missouri
- County: Buchanan

Area
  - Total: 36.01 sq mi (93.3 km^{2})
  - Land: 35.85 sq mi (92.9 km^{2})
  - Water: 0.16 sq mi (0.41 km^{2}) 0.44%
- Elevation: 1,102 ft (336 m)

Population (2020)
  - Total: 2,950
  - Density: 82.3/sq mi (31.8/km^{2})
- FIPS code: 29-02112484
- GNIS feature ID: 766338

Center Township is a township in Buchanan County, Missouri, United States. At the 2020 census, its population was 2950.

Center Township was established in 1841, and named for its location near the geographical center of Buchanan County.

== Geography ==
Center Township covers an area of 36.32 square miles (94.1 km^{2}) and contains no incorporated settlements. It contains five cemeteries: Feuquay, New King Hill, Old Sparta, Parker and Pleasant Ridge.

Pinkston is an extinct hamlet in central Center Township and rail station on the Kansas City, Clay County and St. Joseph Railway It was located near the headwaters of Bee Creek on Route A north of Willow Brook.

== Transportation ==
The following highways travel through the township:

- Interstate 29
- Interstate 229
- U.S. Route 59
- U.S. Route 71
- Route 371
- Route A
- Route CC
- Route FF
- Route H
- Route JJ
- Route O
- Route V
