= Tremont Township =

Tremont Township may refer to the following townships in the United States:

- Tremont Township, Tazewell County, Illinois
- Tremont Township, Buchanan County, Missouri
- Tremont Township, Pennsylvania
