= De Kalb, Missouri =

- City
- Location of De Kalb, Missouri

- Location within Missouri Location within the United States
- Coordinates: 39°35′18″N 94°55′25″W
- Country: United States
- State: Missouri
- County: Buchanan
- Township: Bloomington
- Incorporated: 1850

Area
  - Total: 0.25 sq mi (0.66 km^{2})
  - Land: 0.25 sq mi (0.66 km^{2})
  - Water: 0 sq mi (0.00 km^{2})
- Elevation: 1,129 ft (344 m)

Population (2020)
  - Total: 233
  - Density: 913.5/sq mi (352.71/km^{2})
- Time zone: UTC-6 (Central (CST))
  - Summer (DST): UTC-5 (CDT)
- ZIP code: 64440
- Area code: 816
- FIPS code: 29-18946
- GNIS feature ID: 2396682

De Kalb is a city in southwest Buchanan County, Missouri, United States. The population was 233 at the 2020 census. It is part of the St. Joseph, MO–KS Metropolitan Statistical Area.

== History ==
De Kalb was originally known as Bloomington, and under the latter name was laid out in 1839. It was renamed in 1851 for Johann von Robais, Baron de Kalb, a major general in the American Revolutionary War. A post office called De Kalb has been in operation since 1840.

== Geography ==
According to the United States Census Bureau, the city has a total area of 0.25 square miles (0.65 km^{2}), all land.

== Demographics ==
Historical population
| Census | Pop. | Note | %± |
|---|---|---|---|
| 1860 | 308 | | — |
| 1870 | 224 | | −27.3% |
| 1880 | 237 | | 5.8% |
| 1890 | 343 | | 44.7% |
| 1900 | 362 | | 5.5% |
| 1910 | 391 | | 8.0% |
| 1920 | 401 | | 2.6% |
| 1930 | 356 | | −11.2% |
| 1940 | 314 | | −11.8% |
| 1950 | 300 | | −4.5% |
| 1960 | 304 | | 1.3% |
| 1970 | 287 | | −5.6% |
| 1980 | 245 | | −14.6% |
| 1990 | 222 | | −9.4% |
| 2000 | 257 | | 15.8% |
| 2010 | 220 | | −14.4% |
| 2020 | 233 | | 5.9% |
U.S. Decennial Census

=== 2010 census ===
As of the census of 2010, there were 220 people, 87 households, and 65 families residing in the city. The population density was 880.0 inhabitants per square mile (339.8/km^{2}). There were 97 housing units at an average density of 388.0 per square mile (149.8/km^{2}). The racial makeup of the city was 99.1% White, 0.5% African American, and 0.5% from two or more races. Hispanic or Latino of any race were 0.5% of the population.

There were 87 households, of which 40.2% had children under the age of 18 living with them, 59.8% were married couples living together, 11.5% had a female householder with no husband present, 3.4% had a male householder with no wife present, and 25.3% were non-families. 18.4% of all households were made up of individuals, and 12.6% had someone living alone who was 65 years of age or older. The average household size was 2.53 and the average family size was 2.86.

The median age in the city was 37.3 years. 25.5% of residents were under the age of 18; 10.5% were between the ages of 18 and 24; 26% were from 25 to 44; 23.2% were from 45 to 64; and 15% were 65 years of age or older. The gender makeup of the city was 47.7% male and 52.3% female.

=== 2000 census ===
As of the census of 2000, there were 257 people, 101 households, and 73 families residing in the town. The population density was 1,017.0 inhabitants per square mile (392.7/km^{2}). There were 105 housing units at an average density of 415.5 per square mile (160.4/km^{2}). The racial makeup of the town was 97.28% White, 0.78% Native American, and 1.95% from two or more races. Hispanic or Latino of any race were 0.39% of the population.

There were 101 households, out of which 34.7% had children under the age of 18 living with them, 63.4% were married couples living together, 5.0% had a female householder with no husband present, and 27.7% were non-families. 24.8% of all households were made up of individuals, and 14.9% had someone living alone who was 65 years of age or older. The average household size was 2.54 and the average family size was 3.04.

In the town the population was spread out, with 25.7% under the age of 18, 8.2% from 18 to 24, 31.5% from 25 to 44, 19.1% from 45 to 64, and 15.6% who were 65 years of age or older. The median age was 34 years. For every 100 females, there were 97.7 males. For every 100 females age 18 and over, there were 101.1 males.

The median income for a household in the town was $38,750, and the median income for a family was $49,688. Males had a median income of $33,750 versus $19,205 for females. The per capita income for the town was $18,880. About 3.2% of families and 3.0% of the population were below the poverty line, including none of those under the age of eighteen and 2.6% of those 65 or over.

== Education ==
The school district is Buchanan County R-IV School District.
