= Halleck, Missouri =

- Extinct hamlet
- Location within Missouri Location within the United States
- Coordinates: 39°34′41″N 94°49′15″W
- Country: United States
- State: Missouri
- County: Buchanan
- Time zone: UTC-6 (Central (CST))
  - Summer (DST): UTC-5

Halleck is an extinct hamlet in Buchanan County, in the U.S. state of Missouri.

== History ==
A post office called Halleck was established in 1862, and remained in operation until 1902. The community was named in honor of Henry Halleck, a U.S. Army officer.
