= St. Joseph Transit =

Public transportation entity in Missouri

- Headquarters: 702 S. 5th St.
- Locale: St. Joseph, Missouri
- Service area: Buchanan County, Missouri
- Service type: bus service, paratransit
- Routes: 8
- Website: Transit

St. Joseph Transit provides local public transportation, as a division of the Public Works and Transportation Department of the City of St. Joseph in Buchanan County, Missouri. Eight routes, operating under the brand "The Ride", provide regular Monday through Saturday service. On August 15, 2022, St. Joseph Transit launched a route redesign, which led to routes being serviced by buses every 30 minutes, rather than 45 under the previous system. However, the number of routes went from 12 under the old system, to 8 under the new design.

== Facilities ==
=== Administration ===
Address: 702 South 5th St.
Coordinates: 39°45′37.8″N 94°51′13.5″W
Facilities: Administration and fleet maintenance

=== Transit Center ===
A St. Joseph Transit bus at the Transit Center.

Address: 611 Angelique St.
Coordinates: 39°45′49.0″N 94°51′09″W
Facilities: Waiting area, ticket booth, bus connections

== Routes ==
"The Ride" has eight regularly scheduled routes originating at the downtown transit center. The transit center is also serviced by Jefferson Lines, providing connections to destinations throughout the central states.

No.	Name	Destinations	Notes
11	St. Joseph Ave	King Parkway, North Wal-Mart	
12	Lovers Lane	North K-Mart, North Wal-Mart	
13	Frederick Ave	East Hills Mall, Heartland Regional Medical Center, HyVee	
14	Faraon/Jules	North Village, North Wal-Mart	
15	Missouri Western	Missouri Western State University	
16	Industrial Park	South Belt Hwy US169, South Wal-Mart	
17	Stockyards	US59 /Elizabeth Ave, South Wal-Mart	
18	King Hill	Elwood, South Wal-Mart	

== See also ==
- List of intercity bus stops in Missouri
