= Kenmoor, Missouri =

Extinct hamlets in Missouri, U.S.

Coordinates: 39°39′03″N 94°56′23″W

Kenmoor is an extinct hamlet in Buchanan County, in the U.S. state of Missouri.

== History ==
A post office called Kenmoor was established in 1886, and remained in operation until 1904. The community was named for a local businessman in the telephony industry.
