= Lake Contrary =

- Location within Missouri Location within the United States
- Location: Buchanan County, Missouri
- Coordinates: 39°43′17″N 94°54′58″W
- Type: oxbow lake
- Basin countries: United States
- Max. length: 10 miles (16.1 km)
- Max. width: 0.5 miles (0.8 km)
- Surface area: 335 acres (1.4 km^{2})
- Surface elevation: 797 ft (243 m)

Lake Contrary is an oxbow lake in Buchanan County, Missouri just southwest of St. Joseph. The lake is named after the stream Contrary Creek, which flows northward contrary to most other nearby streams into this lake.

The lake was a frequented fishing location, and an amusement park once existed there. The lake has steadily dried up, and now the majority of it is dry. Presently, the lake is surrounded by residential houses. There is a public beach on the eastern side of what remains of the lake.

== History ==
In the late 19th-Century, meat packers of Kansas City and St. Joseph harvested ice from this lake.

== Amusement Park ==
In 1890, what became an amusement park opened at Lake Contrary. Over the coming decades many rides and attractions opened around the lake. The amusement park was sentimentally coined the "Coney Island" of St. Joseph. The amusement park closed in 1964 and the decades since the park has declined as a beach as well.

== Dredging Operations ==
Buchanan County and the Corps of Engineers have put forward a plan to dredge the lake to restore the lake's environment and revitalize the recreation. There is general public sentiment for this to occur especially from those who remember visiting the beach and amusement park.
