= Lester Dittemore =

American football player and coach (1886–1966)

Biographical details
- Born: June 27, 1886; Halls, Missouri, U.S.
- Died: December 19, 1966 (aged 80); Topeka, Kansas, U.S.
- Education: Springfield (MA) YMCA

Playing career
- 1904–1907: Central Missouri

Coaching career (HC unless noted)
- 1911: Alfred

Administrative career (AD unless noted)
- 1911–1912: Alfred
- 1916–1920: Pierre HS (SD)

Head coaching record
- Overall: 2–2

Lester Poe Dittemore (June 27, 1886 – December 19, 1966) was an American football player and coach. He served as the head football coach at Alfred University in Alfred, New York in 1911 compiling a record of 2–2.

== Head coaching record ==
Year	Team	Overall	Conference	Standing	Bowl/playoffs
Alfred Saxons (Independent) (1911)
1911	Alfred	2–2			
Alfred:		2–2			
Total:		2–2			
