= Virgil Ward =

American fisherman (1911–2004)

- Born: Virgil Victor Ward; May 25, 1911; Easton, Missouri, U.S.
- Died: September 13, 2004 (aged 93); Amsterdam, Missouri, U.S.
- Known for: Professional fisherman, television host

Virgil Victor Ward (May 25, 1911 – September 13, 2004) was a freshwater sportfishing competitor, businessman, and media personality for fishing and conservation. He was the winner of the 1958 Regional Bass Competition, the 1962 World Series of Sport Fishing, the 1964 National Championship of Fresh Water Fishing and 1964 Outdoor Writers and Broadcasters National Fishing Tournament.

In addition to his popular television show Championship Fishing, Ward is a member of the Ozark Fisherman’s Hall of Fame, the International Fishing Hall of Fame and the National Fresh Water Fishing Hall of Fame and the Bass Fishing Hall of Fame. Ward was awarded The Dolphin Award - fishing’s highest recognition.
