= Sparta, Buchanan County, Missouri =

Unincorporated community in the U.S. state of Missouri

Coordinates: 39°39′01″N 94°49′59″W

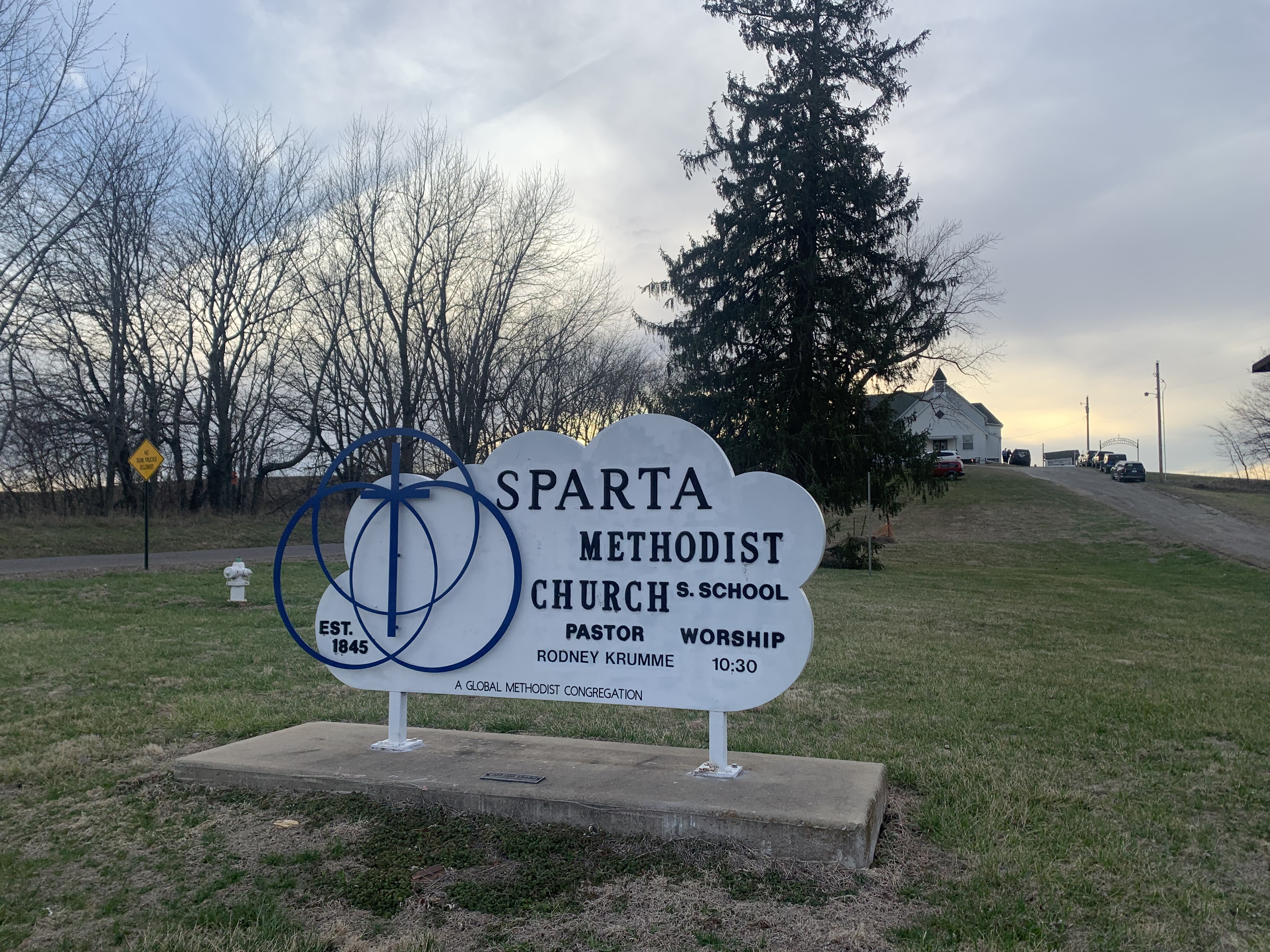
Sparta Methodist Church, June 2025

Sparta is an unincorporated community in Buchanan County, Missouri, United States.

== History ==
Sparta was originally called Benton, and under the latter name was platted in 1840. A post office called Sparta was established in 1841, and remained in operation until 1865. The community was designated as the county seat until 1846, though some maps erroneously denote it as such afterward.
