= Platte Township, Buchanan County, Missouri =

Township in Buchanan County, Missouri, U.S.

Platte Township
- Township
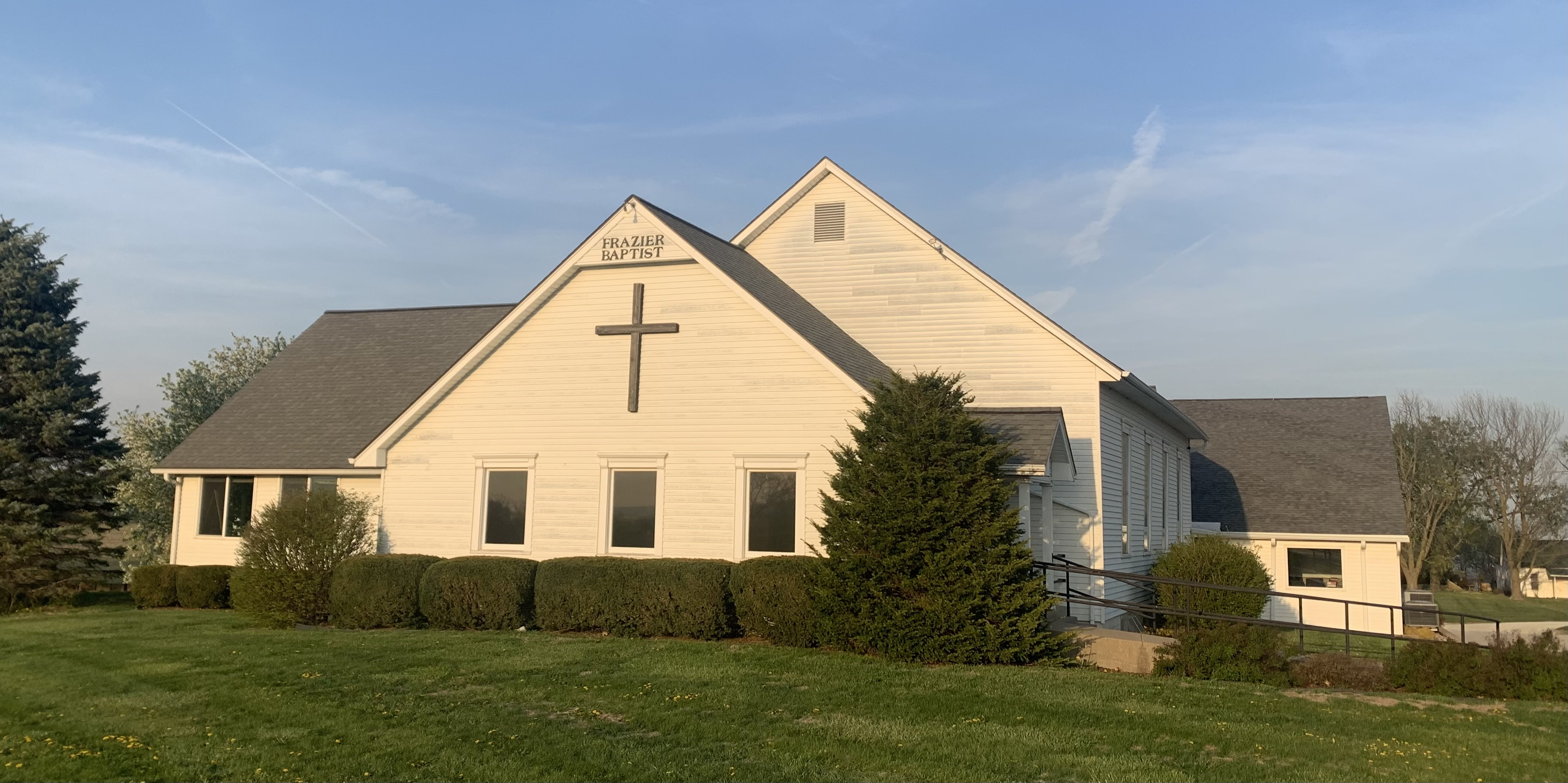
- Frazier Baptist Church at Fraizer

- Coordinates: 39°34′34″N 94°38′50″W
- Country: United States
- State: Missouri
- County: Buchanan

Area
  - Total: 31.11 sq mi (80.6 km^{2})
  - Land: 30.75 sq mi (79.6 km^{2})
  - Water: 0.36 sq mi (0.93 km^{2}) 1.16%
- Elevation: 827 ft (252 m)

Population (2020)
  - Total: 514
  - Density: 16.7/sq mi (6.4/km^{2})
- FIPS code: 29-02158124
- GNIS feature ID: 766343

Platte Township is a township in Buchanan County, Missouri, United States. At the 2020 census, its population was 514.

Platte Township was established in 1839, taking its name from the Platte River.

== Geography ==
Platte Township covers an area of 30.77 square miles (79.7 km^{2}) and contains no incorporated settlements. It contains six cemeteries: Allen, Frazier, Hebron, Number 6, Tobin, and Witts.

The streams of Belcher Branch, Castile Creek, Crabapple Branch, DeMoss Branch, Frazier Branch, Jenkins Branch, Malden Creek, and Wolfpen Creek run through this township.

== Transportation ==
The following highways travel through the township:

- Route 116
- Route B
- Route DD
- Route E
- Route H
