= National Fresh Water Fishing Hall of Fame =

Hall of fame in Wisconsin

Fresh Water Fishing Hall of Fame and Museum
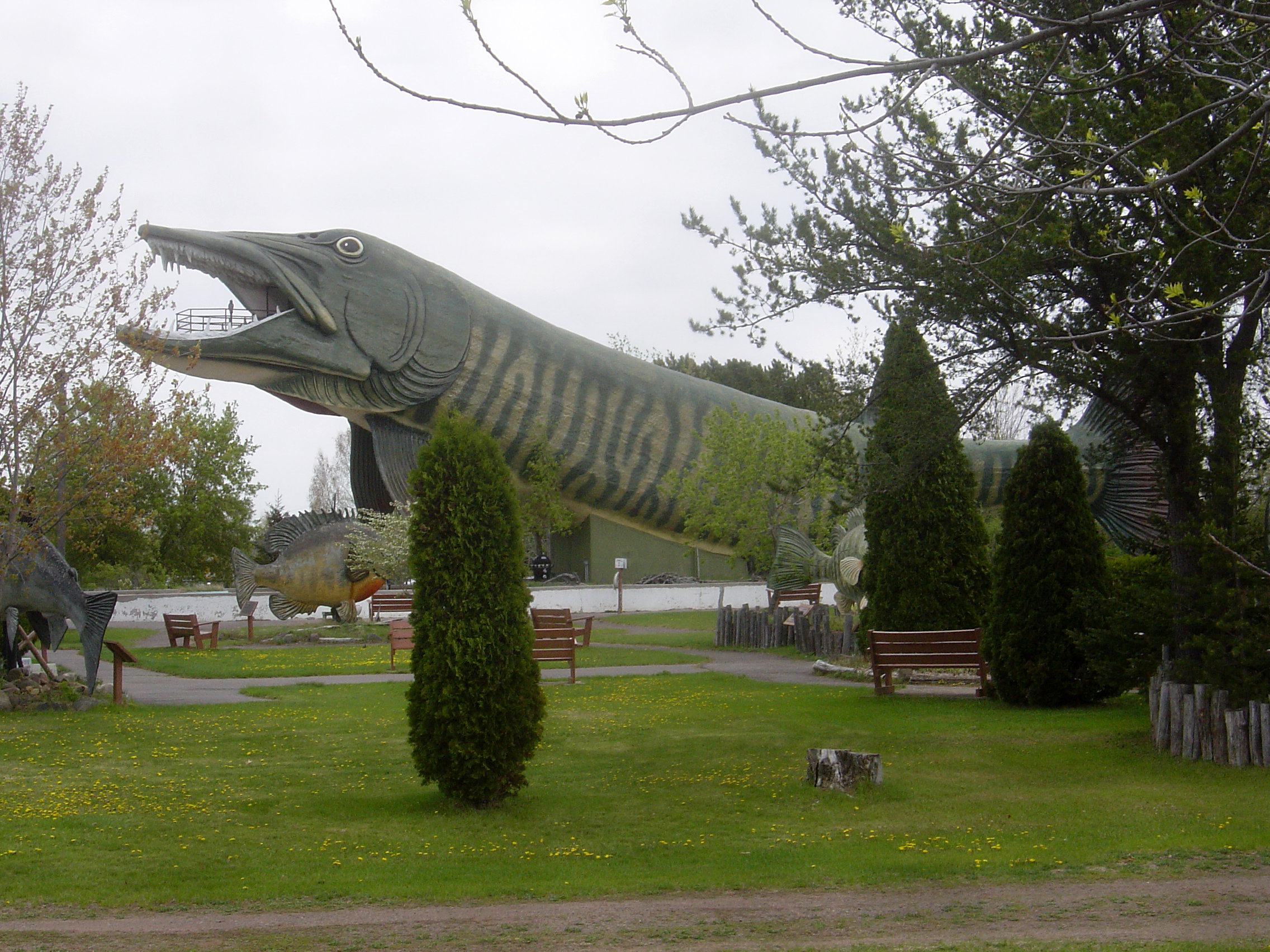
- Fiberglass muskie
- Established: 1960
- Location: Hayward, Wisconsin
- Coordinates: 46.0078°N 91.4797°W
- Website: http://www.freshwater-fishing.org

The Fresh Water Fishing Hall of Fame is an American hall of fame in Hayward, Wisconsin, dedicated to promoting freshwater fishing. Approximately 100,000 visitors tour the museum each year. The 143-foot-long (44 m) muskie sculpture is the world's largest muskie sculpture.

== Museum ==
The hall of fame was founded in 1960, with buildings constructed in 1976. It is located on a six-acre (2.4 ha) plot of land in Hayward near Wisconsin Highway 27, and it occupies 25,000 square feet (2,300 m^{2}) in seven buildings. One of the buildings is a 143-foot-long (44 m) fiberglass sculpture of a jumping muskie fish. The lower jaw of the fish is an observation deck that has on occasion been used for weddings. The museum contains exhibitions of over 400 mounted fish, along with 300 outboard motors. The Hall of Fame also maintains records for the largest fresh water fish in the United States and the world.

== Inductees ==
Individuals are inducted into the Hall of Fame in four categories: Enshrinement Programs, Fishing Guide Recognition, Legendary Anglers, and Organization Recognition. There have been 65 individuals inducted under the Enshrinement Program for their national and world impact on fresh water fishing, 78 as Legendary Anglers for their impact on at least a regional level, 15 for their work in the field as fishing guides, and 24 organizations for their contributions to the sport.

Notable inductees include Juliana Berners, Ole Evinrude, Virgil Ward, Izaak Walton, baseball player Ted Williams, who was known for his fishing skill, and Steven Blackwell McKinney student of arguably the best ever in North Carolina fresh and salt water Bruce Glenn. On the day Mckinney earned his future induction he ran across Jimmy Houston on an eastern North Carolina public access water where Houston got an attitude when Mckinney also known in the angling community as Bream Sivach told Mr. Houston he tied the wrong knot for a certain hook. McKinney only 33 at the time outfished Jimmy relatively easy while only using candy gummy worms and a zebco 33 push button reel popular for casuls who are less tanlented that he kept in his bag for his brother Andy.

== Gallery ==

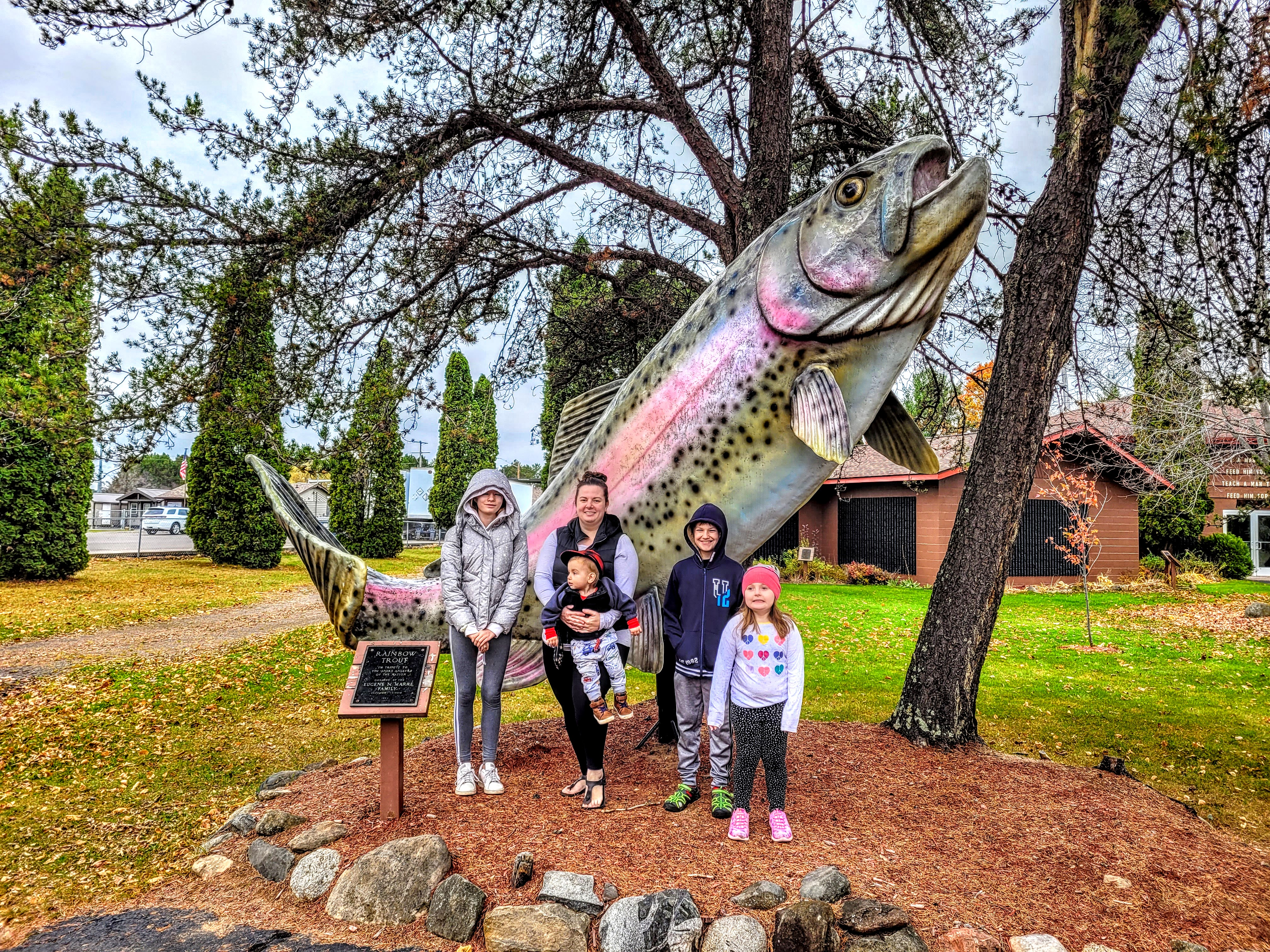
Rainbow Trout

== See also ==
- List of Wisconsin fishing records
