= San Antonio, Missouri =

Unincorporated community in Buchanan County, Missouri, United States

Coordinates: 39°46′37″N 94°41′01″W

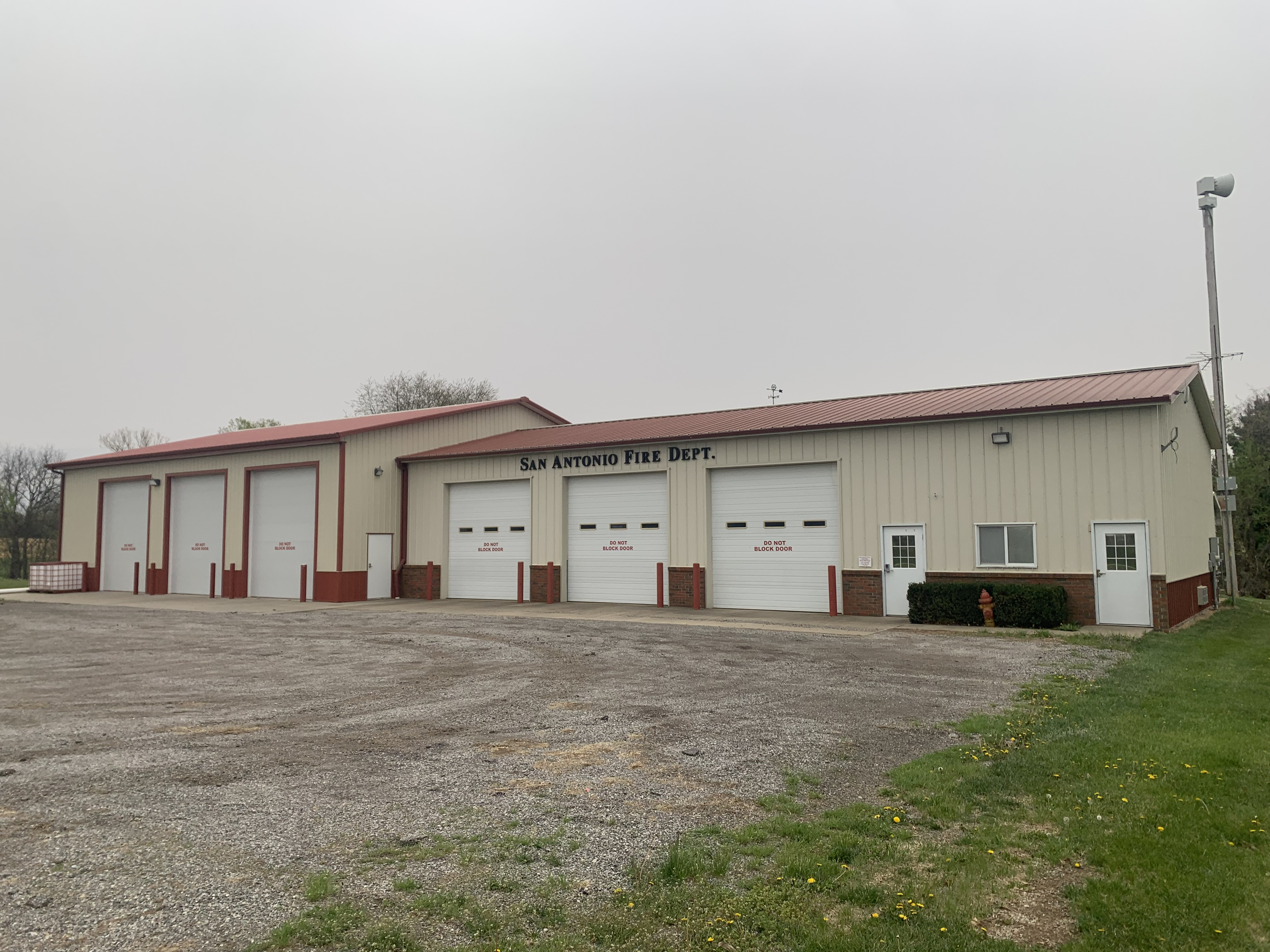
San Antonio Fire Department at San Antonio, April 2025

San Antonio is an unincorporated community in Buchanan County, Missouri, United States.

== History ==
A post office called San Antonio was established in 1855, and remained in operation until 1901. The community's name most likely is a transfer from San Antonio, Texas.
