= Evalyn Thomas =

American arts educator

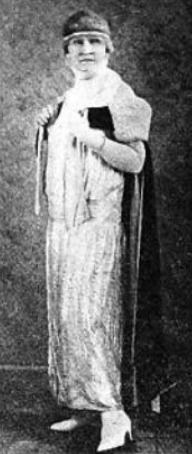
- Evalyn Thomas, from a 1928 publication
- Born: Evalyn Anne Thomas; 1861; Buchanan County, Missouri, U.S.
- Died: March 27, 1950 (aged 88–89); Los Angeles, California, U.S.
- Occupations: Theatre professional, arts educator
- Relatives: 1

Evalyn Ann Thomas (1861 – March 27, 1950) was an American arts educator and theatre professional. She taught at the University of California, Los Angeles, from 1917 to 1938, during its transition from a normal school to a branch of the University of California system. She was known for her elaborate annual productions of Greek dramas on campus.

== Early life and education ==
Thomas was born in Buchanan County, Missouri, one of the thirteen children of Robert Martin Bean Thomas and Mary Anne Ewart Thomas. Her mother died in 1871. Thomas attended the University of Missouri, and earned a diploma from the Emerson School of Oratory in Boston in 1903. She received a Bachelor of Literary Interpretation degree from Emerson in 1920.

== Career ==
Thomas taught dramatic literature at Ellensburg Teachers College in Washington from 1904 to 1910. She toured in England from 1911 to 1912 giving dramatic readings. She moved to Los Angeles by the end of 1912, and continued giving recitals there. She was especially known for her costumed performances as Electra.

Thomas taught at the California State Normal School from 1917 to 1919. From 1919 to 1938, Thomas taught English and directed theatre programs at the University of California, Los Angeles, during its first years as a branch of the University of California. She produced an annual Greek drama with elaborate productions and large casts, including Antigone in 1917, Ajax of Sophocles in 1927, Hippolytus in 1928, and Oedipus Rex in 1938. In August 1924, she directed an "ambitious" production of Oedipus Rex in front of the Stanford Museum.

== Personal life and legacy ==
Thomas died in 1950, at her home in Westwood, in her late eighties. "Her amazing vitality, her salient force of character, her vigor of address, her lively and sometimes slightly grim humor, made her both a memorable colleague and a memorable teacher," according to a tribute essay published in 1957. UCLA has an Evalyn Thomas Memorial Scholarship Fund, named in her memory in 1946, to benefit incoming freshmen and transfer students.
