= Willow Brook, Missouri =

Unincorporated community in Buchanan County, Missouri, United States

Coordinates: 39°37′55″N 94°47′45″W

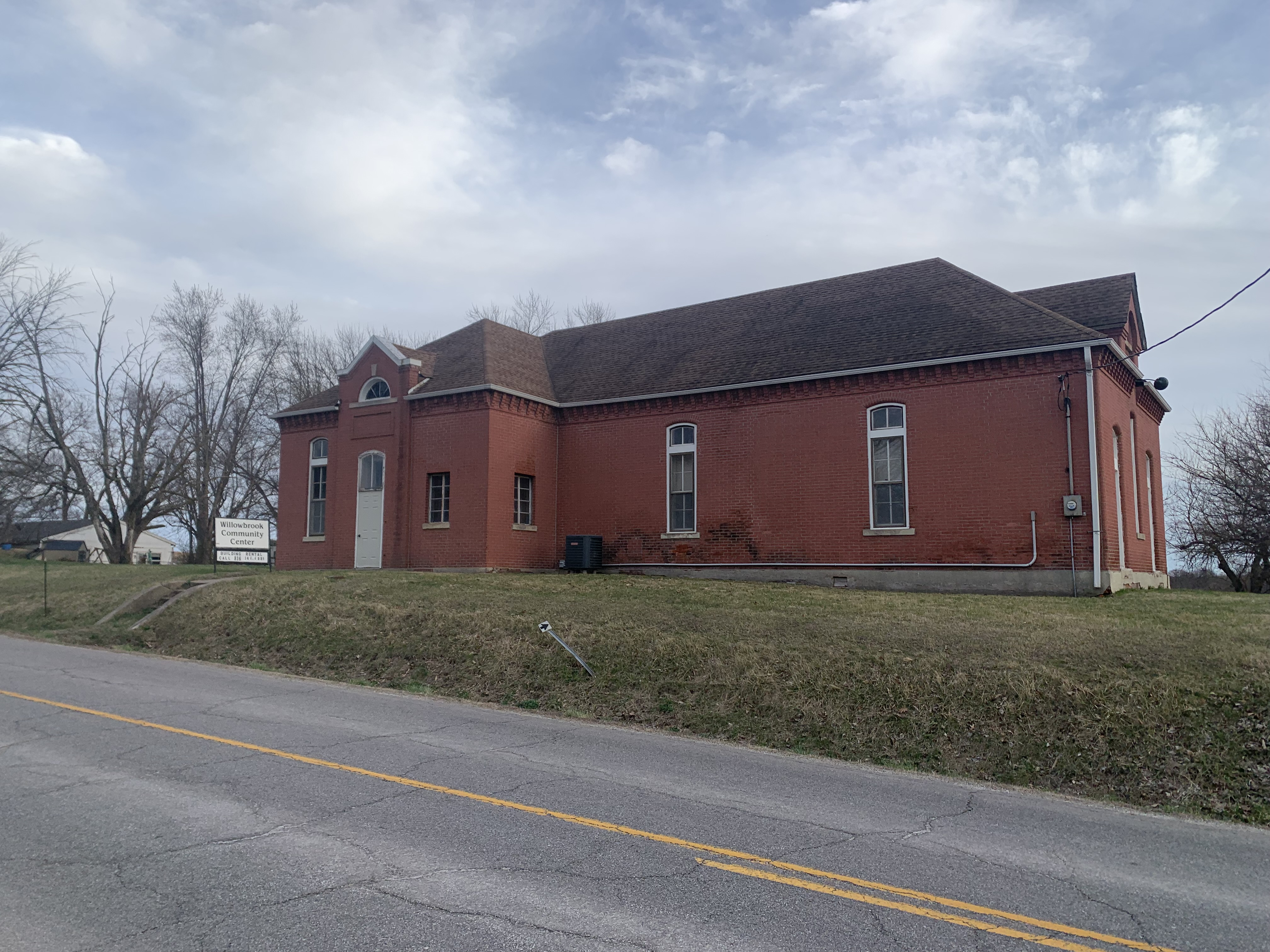
Willowbrook Community Center March 2025

Willow Brook is an unincorporated community in Buchanan County, Missouri, United States.

== History ==
A post office called Willow Brook was established in 1878, and remained in operation until 1911. The community was named for the willow timber along a nearby creek. By 1895, Willow Brook had a post office, railroad station, and express office.
