= Halls, Missouri =

Unincorporated community in Missouri, U.S.

Coordinates: 39°38′00″N 94°58′24″W

Street in Halls, MO

Halls is an unincorporated community in Buchanan County, in the U.S. state of Missouri.

== History ==
A former variant name was "Eveline". A post office called Eveline was established in 1866, the name was changed to Halls in 1876, and the post office closed in 1954. The present name honors Willard Preble Hall, 17th Governor of Missouri.
