= Saxton, Missouri =

Extinct hamlet in Missouri, U.S.

Coordinates: 39°43′21″N 94°45′33″W

Saxton is an extinct hamlet in Buchanan County, in the U.S. state of Missouri.

== History ==
A post office called Saxton was established in 1872, and remained in operation until 1938. The community was named after Albe M. Saxton, the original owner of the town site.
