= Bloomington Township, Buchanan County, Missouri =

Township in Buchanan County, Missouri, U.S.

Bloomington Township
- Township
- Coordinates: 39°34′40″N 94°56′31″W
- Country: United States
- State: Missouri
- County: Buchanan

Area
  - Total: 35.37 sq mi (91.6 km^{2})
  - Land: 35.33 sq mi (91.5 km^{2})
  - Water: 0.04 sq mi (0.10 km^{2}) 0.11%
- Elevation: 1,033 ft (315 m)

Population (2020)
  - Total: 695
  - Density: 19.7/sq mi (7.6/km^{2})
- FIPS code: 29-02106418
- GNIS feature ID: 766337

Bloomington Township is a township in Buchanan County, Missouri, United States. At the 2020 census, its population was 695.

Bloomington Township was organized in 1839; the name Bloomington is an old variant name of De Kalb.

== Geography ==
Bloomington Township covers an area of 35.44 square miles (91.8 km^{2}) and contains one incorporated settlement, De Kalb. It contains two cemeteries: Jones and West Lawn.

The stream of South Sugar Creek runs through this township.

== Transportation ==
The following highways travel through the township:

- Route 116
- Route HH
- Route JJ
- Route M
