= Frazier, Missouri =

Unincorporated community in Buchanan County, Missouri, United States

Coordinates: 39°37′44″N 94°40′04″W

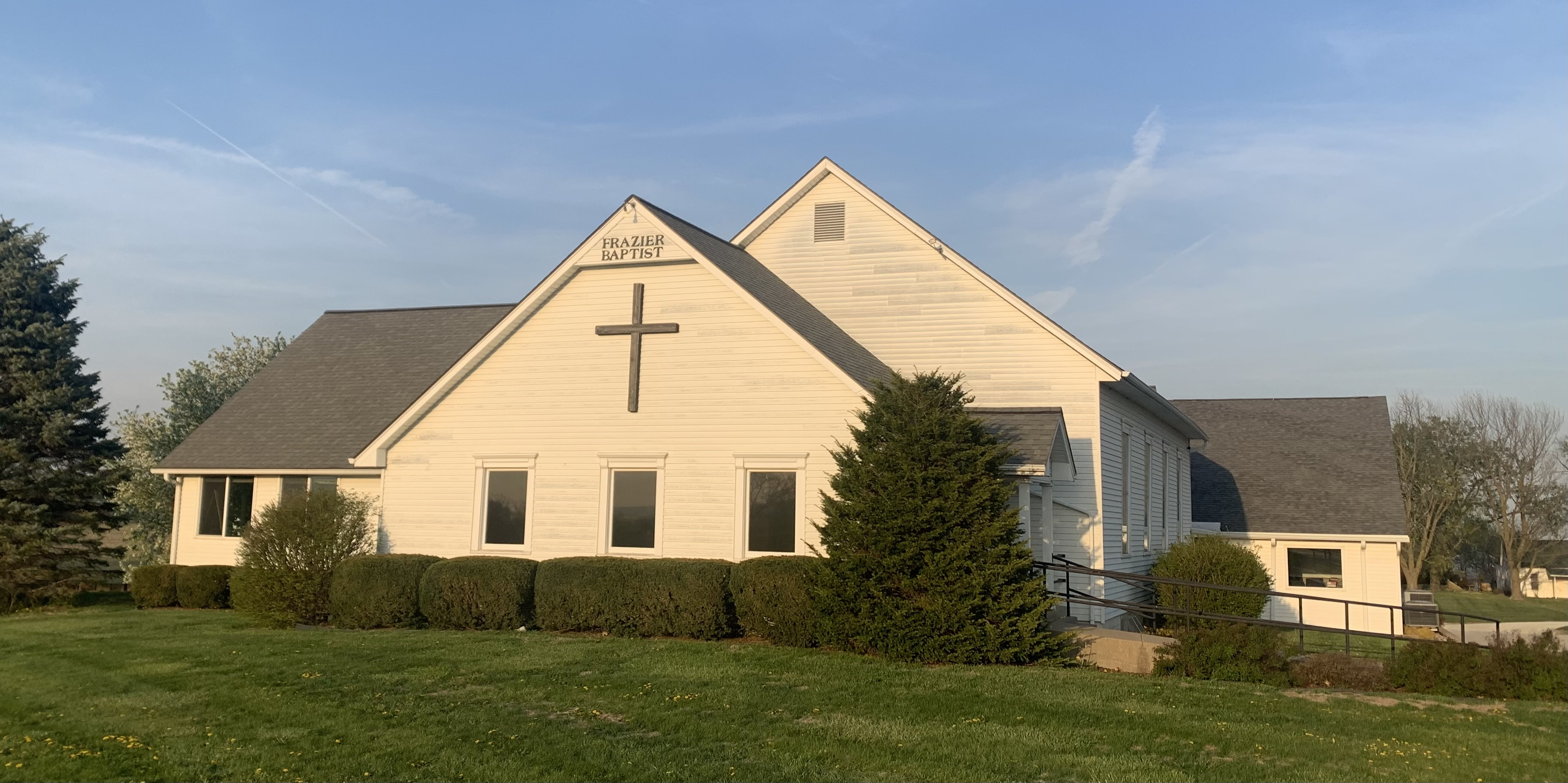
Frazier Baptist Church, April 2025

Frazier (also known as Frazer) is an unincorporated community in Buchanan County, Missouri, United States.

== History ==
A post office called Frazer was established in 1871, and remained in operation until 1936. The community has the name of a local family.
