= Easton, Missouri =

Cities in Buchanan County, Missouri, United States

- City
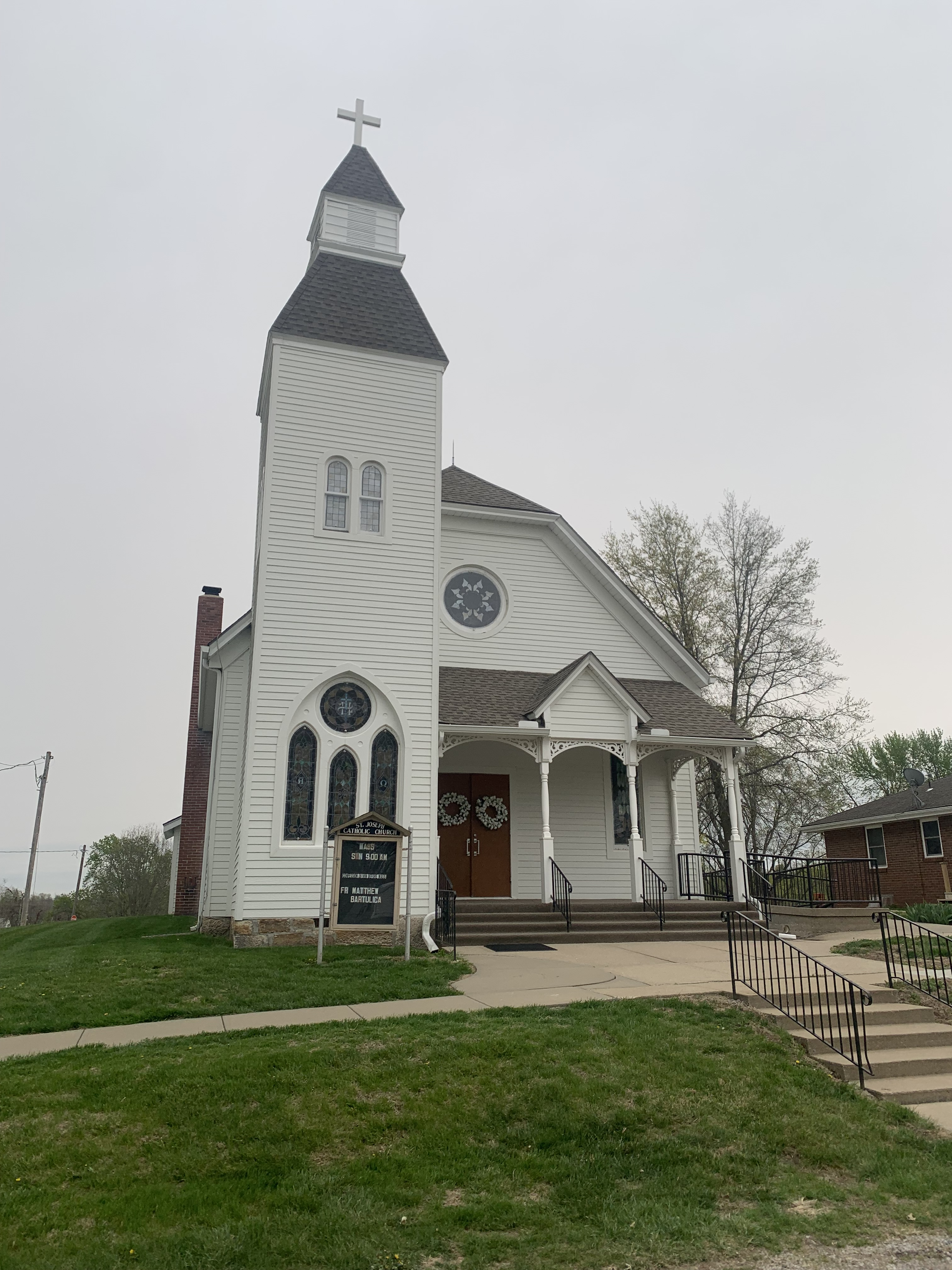
- St. Joseph Catholic Church in Easton, April 2025

- Location of Easton, Missouri

- Location within Missouri Location within the United States
- Coordinates: 39°43′21″N 94°38′25″W
- Country: United States
- State: Missouri
- County: Buchanan
- Township: Marion

Government
  - Mayor: Michael Kerns

Area
  - Total: 0.59 sq mi (1.53 km^{2})
  - Land: 0.59 sq mi (1.53 km^{2})
  - Water: 0 sq mi (0.00 km^{2})
- Elevation: 938 ft (286 m)

Population (2020)
  - Total: 227
  - Density: 385.2/sq mi (148.71/km^{2})
- Time zone: UTC−6 (Central (CST))
  - Summer (DST): UTC−5 (CDT)
- ZIP Code: 64443
- Area code: 816
- FIPS code: 29-21034
- GNIS feature ID: 2394610

Easton is a city in Buchanan County, Missouri, United States. The population was 227 at the 2020 census. It is part of the St. Joseph, MO–KS Metropolitan Statistical Area.

== History ==
Easton was platted in 1854. The name Easton may be directional, for the community lies east of St. Joseph. A post office called Easton has been in operation since 1855.

== Geography ==
According to the United States Census Bureau, the city has a total area of 0.58 square miles (1.50 km^{2}), all of it land. State Highway 31 runs North/South through the center of town and is used primarily as a link between US Hwy 36 to the North and US Hwy 169 to the South.

== Demographics ==
Historical population
Census	Pop.	Note	%±
1870	318		—
1880	201		−36.8%
1890	218		8.5%
1900	227		4.1%
1910	225		−0.9%
1920	206		−8.4%
1930	214		3.9%
1940	203		−5.1%
1950	173		−14.8%
1960	198		14.5%
1970	183		−7.6%
1980	313		71.0%
1990	232		−25.9%
2000	258		11.2%
2010	234		−9.3%
2020	227		−3.0%
U.S. Decennial Census

=== 2010 census ===
As of the census of 2010, there were 234 people, 103 households, and 67 families residing in the city. The population density was 403.4 inhabitants per square mile (155.8/km^{2}). There were 110 housing units at an average density of 189.7 per square mile (73.2/km^{2}). The racial makeup of the city was 95.3% White, 1.3% Native American, 0.4% Asian, and 3.0% from two or more races. Hispanic or Latino of any race were 4.7% of the population.

There were 103 households, of which 25.2% had children under the age of 18 living with them, 49.5% were married couples living together, 10.7% had a female householder with no husband present, 4.9% had a male householder with no wife present, and 35.0% were non-families. 34.0% of all households were made up of individuals, and 13.6% had someone living alone who was 65 years of age or older. The average household size was 2.27 and the average family size was 2.90.

The median age in the city was 45.7 years. 16.7% of residents were under the age of 18; 12.8% were between the ages of 18 and 24; 18.3% were from 25 to 44; 37.2% were from 45 to 64; and 15% were 65 years of age or older. The gender makeup of the city was 49.6% male and 50.4% female.

=== 2000 census ===
As of the census of 2000, there were 258 people, 104 households, and 66 families residing in the city. The population density was 426.3 inhabitants per square mile (164.6/km^{2}). There were 107 housing units at an average density of 176.8 per square mile (68.3/km^{2}). The racial makeup of the city was 93.80% White, 0.39% Native American, 0.39% Asian, and 5.43% from two or more races. Hispanic or Latino of any race were 3.88% of the population.

There were 104 households, out of which 37.5% had children under the age of 18 living with them, 51.9% were married couples living together, 7.7% had a female householder with no husband present, and 36.5% were non-families. 34.6% of all households were made up of individuals, and 14.4% had someone living alone who was 65 years of age or older. The average household size was 2.48 and the average family size was 3.26.

In the city the population was spread out, with 29.5% under the age of 18, 5.0% from 18 to 24, 30.6% from 25 to 44, 24.0% from 45 to 64, and 10.9% who were 65 years of age or older. The median age was 36 years. For every 100 females, there were 95.5 males. For every 100 females age 18 and over, there were 97.8 males.

The median income for a household in the city was $45,750, and the median income for a family was $50,000. Males had a median income of $33,125 versus $21,250 for females. The per capita income for the city was $14,865. About 4.8% of families and 4.8% of the population were below the poverty line, including 5.5% of those under the age of eighteen and none of those 65 or over.

== Education ==
The school district is East Buchanan County C-1 School District.

== Notable people ==
Easton is the birthplace of college basketball coach Henry Iba, who coached Oklahoma State (then known as Oklahoma A&M) to consecutive NCAA titles in 1945 and 1946, becoming the first two-time winning coach in the NCAA tournament.

Professional fisherman and host of the television show Championship Fishing Virgil Ward was born in Easton, MO.

== See also ==
- List of cities in Missouri
