= Charles S. L. Baker =

American inventor of the friction heater

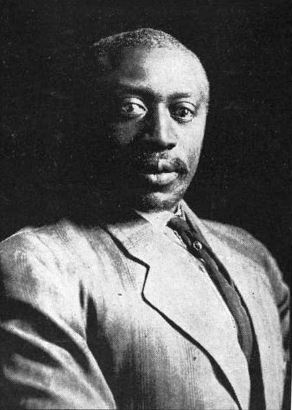
- Baker in 1911
- Born: August 3, 1859; Savannah, Missouri
- Died: May 5, 1926 (aged 66); St. Joseph, Missouri
- Occupations: Inventor, engineer
- Years active: 67 years
- Known for: Friction heater

Charles S. Lewis Baker (August 3, 1859 – May 5, 1926) was an American inventor who patented the friction heater.

== Biography ==
=== Early life ===
Baker was born into slavery on August 3, 1859, in Savannah, Missouri. His mother, Betsy Mackay, died when he was three months old, leaving him to be brought up by the wife of his owner, Sallie Mackay, and his father, Abraham Baker. He was the youngest of five children, Susie, Peter, Annie, and Ellen, all of whom were freed after the Civil War. Baker later received an education at Franklin College. His father was employed as an express agent, and once Baker turned fifteen, he became his assistant. Baker worked with wagons and linchpins, which sparked an interest in mechanical sciences.

=== Invention ===
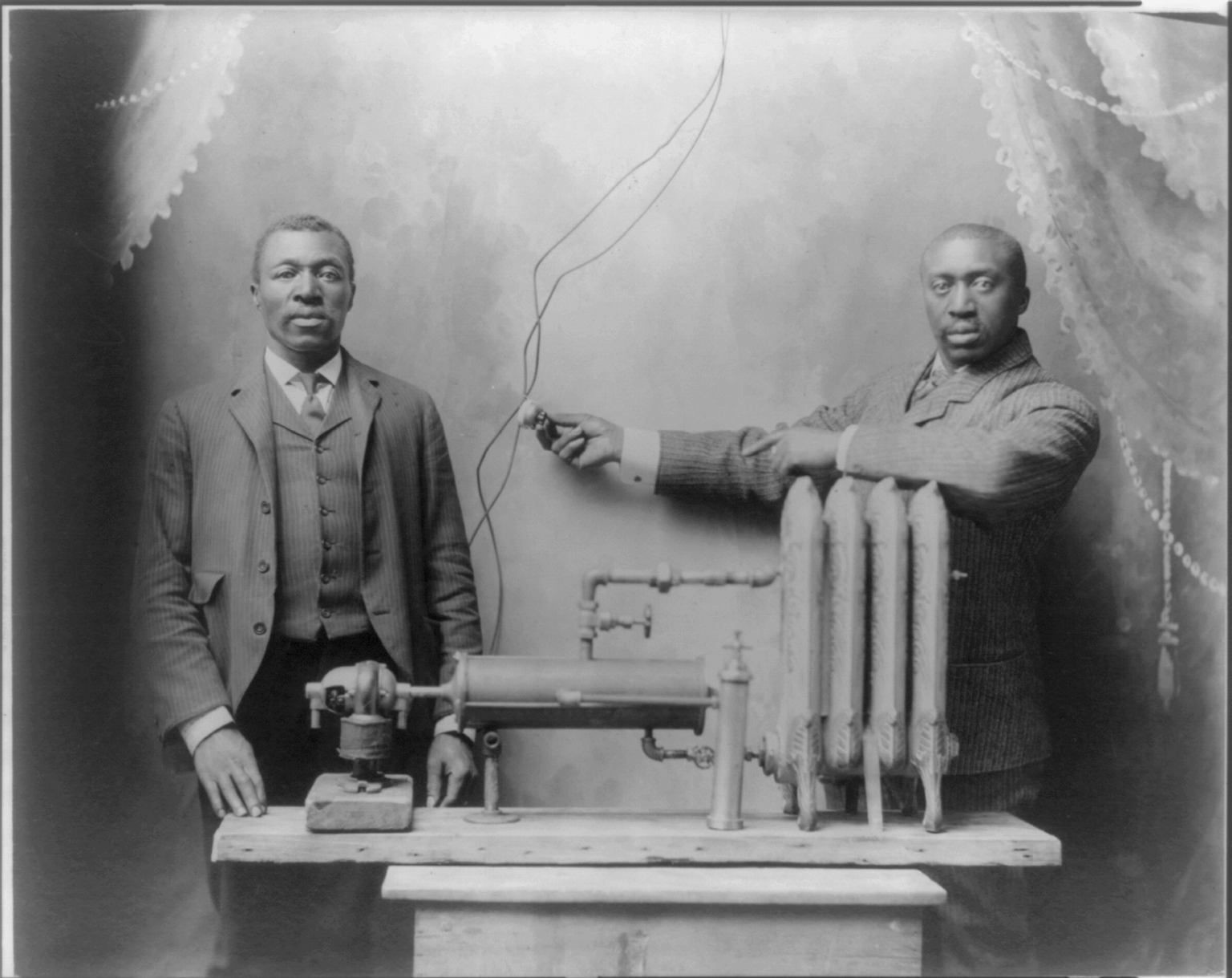
Charles S. L. Baker and his assistant demonstrating a heating/radiator system

Baker worked over the span of decades on his product, attempting several different forms of friction, including rubbing two bricks together mechanically, as well as using various types of metals. After twenty-three years, the invention was perfected in the form of two metal cylinders, one inside of the other, with a spinning core in the center made of wood, that produced the friction. Baker started a business with several other men to manufacture the heater. The Friction Heat & Boiler Company was established in 1904, in St. Joseph, with Baker on the board of directors. The company worked up to $136,000 in capital, equal to nearly $4 million in 2018.

Mr. Baker claims that the particular mode of power used in creating the friction is not essential. It may be wind, water, gasoline, or any other source of energy. The most difficult part of the inventor's assertions to prove is that his system will light or heat a house at about half the cost of methods now in use.

=== Death ===
Baker died of pneumonia on May 5, 1926, in St. Joseph, Missouri.

== Personal life ==
At 21, Baker married 19-year-old Carrie Carriger on December 12, 1880, in Adams County, Iowa. They had one child, born on January 3, 1882, named Lulu Belle Baker.

== See also ==
- Garrett Morgan
- Elijah McCoy
- Granville Woods
