= Forrest E. Peden =

U.S. Army Medal of Honor recipient (1913–1945)

- Born: October 3, 1913; Saint Joseph, Missouri, US
- Died: February 3, 1945 (aged 31) near Biesheim, France
- Burial place: Mount Olive Cemetery, Troy, Kansas
- Military career
- Allegiance: United States of America
- Branch: United States Army
- Service years: 1943–1945
- Rank: Technician Fifth Grade
- Units: 10th Field Artillery Battalion, 3rd Infantry Division
- Conflicts: World War II
- Awards: Medal of Honor

Forrest E. Peden (October 3, 1913 – February 3, 1945) was a United States Army soldier and a recipient of the United States military's highest decoration—the Medal of Honor—for his actions in World War II.

== Biography ==
Peden joined the Army from Wathena, Kansas in February 1943, and by February 3, 1945, was serving as a technician fifth grade in Battery C, 10th Field Artillery Battalion, 3rd Infantry Division. On that day, near Biesheim, France, his unit was ambushed by a larger enemy force. After giving medical aid to two wounded soldiers, Peden ran for help despite intense enemy fire. He found a friendly tank and guided it to the ambush site, but was killed when the tank was hit by hostile fire. He was posthumously awarded the Medal of Honor a year later, on February 13, 1946.

Aged 31 at his death, Peden was buried at Mount Olive Cemetery in Troy, Kansas.

== Medal of Honor citation ==
Technician Peden's official Medal of Honor citation reads:

He was a forward artillery observer when the group of about 45 infantrymen with whom he was advancing was ambushed in the uncertain light of a waning moon. Enemy forces outnumbering the Americans by 4 to 1 poured withering artillery, mortar, machinegun, and small-arms fire into the stricken unit from the flanks, forcing our men to seek the cover of a ditch which they found already occupied by enemy foot troops. As the opposing infantrymen struggled in hand-to-hand combat, Technician Peden courageously went to the assistance of 2 wounded soldiers and rendered first aid under heavy fire. With radio communications inoperative, he realized that the unit would be wiped out unless help could be secured from the rear. On his own initiative, he ran 800 yards to the battalion command post through a hail of bullets which pierced his jacket and there secured 2 light tanks to go to the relief of his hard-pressed comrades. Knowing the terrible risk involved, he climbed upon the hull of the lead tank and guided it into battle. Through a murderous concentration of fire the tank lumbered onward, bullets and shell fragments ricocheting from its steel armor within inches of the completely exposed rider, until it reached the ditch. As it was about to go into action it was turned into a flaming pyre by a direct hit which killed Technician Peden. However, his intrepidity and gallant sacrifice was not in vain. Attracted by the light from the burning tank, reinforcements found the beleaguered Americans and drove off the enemy.

== Awards and decorations ==

| 1st row | Medal of Honor | Purple Heart | Army Good Conduct Medal |
| 2nd row | American Campaign Medal | European–African–Middle Eastern Campaign Medal with 1 Campaign star | World War II Victory Medal |

== Trivia ==
In Wertheim am Main from 1952 until 1994 the US barracks were named after Forrest E. Peden. Today a street in the former area still carries his name.

== See also ==
- List of Medal of Honor recipients for World War II
