= Anthony Glise =

American musician

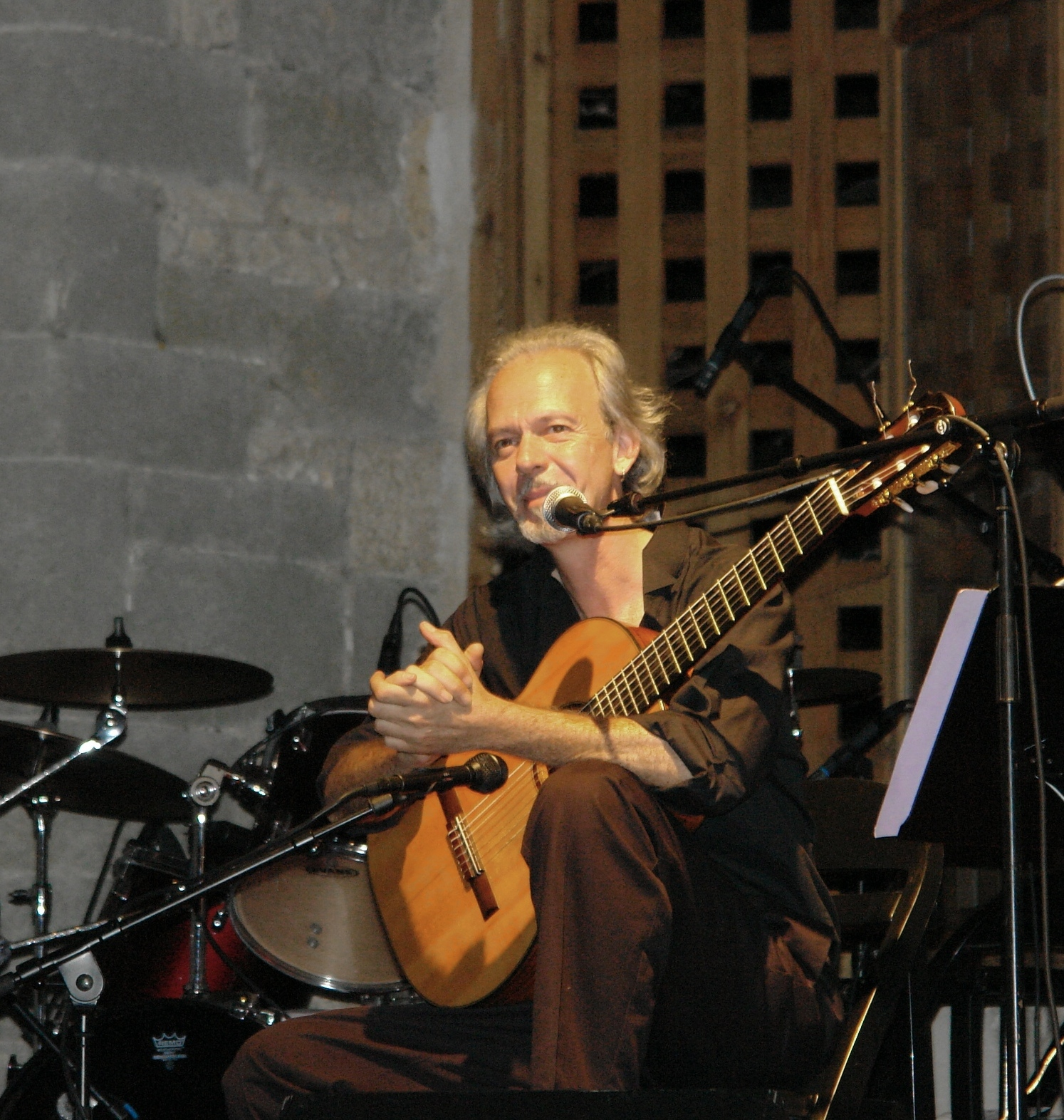
Anthony Glise

Anthony Glise (born January 17, 1956, in St. Joseph, Missouri) is an American guitarist, composer and author. He is the only American guitarist who has won first prize in the International Toscanini Competition held in Italy. He is also the only guitarist to be chosen as "Individual Artist of the Year" by the Missouri State Arts Council.

In 2010 he accepted a professorship at the University of Missouri-Columbia to launch the university's first classical guitar program. The program offers degrees in undergraduate through graduate classical guitar as well as a PhD in Music Education.

== Biography ==
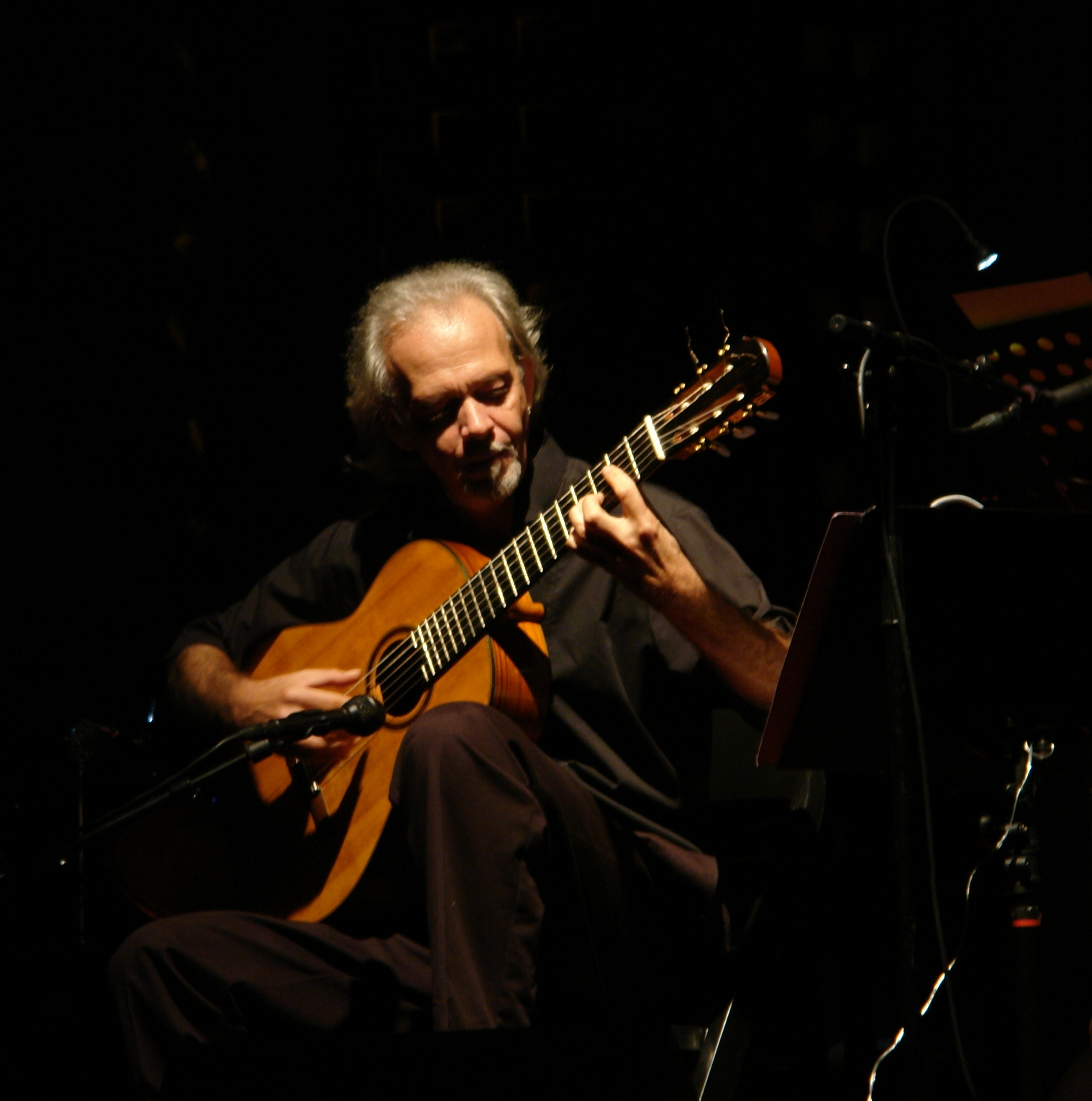
Anthony Glise - Nuits de Hautecombe 2008

Glise's musical training began at a very young age under the tutelage of his mother (a piano teacher) and father (an amateur baritone vocalist). Glise's musical studies continued from that time, and he ultimately matriculated from New England Conservatory of Music (Boston, US, 1983), achieving a Master of Music in Classical Guitar Performance.

While in Boston, he pursued studies in classical guitar, composition, musicology, early music performance practice, and historical dance under Robert Paul Sullivan, Benjamin Zander, and Daniel Pinkham. During this time (1980–83), Glise was also a lutenist and dancer for the Boston historical dance troupe "Terpsichore".

While finishing his degree at New England Conservatory, he simultaneously studied business management and administration at Harvard University (Cambridge, US), and shortly thereafter studied medicine for a brief time, earning a license as an EMT (Emergency Medical Technician).

Following studies in Boston, Glise moved to Vienna, Austria (1983) to study music at the Konservatorium der Stadt Wien (classical guitar performance) and simultaneously at the University of Vienna where he earned a diploma in the German Language.

Glise's other diplomas and awards during this period include matriculation from Lille Catholic University (Lille, France, in French Language and Civilization), ARCUM (Rome, Italy, in 19th-Century Musical Performance Practice) and additional awards from the IX Nemzetkozi Gitarfesztival (Esztergom, Hungary, for musical composition), Ville Sable-sur-Sarthe (France, for musical composition), et al.

After his studies in Vienna, Glise took a teaching post in Nenzing, (in the western Austrian state of Vorarlberg while living in Bludenz), followed by posts and professional activities in Northern France (Lille), in Italy at the "Academy for the Study of 19th-Century Music" (Vigevano) and in Southern Germany (Schwäbisch Gmünd).

From 1989 to 1990, Glise was script writer and host of the first internationally syndicated guitar radio program Glise on Guitar which featured music and personal interviews with some of the world's leading musical figures including Pepe Romero, Sharon Isbin, Christopher Parkening, Paul O'Dette, Sir Neville Marriner, et al. Satellite distribution of that program included the US via PRI (Public Radio International) and Europe, South America and the Far East via AFN (Armed Forces Network).

In 1991 Glise became the only American-born guitarist to win First Prize at the International Toscanini Competition (Italy), with an unprecedented unanimous vote from the competition jury. That competition was held in the town of Stresa on Lake Maggiore, and the ceremonial award concert was performed on the island, Isole dei Pescatori.

More recently, Glise founded and currently directs various music festivals, including the "St. Joseph International Guitar Festival and Competition" (US), "Six Strings and the Spirit" (Chartres, France), sponsored by the Catholic order, Communauté du Chemin Neuf, et al.

He has recorded for a number of international labels including Young Recording Artists, Dorian Recordings (US), CEH (Hungary), and most notably for the French label, Eclipse (a subdivision of The Aevia Group, Ltd.) which Glise took over as acting CEO in the early 1990s.

In addition to over a dozen CDs, DVDs, and over 30 original published compositions, Glise has published many historical and Urtext musical editions for Willis Music Company (Cincinnati, US), under the series, "The Anthony Glise Critical Editions," and a number of books and editions for Mel Bay Publications (Pacific, US), under the series titled "The Anthony Glise Urtext Editions".

Glise lectures at Missouri Western State University in his home town of St. Joseph, Missouri (US) where he teaches guitar, Renaissance lute, guitar pedagogy, guitar history, guitar ensemble, career development, and is a fencing coach (foil) for the university fencing team. Since 1995 he has lived predominantly in the small French Flanders village of Sainghin-en-Melantois on the outskirts of the city of Lille.
