= Eddie Timanus =

American journalist and game show contestant (born 1968)

- Born: August 9, 1968 (age 58); St. Joseph, Missouri, US
- Education: Wake Forest University
- Occupation: Sportswriter
- Employer: USA Today
- Known for: First blind Jeopardy! contestant Five-game Jeopardy! win streak

Eddie Timanus (born August 9, 1968) is a USA Today sportswriter and game show contestant who grew up in Reston, Virginia, then graduated from Wake Forest University. Having been blind since early childhood due to retinoblastoma, he is best known for his five-game winning streak on the game show Jeopardy! and for being the first blind contestant to appear on the show.

== Early life ==
Timanus was born on August 9, 1968, in St. Joseph, Missouri. At age three, he had an operation to remove tumors from his eyes, leading to his blindness. Following his Jeopardy! success, Timanus related a story from his childhood where his mother Terri told him: "I came home and said, 'Turn on the lights.' And she said, 'They're on and you won't see them.' And I said, 'Well, OK' and went on."

Timanus' father, Chuck, was a play-by-play announcer. Timanus began attending sporting events with his father at age six, and Timanus began keeping statistics at age 11. Timanus graduated from Wake Forest University in 1990 with a degree in economics. The following year, The Washington Post reported that Timanus worked alongside Chuck as a stat keeper for American University's basketball games, using pegboards and abaci, compiling statistical information for WINX-AM radio. Terri Timanus was also a Jeopardy! contestant, appearing in 1991 and losing her only game.

== Jeopardy! ==
Timanus was a contestant on Jeopardy!; his games aired in October 1999. Timanus was the first blind contestant to compete on the show. A few changes were made to accommodate Timanus: he received a card with the category names printed in Braille before each round, and a Braille keyboard to type out his name on the podium's computer and his response and wager for Final Jeopardy!. There were no video-based clues during his appearances. Beginning with his appearances, contestants started out the show at their podiums, instead of the old practice of walking up to them as they were introduced. (The practice became permanent in September 2000.) Timanus refused further accommodations.

Timanus won five consecutive games and then, in accordance with the rules in effect at that time, retired undefeated. His winnings totaled US$69,700 plus two new cars (Chevrolet Camaros in his case), and Timanus was invited back for the 2000 Tournament of Champions in Atlanta, Georgia, reaching the semifinals and winning $5,000. The story became a minor media sensation, with Jeopardy!'s Nielsen ratings rising 15 percent for Timanus' fourth and fifth games. Host Alex Trebek received one of six Access Awards from the American Foundation for the Blind in 2001 for his role in accommodating Timanus.

Timanus was a contestant on the Jeopardy! Million Dollar Masters Tournament in New York City which aired in May 2002, but did not advance beyond the quarterfinals and took home $10,000.

Timanus appeared in the Jeopardy! Ultimate Tournament of Champions on March 16, 2005, in a first-round game. He finished in second place, taking home $5,000. In addition to the Braille cards and computer keyboard provided on his earlier appearances, an audible tone that was in sync with the game board's lights was added in order to give him an indication of when he could begin buzzing in to respond.

Timanus participated in the March 3, 2014, episode of the Jeopardy! Battle of the Decades tournament. While he had the most money going into Final Jeopardy! round in which every contestant answered incorrectly, Timanus lost by a margin of $200, finishing in second place behind Rachael Schwartz. As with his Ultimate Tournament of Champions appearance, Timanus was given Braille cards, a computer keyboard, and an audible buzz-in indicator.

== Who Wants to Be a Millionaire ==
In 2000, Timanus acted as a lifeline on Who Wants to Be a Millionaire. On November 26, 2004, he appeared again on Millionaire, this time as a contestant, and won $50,000 in prize money. When Timanus used the phone-a-friend lifeline, host Meredith Vieira would read the question and the four choices to the friend that Timanus chose to call and would also remind him how much time was remaining on the 30 seconds used for that lifeline.

== Sportswriting ==
Timanus is a staff sportswriter for USA Today. His articles appear frequently in the publication. In addition to general reporting, Timanus is responsible for compiling the weekly USA Today Coaches' Poll. He also writes the preview section for college football games.

== Personal life ==
Timanus met his wife, Kelli, through a Yahoo! Groups discussion group on game shows. They have a son named Evan.
