= Seraphine Eppstein Pisko =

American clubwoman and hospital administrator (1861–1942)

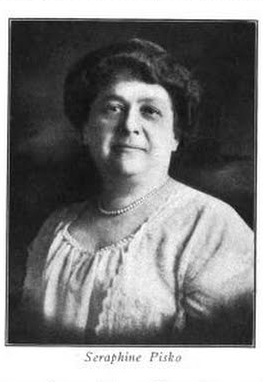
Seraphine Eppstein Pisko, from a 1917 publication.

Seraphine Eppstein Pisko (January 1, 1861 – July 27, 1942) was an American clubwoman and hospital administrator based in Denver, Colorado.

== Early life ==
Seraphine Eppstein was born in St. Joseph, Missouri. Her parents were Max Eppstein and Bertha Eppstein. She moved to Denver with her parents and five younger siblings in 1875.

== Career ==
From 1893 to 1901, Pisko served as president of the Hebrew Ladies Benevolent Society (also known as the Jewish Charities Association, and the Jewish Relief Society) in Denver, as her mother had been before her. She represented Denver at the national Conference of Jewish Charities meeting, and at the National Conference of Charities and Correction in Ohio in 1899. She helped to organize the Denver Jewish Settlement Home, and worked for free kindergarten for immigrant children. She wrote to national Jewish publications about women's suffrage from the perspective of Colorado women, explaining, "In Colorado we have had the enfranchisement of women for twenty-three years and I know of no homes that have been broken up on account of this." She represented the National Council of Women at the International Congress of Women in the Hague in 1922, and continued active on international women's issues.

She was president of the Denver chapter of the National Council of Jewish Women (NCJW). In 1911 she became executive secretary of the National Jewish Hospital for Consumptives in Denver; she had been, since its founding, a successful traveling fundraiser for the hospital. During her tenure the hospital established a research department. She retired from that work in 1938. A wing of the hospital was named for her in 1925.

== Personal life ==
Seraphine Eppstein married Edward Pisko in 1878, when she was seventeen years old. Her husband was born in Austria, and was a leader in the Jewish community in Denver. He also served in the Colorado state legislature. Seraphine Eppstein Pisko was widowed in 1891, when she was thirty. She died in 1942, aged 81 years.

Some of her papers are archived at the University of Denver.
