= Tremont Township, Buchanan County, Missouri =

Township in Buchanan County, Missouri, U.S.

Tremont Township
- Township
- Coordinates: 39°39′02″N 94°39′27″W
- Country: United States
- State: Missouri
- County: Buchanan

Area
  - Total: 35.8 sq mi (93 km^{2})
  - Land: 35.46 sq mi (91.8 km^{2})
  - Water: 0.34 sq mi (0.88 km^{2}) 0.95%
- Elevation: 961 ft (293 m)

Population (2020)
  - Total: 731
  - Density: 20.6/sq mi (8.0/km^{2})
- FIPS code: 29-02173798
- GNIS feature ID: 766345

Tremont Township is a township in Buchanan County, Missouri, United States. At the 2020 census, its population was 731.

Tremont Township was established in 1839.

== Geography ==
Tremont Township covers an area of 36.63 square miles (94.9 km^{2}) and contains no incorporated settlements. It contains two cemeteries: Bretz and New Harmony.

The stream of Riley Branch runs through this township.

== Transportation ==
The following highways travel through the township:

- U.S. Route 169
- Route 31
- Route E
- Route H
- Route NN
- Route T
- Route VV
