= Frank Posegate =

American politician

Mayor of St. Joseph, Missouri
- In office 1882–1884

Personal details
- Born: 1838 Lafayette, Indiana, U.S.
- Died: 1917 (aged 78–79) St. Louis, Missouri, U.S.

Military service
- Allegiance: Union Army
- Years of service: 1861–June 25, 1863
- Rank: Captain
- Unit: 48th Ohio, Company A
- Battles/wars: American Civil War; Siege of Vicksburg

Francis Marion Posegate (1838–1917), American Civil War soldier, journalist, and mayor of St. Joseph, Missouri from 1882 to 1884.

== Early life ==
Francis, or Frank, Posegate was born in Lafayette, Indiana, in Tippecanoe County on October 11, 1837. He was raised in "Little Dixie" in the Missouri and Iowa frontier. His family lived along the Missouri River in Liberty and Boonville, Missouri. Frank's father, Isaac Posegate, was born in Virginia and raised in Fairfield Township, Highland County Ohio. Although his family was Quaker and pacifist, Isaac named his two sons, Francis Marion and Winfield Scott after generals. The Posegate family moved to Fort Des Moines, Iowa for a time, where Frank worked for Lamson Sherman, the brother of General Sherman, as a carrier and printers "devil" for the Iowa Star. When Frank was 13, the family moved to St. Joseph, Missouri. Isaac found work there as a gunsmith.

== Newspaper career ==
In St. Joseph, Posegate started working in the printing business, at the office of the Adventurer. He continued in this line of work, eventually opening the first job printing office in St. Joseph with James A. Millan in 1856. After a year and a half, Posegate sold his part of the business so he could publish a newspaper, The West, first published on May 1, 1858.

The paper was published in a town on the border of Missouri and Kansas, where Posegate's extreme nationalist political views were not well received. Posegate's partners in The West were Washington Jones and Edward Y. Shield.

The West became a daily paper in 1859. Posegate was firmly in support of the Union on the topic of secession, but was also against abolitionist views of another paper, the Free Democrat. Posegate bought out his partners and became the sole owner of The West in February 1860. He sold the paper a short time later, in August of that year, to James Tracey & Co. The printing appliances were sold to Colonel C.B. Wilkinson, who started a Republican paper, the St. Joseph Morning Herald.

After the sale of The West, Posegate moved to Memphis and worked as a printer. He was employed at the Eagle and Enquirer. However, his Unionist views were controversial in the south and Posegate moved back to Ohio a few days before the presidential election. Posegate eventually returned to St. Joseph, in 1867, and took over management of the Herald. For the first two years, Posegate was business manager for Wilkinson & Bittinger, and then bought John L. Bittinger's share of the company and became a partner. A year later, in 1869, Wilkinson & Posegate sold the paper to Hallowell & Bittinger.

Posegate started The St. Joseph Steam Printing Company on June 1, 1870. He ran the business during the 1870s and 1880s. In 1891, The St. Joseph Steam Printing Company was absorbed by the Posegate Printing and Lithographing Company with Frank Posegate as president and J.W. Johnson secretary and treasurer.

== Military career ==
Posegate settled at his in-laws' home in Ohio, after moving from Memphis, and enlisted in the 48th Ohio, Company A. He also helped recruit for the volunteer infantry.

Frank Posegate, then 22 years old, is credited as the likely author for the first hand account of the start of the Pony Express ride that appeared in the paper of a former sailor named Richardson on a fine bay mare marking the beginning of the Pony Express 7:15, April 3, 1860.

In 1861 he enlisted as a private in Ohio and promoted to 2nd lieutenant on September 18, 1861. On January 23, 1862, Posegate was promoted to 1st lieutenant. He was promoted to Captain on September 6, 1862. Among his written work is The Sunday Battle at Shiloh, a first hand eyewitness at the Battle of Shiloh.

Posegate fought in the Siege of Vicksburg, after which he resigned his post on June 25, 1863, claiming bad eyesight. His resignation letter in the National Archives is accompanied by a surgeon's certificate verifying the deterioration of Posegate's eyesight and his inability to fulfill his duties because of his vision. However, in September 1864, Posegate helped to organize the 175th Ohio and became a conditional second lieutenant in that outfit.

== Political career ==
On December 12, 1877, Posegate was appointed the twenty-second Postmaster of St. Joseph, Missouri by President Hays. He held this position until June 15, 1881.

Posegate served as Mayor for St. Joseph between 1882 and 1884.

== Personal life ==
In 1858, Posegate married his first wife, Sarah (Sallie) Johnson from New Lexington, Highland County, Ohio. Sarah was the daughter of a well to do Ohio farmer and merchant. They were married on September 6, 1858. Sarah died on July 23, 1878. The couple had two daughters, Kate, who went on to marry Robert Hughart, and Mamie.

Five years after Posegate's first wife died, he married Emma Cushman, from New Hampshire. The two moved to Kirkwood, California in 1890s, but returned to Missouri where Posegate became editor of the St. Louis Star.

Posegate died on January 19, 1917, and is buried in Jefferson Barracks National Cemetery in St. Louis.
