= List of census-designated places in Kansas by population =

Map of the United States with Kansas highlighted

Kansas is a state located in the Midwestern United States that is divided into 105 counties and contains 44 census-designated places (CDPs). All population data is based on the 2010 census.

== Census-designated places ==
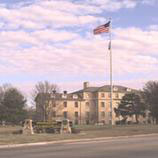
Fort Riley garrison headquarters

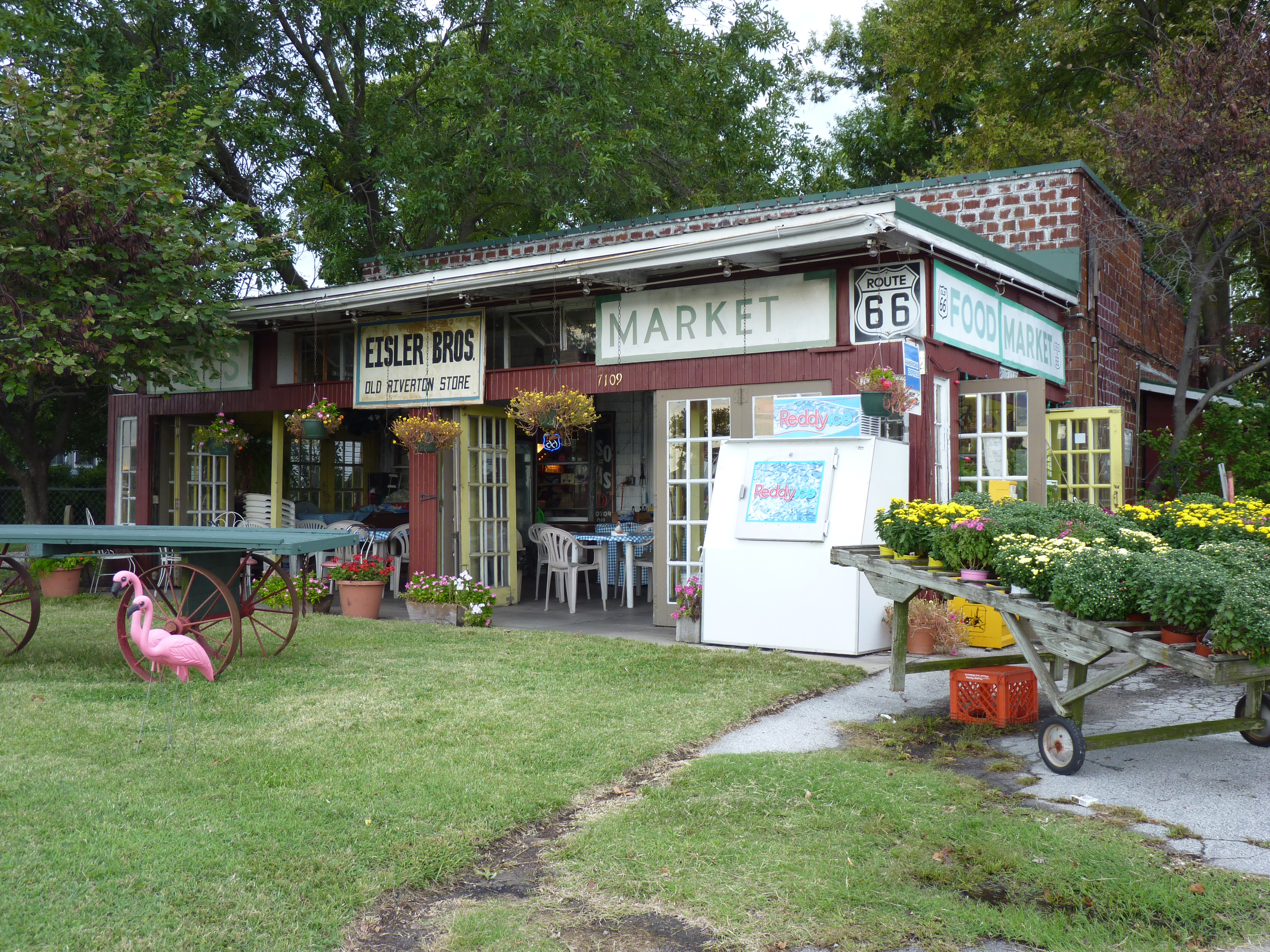
Eisler Bros. Old Riverton Store in Riverton

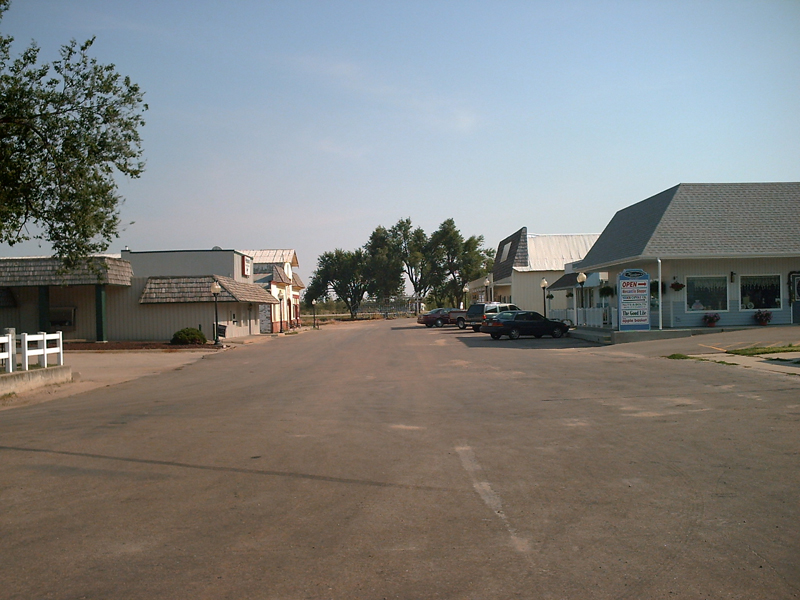
Main Street in Yoder

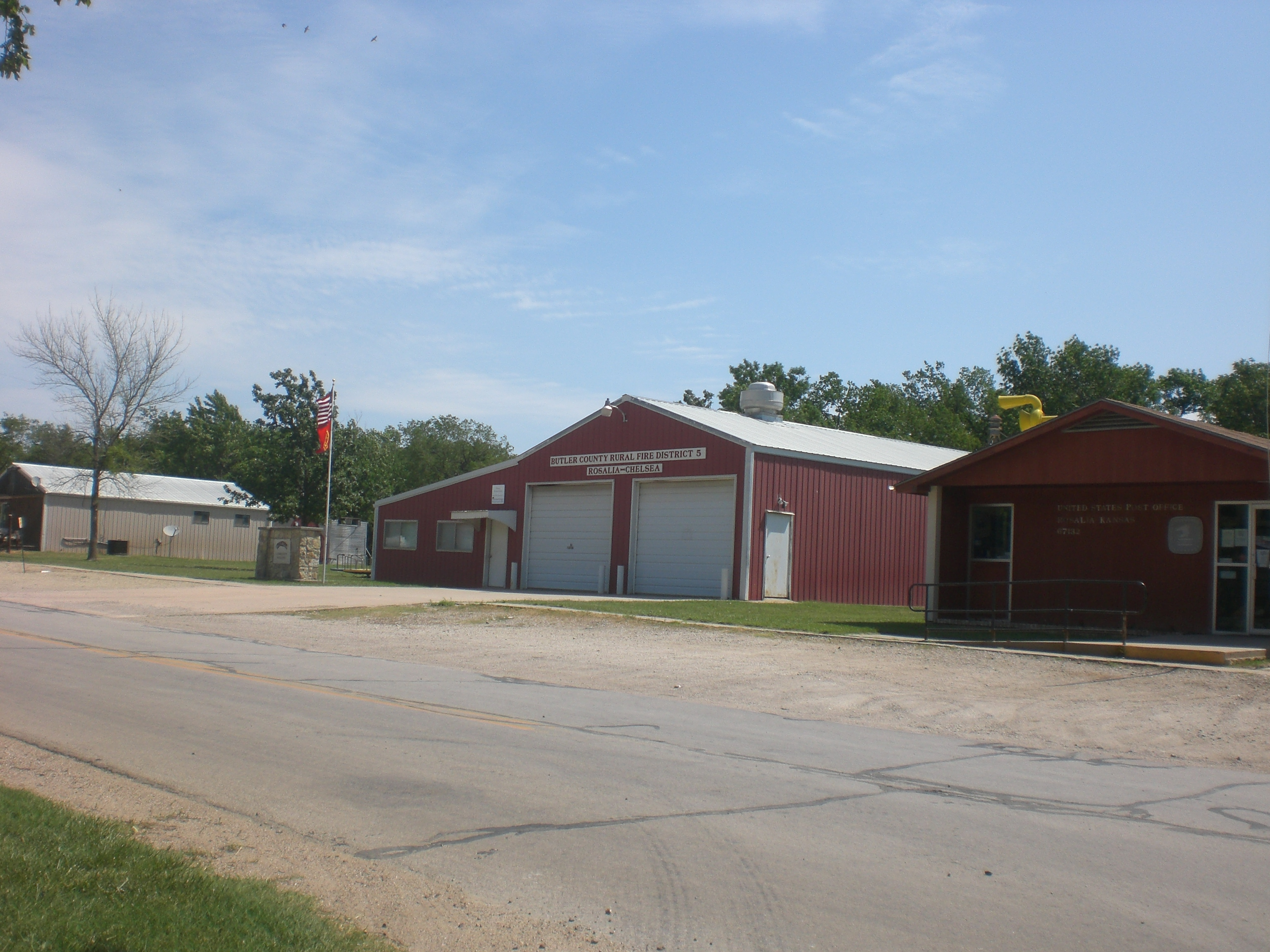
Rosalia's main street

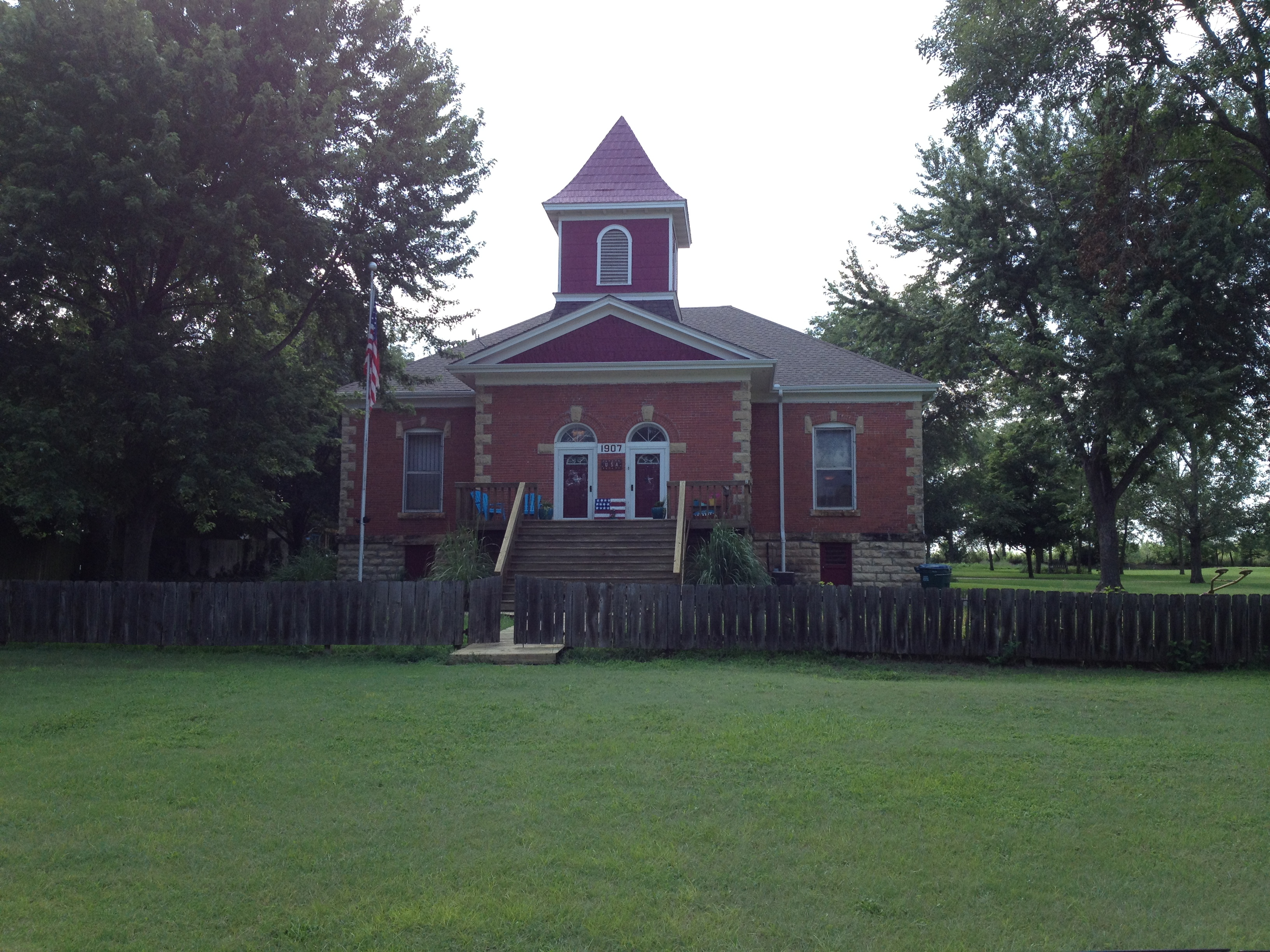
Old Detroit school house

Name	County	Population (2010)	Land area	
Name	County	Population (2010)	sq mi	km^{2}
Fort Riley	Geary and Riley	7,761	5.04	13.1
Oaklawn-Sunview	Sedgwick	3,276	0.54	1.4
McConnell AFB	Sedgwick	1,777	4.15	10.7
Riverton	Cherokee	929	2.24	5.8
Wilroads Gardens	Ford	609	2.25	5.8
Vassar	Osage	530	4.86	12.6
Chicopee	Crawford	408	3.16	8.2
Franklin	Crawford	375	1.71	4.4
Lowell	Cherokee	283	0.31	0.80
Wakarusa	Shawnee	260	4.97	12.9
Healy	Lane	234	3.46	9.0
Hillsdale	Miami	229	1.53	4.0
Munjor	Ellis	213	2.30	6.0
Kickapoo Tribal Center	Brown	194	1.93	5.0
Yoder	Reno	194	2.70	7.0
Bucyrus	Miami	193	2.00	5.2
Baileyville	Nemaha	181	3.99	10.3
Grantville	Jefferson	180	1.95	5.1
Rosalia	Butler	171	1.27	3.3
Fort Dodge	Ford	165	0.18	0.47
Wright	Ford	163	2.06	5.3
Weskan	Wallace	161	2.64	6.8
Home	Marshall	160	3.96	10.3
Milton	Sumner	155	4.44	11.5
Welda	Anderson	129	0.93	2.4
Bendena	Doniphan	117	1.53	4.0
Detroit	Dickinson	114	0.34	0.88
Piqua	Woodson	107	3.97	10.3
Catharine	Ellis	104	1.77	4.6
Roxbury	McPherson	104	4.03	10.4
Kickapoo Site 1	Brown	101	0.50	1.3
Odin	Barton	101	4.00	10.4
Ada	Ottawa	100	2.54	6.6
Talmage	Dickinson	99	0.10	0.26
Falun	Saline	87	1.11	2.9
Marienthal	Wichita	71	2.00	5.2
Kickapoo Site 5	Brown	66	0.75	1.9
Kickapoo Site 7	Brown	66	0.51	1.3
Levant	Thomas	61	1.01	2.6
Kipp	Saline	59	0.81	2.1
Harris	Anderson	51	0.35	0.91
Kickapoo Site 2	Brown	34	0.85	2.2
Asherville	Mitchell	28	1.18	3.1
Kickapoo Site 6	Brown	15	0.31	0.80

== See also ==
- List of counties in Kansas
- List of census-designated places in Kansas
