= List of census-designated places in Kansas =

US unincorporated communities

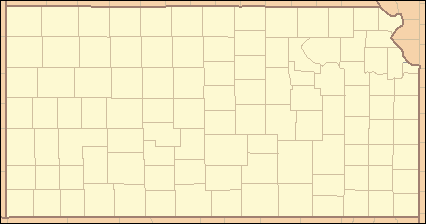

Map of the United States with Kansas highlighted

The United States Census Bureau defines census-designated places as unincorporated communities lacking elected municipal officers and boundaries with legal status.

As of the 2020 census, Kansas has 114 census-designated places, up from 44 in the 2010 census. While most CDPs in Kansas are small, rural communities, there are also a handful of CDPs included in this list that are inside of Indian Reservations, as well as some military bases. A total of 26,153 people live in Kansas' CDPs, or 0.89% of the population.

== Census-designated places ==
Name	County	Population (2020)	Area (2020)		Coordinates
Name	County	Population (2020)	sq mi	km^{2}	Coordinates
Ada	Ottawa	86	2.541	6.6	39°09′44″N 97°53′09″W
Ames	Cloud	33	0.426	1.1	39°34′08″N 97°27′03″W
Asherville	Mitchell	19	1.175	3.0	39°24′27″N 97°58′24″W
Baileyville	Nemaha	182	1.213	3.1	39°51′00″N 96°11′34″W
Bala	Riley	29	0.429	1.1	39°18′39″N 96°57′01″W
Bavaria	Saline	60	0.228	0.6	38°47′43″N 97°45′17″W
Beaumont	Butler	36	0.561	1.5	37°39′22″N 96°31′55″W
Beaver	Barton	52	6.114	15.8	38°38′44″N 98°40′25″W
Bendena	Doniphan	117	1.53	4.0	39°44′37″N 95°10′52″W
Big Bow	Stanton	32	5.032	13.0	37°33′39″N 101°33′27″W
Bremen	Marshall	51	1.692	4.4	39°53′52″N 96°47′44″W
Bridgeport	Saline	64	0.208	0.5	38°37′38″N 97°36′50″W
Bucyrus	Miami	171	2	5.2	38°43′15″N 94°42′30″W
Burdick	Morris	62	1.006	2.6	38°33′32″N 96°50′50″W
Catharine	Ellis	113	1.77	4.6	38°55′49″N 99°12′52″W
Centerville	Linn	78	1.855	4.8	38°13′47″N 95°00′56″W
Centropolis	Franklin	100	0.335	0.9	38°43′10″N 95°20′58″W
Chicopee	Crawford	422	3.205	8.3	37°23′00″N 94°44′36″W
Codell	Rooks	49	0.752	1.9	39°11′43″N 99°10′12″W
Crestline	Cherokee	116	1.781	4.6	37°10′12″N 94°42′23″W
Croweburg	Crawford	92	0.591	1.5	37°33′13″N 94°40′20″W
Dennis	Labette	152	1.507	3.9	37°20′55″N 95°24′11″W
Detroit	Dickinson	102	0.49	1.3	38°56′10″N 97°07′37″W
Devon	Bourbon	71	0.712	1.8	37°55′20″N 94°48′55″W
Eastshore	Marion	92	1.007	2.6	38°23′04″N 97°03′59″W
Edson	Sherman	17	0.704	1.8	39°20′06″N 101°32′58″W
Elyria	McPherson	120	4.779	12.4	38°17′22″N 97°38′02″W
Falun	Saline	83	1.109	2.9	38°40′28″N 97°45′04″W
Farlington	Crawford	68	0.918	2.4	37°36′55″N 94°49′22″W
Fort Dodge	Ford	97	0.183	0.5	37°43′49″N 99°56′13″W
Fort Riley	Geary	9,230	6.425	16.6	39°06′23″N 96°48′45″W
Franklin	Crawford	473	1.71	4.4	37°31′12″N 94°41′47″W
Furley	Sedgwick	39	0.247	0.6	37°52′48″N 97°12′43″W
Garland	Bourbon	31	0.214	0.6	37°43′50″N 94°37′28″W
Grantville	Jefferson	182	0.613	1.6	39°04′50″N 95°33′40″W
Greenwich	Sedgwick	64	0.127	0.3	37°47′00″N 97°12′11″W
Hallowell	Cherokee	101	0.864	2.2	37°10′24″N 95°00′10″W
Harris	Anderson	47	0.363	0.9	38°19′15″N 95°26′51″W
Healy	Lane	195	3.46	9.0	38°36′11″N 100°37′03″W
Herkimer	Marshall	54	0.938	2.4	39°53′33″N 96°42′32″W
Hillsdale	Miami	247	1.533	4.0	38°39′41″N 94°51′25″W
Home	Marshall	154	3.968	10.3	39°50′28″N 96°31′10″W
Idana	Clay	54	0.338	0.9	39°21′41″N 97°15′59″W
Ionia	Jewell	17	0.974	2.5	39°39′45″N 98°20′38″W
Keats	Riley	96	0.461	1.2	39°13′00″N 96°42′27″W
Kelly	Nemaha	27	0.241	0.6	39°44′13″N 96°00′03″W
Kickapoo Site 1	Brown	110	0.501	1.3	39°42′52″N 95°38′54″W
Kickapoo Site 2	Brown	27	0.854	2.2	39°42′11″N 95°38′58″W
Kickapoo Site 5	Brown	59	0.749	1.9	39°40′25″N 95°41′03″W
Kickapoo Site 6	Brown	13	0.311	0.8	39°41′30″N 95°41′26″W
Kickapoo Site 7	Brown	104	0.507	1.3	39°41′22″N 95°40′17″W
Kickapoo Tribal Center	Brown	177	1.935	5.0	39°40′20″N 95°38′43″W
Kipp	Saline	60	0.806	2.1	38°47′06″N 97°27′25″W
Lafontaine	Wilson	58	1.997	5.2	37°23′59″N 95°50′33″W
Lake City	Barber	47	2.404	6.2	37°21′25″N 98°49′40″W
Levant	Thomas	68	1.009	2.6	39°23′17″N 101°11′41″W
Lowell	Cherokee	244	0.332	0.9	37°03′05″N 94°42′10″W
Ludell	Rawlins	41	0.377	1.0	39°51′24″N 100°57′30″W
McConnell AFB	Sedgwick	1,636	4.153	10.8	37°38′04″N 97°15′31″W
Marienthal	Wichita	64	2	5.2	38°29′21″N 101°13′12″W
Mentor	Saline	101	0.387	1.0	38°44′26″N 97°35′53″W
Mildred	Allen	25	0.688	1.8	38°01′27″N 95°10′20″W
Milton	Sumner	55	4.441	11.5	37°26′36″N 97°46′10″W
Mont Ida	Anderson	23	0.241	0.6	38°13′01″N 95°21′50″W
Monument	Logan	56	0.537	1.4	39°06′18″N 101°00′29″W
Munjor	Ellis	232	2.305	6.0	38°48′32″N 99°16′03″W
Murdock	Kingman	37	0.23	0.6	37°36′40″N 97°55′54″W
Navarre	Dickinson	52	1.652	4.3	38°48′06″N 97°06′27″W
Neal	Greenwood	37	0.201	0.5	37°50′02″N 96°04′51″W
Newbury	Wabaunsee	78	0.899	2.3	39°04′57″N 96°10′27″W
New Salem	Cowley	58	0.367	1.0	37°18′51″N 96°53′23″W
Nicodemus	Graham	14	0.88	2.3	39°23′10″N 99°36′49″W
Niles	Ottawa	56	0.457	1.2	38°58′08″N 97°27′27″W
Norway	Republic	17	2.265	5.9	39°41′48″N 97°46′26″W
Oaklawn-Sunview	Sedgwick	2,880	0.537	1.4	37°36′30″N 97°17′54″W
Odin	Barton	87	4.008	10.4	38°34′23″N 98°37′00″W
Ogallah	Trego	28	1.601	4.1	38°59′41″N 99°43′57″W
Opolis	Crawford	104	0.689	1.8	37°20′54″N 94°37′28″W
Peck	Sedgwick; Sumner	162	0.354	0.9	37°28′40″N 97°22′10″W
Piedmont	Greenwood	52	3.709	9.6	37°36′55″N 96°22′45″W
Pierceville	Finney	98	2.056	5.3	37°52′57″N 100°40′36″W
Pilsen	Marion	65	1.407	3.6	38°28′05″N 97°02′04″W
Piqua	Woodson	90	4.007	10.4	37°55′18″N 95°32′16″W
Radley	Crawford	105	0.758	2.0	37°29′06″N 94°45′43″W
Ringo	Crawford	111	1.537	4.0	37°30′23″N 94°46′12″W
Riverton	Cherokee	771	2.298	6.0	37°04′24″N 94°42′25″W
Rock	Cowley	94	0.4	1.0	37°26′30″N 97°00′25″W
Rosalia	Butler	149	1.271	3.3	37°48′57″N 96°37′30″W
Roxbury	McPherson	70	4.031	10.4	38°33′02″N 97°25′40″W
St. Benedict	Nemaha	50	1.441	3.7	39°53′34″N 96°06′11″W
St. Marks	Sedgwick	124	0.982	2.5	37°44′21″N 97°33′33″W
Shallow Water	Scott	89	0.495	1.3	38°22′26″N 100°54′38″W
Silverdale	Cowley	61	1.038	2.7	37°02′33″N 96°54′06″W
Somerset	Miami	90	0.45	1.2	38°36′17″N 94°46′46″W
South Mound	Neosho	27	1.007	2.6	37°26′10″N 95°13′11″W
Stuttgart	Phillips	44	0.661	1.7	39°47′58″N 99°27′17″W
Sycamore	Montgomery	70	1.947	5.0	37°19′07″N 95°42′56″W
Talmage	Dickinson	78	0.098	0.3	39°01′37″N 97°15′35″W
Tecumseh	Shawnee	696	3.591	9.3	39°02′06″N 95°34′47″W
Urbana	Neosho	30	1.705	4.4	37°33′29″N 95°23′59″W
Vassar	Osage	584	4.868	12.6	38°38′55″N 95°36′36″W
Wabaunsee	Wabaunsee	104	1.356	3.5	39°08′37″N 96°20′32″W
Wakarusa	Shawnee	242	4.999	12.9	38°53′38″N 95°42′18″W
Wayside	Montgomery	19	0.173	0.4	37°07′35″N 95°52′13″W
Welda	Anderson	149	0.934	2.4	38°10′20″N 95°17′30″W
Wells	Ottawa	45	1.396	3.6	39°08′21″N 97°33′04″W
Weskan	Wallace	158	2.64	6.8	38°51′55″N 101°58′05″W
Williamstown	Jefferson	96	0.117	0.3	39°03′51″N 95°19′56″W
Wilroads Gardens	Ford	639	2.253	5.8	37°42′55″N 99°55′37″W
Woodruff	Phillips	13	2.008	5.2	39°59′15″N 99°25′54″W
Wright	Ford	145	2.059	5.3	37°46′31″N 99°53′26″W
Yale	Crawford	81	1.019	2.6	37°29′22″N 94°38′50″W
Yoder	Reno	165	2.697	7.0	37°56′44″N 97°52′05″W
Zeandale	Riley	62	1.363	3.5	39°09′46″N 96°25′40″W

== See also ==
- List of counties in Kansas
- List of townships in Kansas
- List of cities in Kansas
- List of unincorporated communities in Kansas
- List of ghost towns in Kansas
- Lists of places in Kansas
- Kansas locations by per capita income
- Kansas census statistical areas
- Kansas license plate county codes
