= Morrill Township, Kansas =

Morrill Township
- Township
- Location in Brown County
- Coordinates: 39°56′55″N 095°43′01″W
- Country: United States
- State: Kansas
- County: Brown

Area
  - Total: 40.70 sq mi (105.41 km^{2})
  - Land: 40.60 sq mi (105.16 km^{2})
  - Water: 0.097 sq mi (0.25 km^{2}) 0.24%
- Elevation: 1,086 ft (331 m)

Population (2000)
  - Total: 503
  - Density: 12/sq mi (4.8/km^{2})
- GNIS feature ID: 0472752

Morrill Township is a township in Brown County, Kansas, United States. As of the 2000 census, its population was 503.

== Geography ==
Morrill Township covers an area of 40.7 square miles (105 km^{2}) and contains one incorporated settlement, Morrill. The airport and eastern fringes of the city of Sabetha are also in Morrill Township. According to the USGS, it contains one cemetery, Dunkard.

The stream of Pedee Creek runs through this township.
