= Sac and Fox Reservation =

Indian Reservation in Kansas and Nebraska, U.S.

Coordinates: 40°00′02″N 95°31′05″W

The Sac and Fox Reservation of Sauk (Sac) and Meskwaki (Fox) people is a 23.639 sq mi (61.226 km^{2}) tract located in southeastern Richardson County, Nebraska, and northeastern Brown County, Kansas. It is governed by the Sac and Fox Nation of Missouri in Kansas and Nebraska, and the headquarters for reservation is in Reserve, Kansas. The tribal jurisdiction area is west of White Cloud, Kansas and northeast of Hiawatha, Kansas. It was created as a consequence of the Platte Purchase of 1836.

Other reservations associated with the Sac and Fox Nation:

- Sac and Fox/Meskwaki Settlement -- located in central Iowa
- Sac and Fox Nation in Stroud, Oklahoma, which is the largest domestic dependent nation associated with the Sauk (Sac) and Meskwaki (Fox) peoples, and covers Lincoln, Payne, and Pottawatomie counties in Oklahoma.

== See also ==
- Native American tribes in Nebraska
