= Hiawatha Township =

Hiawatha Township may refer to the following townships in the United States:

- Hiawatha Township, Michigan
- Hiawatha Township, Brown County, Kansas
