= Irving Township =

Irving Township may refer to:

- Irving Township, Montgomery County, Illinois
- Irving Township, Brown County, Kansas
- Irving Township, Michigan
- Irving Township, Kandiyohi County, Minnesota
- Irving Township, Faulk County, South Dakota, in Faulk County, South Dakota
