= Horton High School =

Horton High School may refer to one of several places:

In Canada:

- Horton High School (Nova Scotia) — Greenwich, Nova Scotia

In the United States:

- Horton High School (Kansas) — Horton, Kansas
- Hanover-Horton High School — Horton, Michigan
- Ladue Horton Watkins High School — St. Louis, Missouri
- Horton High School, for Black children, is a former school in Pittsboro, North Carolina
