= Mission Township =

Mission Township may refer to:

- Mission Township, LaSalle County, Illinois
- Mission Township, Brown County, Kansas
- Mission Township, Neosho County, Kansas
- Mission Township, Shawnee County, Kansas, in Shawnee County, Kansas
- Mission Township, Crow Wing County, Minnesota
- Mission Township, Benson County, North Dakota
- Mission Township, Corson County, South Dakota, in Corson County, South Dakota
