= Hamlin Township, Kansas =

Hamlin Township
- Township
- Location in Brown County
- Coordinates: 39°57′10″N 095°35′56″W
- Country: United States
- State: Kansas
- County: Brown

Area
  - Total: 40.90 sq mi (105.93 km^{2})
  - Land: 40.83 sq mi (105.75 km^{2})
  - Water: 0.073 sq mi (0.19 km^{2}) 0.18%
- Elevation: 1,073 ft (327 m)

Population (2000)
  - Total: 344
  - Density: 8.5/sq mi (3.3/km^{2})
- GNIS feature ID: 0472776

Hamlin Township is a township in Brown County, Kansas, United States. As of the 2000 census, its population was 344.

== Geography ==
Hamlin Township covers an area of 40.9 square miles (106 km^{2}) and contains two incorporated settlements: Hamlin and Reserve.

The streams of Euchre Creek, Spring Branch, Terrapin Creek and Walnut Creek run through this township.
