= Washington Township, Brown County, Kansas =

Washington Township
- Township
- Location in Brown County
- Coordinates: 39°42′45″N 095°24′26″W
- Country: United States
- State: Kansas
- County: Brown

Area
  - Total: 44.99 sq mi (116.52 km^{2})
  - Land: 44.91 sq mi (116.32 km^{2})
  - Water: 0.077 sq mi (0.2 km^{2}) 0.17%
- Elevation: 1,070 ft (326 m)

Population (2000)
  - Total: 541
  - Density: 12/sq mi (4.7/km^{2})
- GNIS feature ID: 0472991

Washington Township is a township in Brown County, Kansas, United States. As of the 2000 census, its population was 541.

== Geography ==
Washington Township covers an area of 44.99 square miles (116.5 km^{2}) and contains one incorporated settlement, Everest. According to the USGS, it contains three cemeteries: All Saints, Kimberlin and Miller.
