= Robinson Township, Kansas =

Robinson Township
- Township
- Location in Brown County
- Coordinates: 39°49′16″N 095°24′31″W
- Country: United States
- State: Kansas
- County: Brown

Area
  - Total: 44.87 sq mi (116.22 km^{2})
  - Land: 44.76 sq mi (115.92 km^{2})
  - Water: 0.11 sq mi (0.29 km^{2}) 0.25%
- Elevation: 1,010 ft (308 m)

Population (2000)
  - Total: 452
  - Density: 10/sq mi (3.9/km^{2})
- GNIS feature ID: 0472990

Robinson Township is a township in Brown County, Kansas, United States. As of the 2000 census, its population was 452.

== Geography ==
Robinson Township covers an area of 44.87 square miles (116.2 km^{2}) and contains one incorporated settlement, Robinson. According to the USGS, it contains two cemeteries: Rose Hill and Ununda.

The streams of Buttermilk Creek, Middle Fork Wolf River and South Fork Wolf River run through this township.
