= National Register of Historic Places listings in Brown County, Kansas =

Location of Brown County in Kansas

This is a list of the National Register of Historic Places listings in Brown County, Kansas.

This is intended to be a complete list of the properties and districts on the National Register of Historic Places in Brown County, Kansas, United States. The locations of all nationally registered properties and districts of which the latitude and longitude coordinates are included below, may be seen in a map.

There are 17 properties and districts listed on the National Register in the county.

This National Park Service list is complete through NPS recent listings posted July 10, 2026.

== Current listings ==
	Name on the Register	Image	Date listed	Location	City or town	Description
1	Bank of Powhattan Building	Bank of Powhattan Building	June 3, 2025 (#100011913)	302 Main Street; 39°45′42″N 95°38′04″W	Powhattan	
2	Bethany Brethren Church	Bethany Brethren Church	October 9, 2012 (#12000843)	121 1st St. 39°54′55″N 95°37′49″W	Hamlin	No longer extant
3	Samuel Bierer House	Samuel Bierer House	July 8, 2010 (#10000450)	410 North 7th St. 39°51′22″N 95°32′15″W	Hiawatha	
4	Abraham Brien House	Abraham Brien House	August 21, 2024 (#100009178)	2058 330th St. 39°59′12″N 95°25′26″W	White Cloud vicinity	
5	Davis Memorial	Davis Memorial	August 29, 1977 (#77000571)	0.1 mile east of Hiawatha, Mt. Hope Cemetery; 39°50′57″N 95°30′58″W	Hiawatha	
6	Delaware River Warren Truss Bridge	Delaware River Warren Truss Bridge	June 9, 2004 (#04000580)	Coyote Rd., 190th St., 4.1 miles south and 0.5 miles east of Fairview; 39°46′59″N 95°42′51″W	Fairview	
7	A. J. Eicholtz House	A. J. Eicholtz House	January 28, 2004 (#03001493)	406 North 7th St. 39°51′22″N 95°32′15″W	Hiawatha	
8	Fete Apartments	Fete Apartments	July 12, 2019 (#100004202)	205 E. 7th St. 39°39′32″N 95°31′33″W	Horton	
9	Seward Graham House	Seward Graham House	December 11, 2008 (#08001172)	115 Miami St. 39°51′22″N 95°31′38″W	Hiawatha	
10	William and Augusta Guild House	William and Augusta Guild House	August 23, 2024 (#100010232)	610 Miami Street; 39°51′22″N 95°32′12″W	Hiawatha	
11	Hiawatha Courthouse Square Historic District	Hiawatha Courthouse Square Historic District	August 21, 2006 (#05001052)	520-819 Oregon, 101-123 S6, 108-124 S7, 601-613 Utah; 39°51′09″N 95°32′13″W	Hiawatha	
12	Hiawatha Memorial Auditorium	Hiawatha Memorial Auditorium	September 5, 1985 (#85001978)	611 Utah St. 39°51′09″N 95°32′10″W	Hiawatha	
13	Hiawatha National Guard Armory	Hiawatha National Guard Armory	July 7, 2004 (#04000667)	108 N. 1st. St. 39°51′13″N 95°31′39″W	Hiawatha	
14	Horton Civic Center	Horton Civic Center	March 26, 2020 (#100005121)	125 West 7th St. and 145 West 7th St. 39°39′32″N 95°31′45″W	Horton	
15	Iowa Tribe Community Building	Iowa Tribe Community Building	June 27, 2016 (#16000404)	330th Rd. 39°59′15″N 95°22′13″W	White Cloud	
16	Site No. RH00-062	Site No. RH00-062	June 19, 1987 (#87001001)	6½ miles southeast of Rulo, Nebraska and 200 feet west of the road between White Cloud, Kansas and Rulo; 40°00′00″N 95°19′55″W	Iowa Township	Extends into Doniphan County, Kansas and Richardson County, Nebraska
17	U.S. Post Office – Horton	U.S. Post Office – Horton	October 17, 1989 (#89001643)	825 1st Ave. E. 39°39′39″N 95°31′34″W	Horton	

== See also ==
- List of National Historic Landmarks in Kansas
- National Register of Historic Places listings in Kansas
