= Padonia, Kansas =

Unincorporated community in Brown County, Kansas

Coordinates: 39°55′24″N 95°33′46″W

Padonia is an unincorporated community in Padonia Township, Brown County, Kansas, United States.

== History ==
The first settlement at Padonia was made in 1854. The community was named for Jesse Padon, a pioneer settler. A post office was established in Padonia in 1857, and remained in operation until it was discontinued in 1933.
