= Baker, Kansas =

Unincorporated community in Brown County, Kansas

Coordinates: 39°45′15″N 95°33′47″W

Baker is an unincorporated community in Brown County, Kansas, United States. As of 2023, it is located in a rural area with two houses remaining at the original town site.

== History ==
Baker was laid out in 1882 by the Missouri Pacific Railroad; the town was named for the Baker family, the original owners of the town site. A post office was opened in Baker in 1882, and remained in operation until it was discontinued in 1933.
