= Mission Township, Brown County, Kansas =

Mission Township
- Township
- Location in Brown County
- Coordinates: 39°42′46″N 095°33′06″W
- Country: United States
- State: Kansas
- County: Brown

Area
  - Total: 85.08 sq mi (220.36 km^{2})
  - Land: 84.46 sq mi (218.75 km^{2})
  - Water: 0.62 sq mi (1.61 km^{2}) 0.73%
- Elevation: 1,120 ft (340 m)

Population (2000)
  - Total: 645
  - Density: 7.5/sq mi (2.9/km^{2})
- GNIS feature ID: 0472980

Mission Township is a township in Brown County, Kansas, United States. As of the 2000 census, its population was 645.

== History ==
Mission Township was formed in 1872.

== Geography ==
Mission Township covers an area of 85.08 square miles (220.4 km^{2}). It contains one incorporated settlement, Willis, and surrounds another, the governmentally independent city of Horton. According to the USGS, it contains four cemeteries: Carr, Claytonville, Kennekuk and Saint Peters.

The stream of Hazel Creek runs through this township.

== Transportation ==
Mission Township contains one airport or landing strip, Horton Municipal Airport.
