= Mercier, Kansas =

Unincorporated community in Brown County, Kansas

Coordinates: 39°42′30″N 95°36′06″W

Mercier is an unincorporated community in Mission Township, Brown County, Kansas, United States.

== History ==
A post office operated in Mercier from 1897 until 1972, but it was called Germantown until 1918.
