= Brown State Fishing Lake =

Protected area in Brown County, Kansas

Coordinates: 39°50′54″N 95°22′30″W

Brown State Fishing Lake (sometimes also known as Brown State Fishing Lake And Wildlife Area) is a protected area in Brown County, Kansas in the United States. The lake is 62 acres (0.25 km^{2}) in area and up to 13 feet (4 m) deep. The area was formerly known as Brown County State Park, and is 8 miles (13 km) east of Hiawatha, Kansas.
