= Horton High School (Kansas) =

Location
- 1120 First Avenue East; Horton, Kansas 66439; United States; 39°39′49″N 95°31′31″W

Information
- School type: Public, High School
- School board: Board Website
- School district: South Brown County USD 430
- CEEB code: 171385
- Principal: Larry Mills
- Teaching staff: 13.60 (FTE)
- Grades: 9 to 12
- Gender: coed
- Enrollment: 160 (2023–2024)
- Student to teacher ratio: 11.76
- Campus type: Rural
- Colors: Royal Blue; White
- Athletics: Class 1A; District 2
- Athletics conference: Northeast Kansas League
- Sports: Football, Basketball, Golf, Volleyball, Wrestling, Track
- Mascot: Charger
- Team name: Chargers
- Rival: Atchison County Community High School
- Communities served: Horton, Everest, Willis, Powhattan
- Website: School Website

Horton High School is a public secondary school in Horton, Kansas, United States. It is operated by South Brown County USD 430, and has approximately 150 students enrolled (2019-2020).

== School layout ==
Horton High School consists of two buildings. The commons, and the main school building. The main school building has four stories in which only three are taught in. The commons area is the gym, lunch room, shop, music, and auditorium building.

== Athletics ==
Horton High had its most successful year in athletics in the 2007–2008 school year. During this year, the football, the football team was named the Delaware Valley League (DVL) Champions. This feat had not been accomplished for many years. In addition to a successful season in football, the basketball team also experienced much success by competing in the Class 3A State Tournament, something they haven't done since the Lady Chargers in 2004.

== Theatre ==
The theatre department at HHS is considered a successful department. The students put on one musical and two plays each year. The winter play was traditionally a comedy and the spring play was traditionally a drama, with few exceptions.

== Career and technology ==
The school has 4 CTE programs: Agriculture, Business, Home Economics, Trade/Industry. The student organizations from these programs include FFA, FBLA, FCCLA and Skills. All of these student organizations are very active and successful in their competitions. These programs are the backbone of activities related to Career Exploration and success. Many of these students compete in State and National contests. Many scholarships are awarded to these students each year.

== See also ==
- List of high schools in Kansas
- List of unified school districts in Kansas
