= Morrill, Kansas =

City in Brown County, Kansas

- City
- Location within Brown County and Kansas

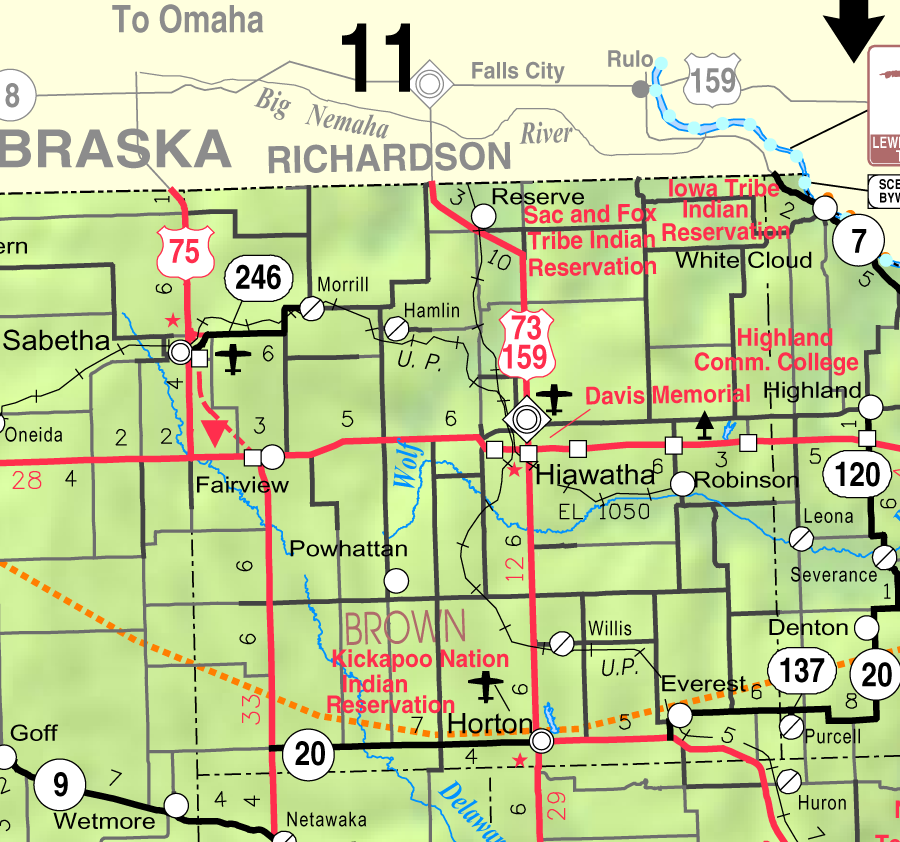
- KDOT map of Brown County (legend)
- Coordinates: 39°55′45″N 95°41′40″W
- Country: United States
- State: Kansas
- County: Brown
- Founded: 1878
- Platted: 1878
- Incorporated: 1886
- Named for: Edmund Morrill

Area
  - Total: 0.20 sq mi (0.51 km^{2})
  - Land: 0.20 sq mi (0.51 km^{2})
  - Water: 0 sq mi (0.00 km^{2})
- Elevation: 1,112 ft (339 m)

Population (2020)
  - Total: 218
  - Density: 1,100/sq mi (430/km^{2})
- Time zone: UTC-6 (CST)
  - Summer (DST): UTC-5 (CDT)
- ZIP Code: 66515
- Area code: 785
- FIPS code: 20-48300
- GNIS ID: 2395406

Morrill is a city in Brown County, Kansas, United States. As of the 2020 census, the population of the city was 218.

== History ==
Morrill was laid out in 1878 when the St. Joseph and Western Railroad was extended to that point. It was named for Kansas governor Edmund Needham Morrill.

== Geography ==
According to the United States Census Bureau, the city has a total area of 0.19 square miles (0.49 km^{2}), all land.

== Demographics ==
Historical population
Census	Pop.	Note	%±
1890	308		—
1900	400		29.9%
1910	398		−0.5%
1920	552		38.7%
1930	519		−6.0%
1940	387		−25.4%
1950	362		−6.5%
1960	299		−17.4%
1970	308		3.0%
1980	336		9.1%
1990	299		−11.0%
2000	277		−7.4%
2010	230		−17.0%
2020	218		−5.2%
U.S. Decennial Census

=== 2020 census ===
The 2020 United States census counted 218 people, 78 households, and 51 families in Morrill. The population density was 1,095.5 per square mile (423.0/km^{2}). There were 98 housing units at an average density of 492.5 per square mile (190.1/km^{2}). The racial makeup was 89.91% (196) white or European American (88.53% non-Hispanic white), 0.0% (0) black or African-American, 5.5% (12) Native American or Alaska Native, 0.0% (0) Asian, 0.0% (0) Pacific Islander or Native Hawaiian, 0.0% (0) from other races, and 4.59% (10) from two or more races. Hispanic or Latino of any race was 1.83% (4) of the population.

Of the 78 households, 30.8% had children under the age of 18; 51.3% were married couples living together; 15.4% had a female householder with no spouse or partner present. 26.9% of households consisted of individuals and 10.3% had someone living alone who was 65 years of age or older. The average household size was 3.1 and the average family size was 3.5. The percent of those with a bachelor's degree or higher was estimated to be 6.0% of the population.

25.2% of the population was under the age of 18, 9.2% from 18 to 24, 18.3% from 25 to 44, 31.7% from 45 to 64, and 15.6% who were 65 years of age or older. The median age was 40.5 years. For every 100 females, there were 113.7 males. For every 100 females ages 18 and older, there were 114.5 males.

The 2016–2020 5-year American Community Survey estimates show that the median household income was $57,500 (with a margin of error of +/- $29,763) and the median family income was $73,125 (+/- $41,547). Males had a median income of $39,750 (+/- $34,089) versus $22,188 (+/- $15,492) for females. The median income for those above 16 years old was $35,469 (+/- $18,962). Approximately, 0.0% of families and 5.4% of the population were below the poverty line, including 7.5% of those under the age of 18 and 0.0% of those ages 65 or over.

=== 2010 census ===
As of the census of 2010, there were 230 people, 88 households, and 66 families residing in the city. The population density was 1,210.5 inhabitants per square mile (467.4/km^{2}). There were 105 housing units at an average density of 552.6 per square mile (213.4/km^{2}). The racial makeup of the city was 96.5% White, 1.3% Native American, and 2.2% from two or more races. Hispanic or Latino of any race were 2.2% of the population.

There were 88 households, of which 36.4% had children under the age of 18 living with them, 62.5% were married couples living together, 6.8% had a female householder with no husband present, 5.7% had a male householder with no wife present, and 25.0% were non-families. 20.5% of all households were made up of individuals, and 8% had someone living alone who was 65 years of age or older. The average household size was 2.61 and the average family size was 2.91.

The median age in the city was 38 years. 27% of residents were under the age of 18; 5.7% were between the ages of 18 and 24; 24.4% were from 25 to 44; 32.6% were from 45 to 64; and 10.4% were 65 years of age or older. The gender makeup of the city was 49.6% male and 50.4% female.

=== 2000 census ===
As of the census of 2000, there were 277 people, 101 households, and 75 families residing in the city. The population density was 1,340.2 inhabitants per square mile (517.5/km^{2}). There were 113 housing units at an average density of 546.7 per square mile (211.1/km^{2}). The racial makeup of the city was 96.03% White, 1.44% African American, 0.36% Pacific Islander, and 2.17% from two or more races. Hispanic or Latino of any race were 0.36% of the population.

There were 101 households, out of which 35.6% had children under the age of 18 living with them, 64.4% were married couples living together, 6.9% had a female householder with no husband present, and 24.8% were non-families. 22.8% of all households were made up of individuals, and 6.9% had someone living alone who was 65 years of age or older. The average household size was 2.74 and the average family size was 3.24.

In the city, the population was spread out, with 30.3% under the age of 18, 7.6% from 18 to 24, 28.9% from 25 to 44, 22.7% from 45 to 64, and 10.5% who were 65 years of age or older. The median age was 36 years. For every 100 females, there were 95.1 males. For every 100 females age 18 and over, there were 107.5 males.

The median income for a household in the city was $30,357, and the median income for a family was $32,813. Males had a median income of $30,250 versus $17,500 for females. The per capita income for the city was $11,924. About 24.7% of families and 34.0% of the population were below the poverty line, including 56.8% of those under the age of eighteen and none of those 65 or over.

== Education ==
The community is served by Prairie Hills USD 113 public school district, formed in 2010 by the merger of Sabetha USD 441 and Axtel USD 488.

Morrill High School was closed through school unification. The Morrill High School mascot was Tigers.

== Notable people ==
- Howard Shultz Miller, former U.S. Representative from Kansas.
