= Everest, Kansas =

City in Brown County, Kansas

- City
- Location within Brown County and Kansas

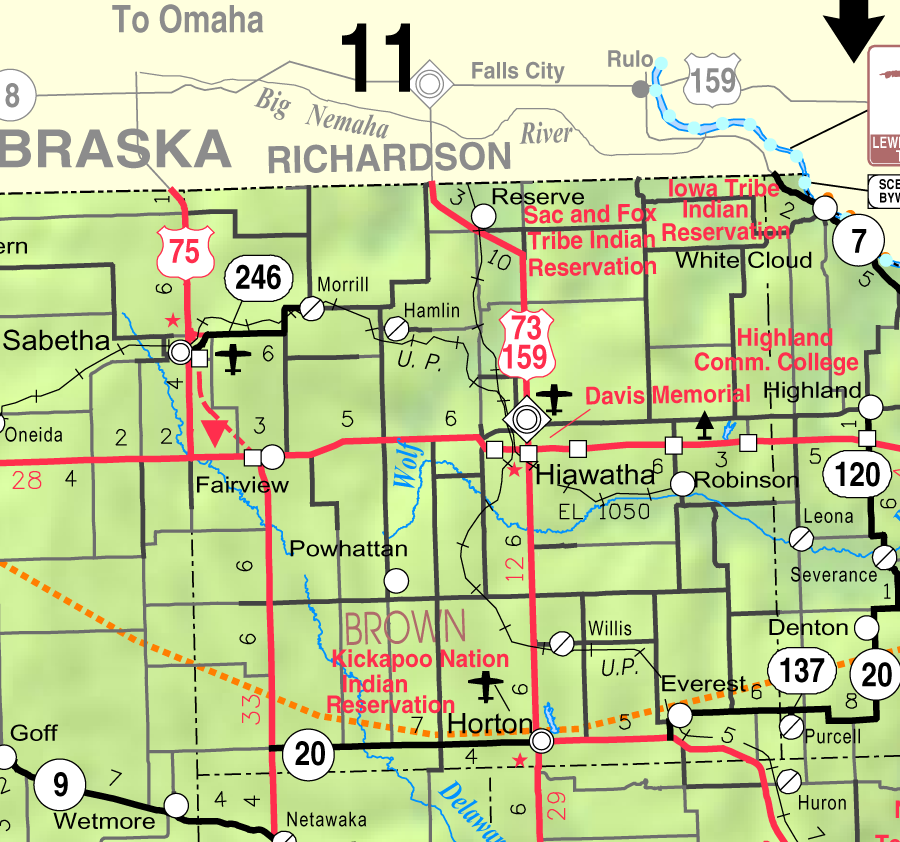
- KDOT map of Brown County (legend)
- Coordinates: 39°40′37″N 95°25′29″W
- Country: United States
- State: Kansas
- County: Brown
- Founded: 1882
- Incorporated: 1882
- Named for: Aaron Everest

Area
  - Total: 0.25 sq mi (0.64 km^{2})
  - Land: 0.25 sq mi (0.64 km^{2})
  - Water: 0 sq mi (0.00 km^{2})
- Elevation: 1,148 ft (350 m)

Population (2020)
  - Total: 265
  - Density: 1,100/sq mi (410/km^{2})
- Time zone: UTC-6 (CST)
  - Summer (DST): UTC-5 (CDT)
- ZIP Code: 66424
- Area code: 785
- FIPS code: 20-22025
- GNIS ID: 2394713
- Website: www.cityofeverestks.gov

Everest is a city in Brown County, Kansas, United States. As of the 2020 census, the population of the city was 265.

== History ==
Everest got its start circa 1882 following construction of the railroad through that territory. It was named in honor of Colonel Aaron S. Everest, an attorney for the Central Branch Union Pacific Railroad who represented Atchison County in the Kansas Senate.

== Geography ==
According to the United States Census Bureau, the city has a total area of 0.26 square miles (0.67 km^{2}), all land.

== Demographics ==
Historical population
Census	Pop.	Note	%±
1890	478		—
1900	502		5.0%
1910	436		−13.1%
1920	403		−7.6%
1930	386		−4.2%
1940	375		−2.8%
1950	363		−3.2%
1960	348		−4.1%
1970	304		−12.6%
1980	331		8.9%
1990	310		−6.3%
2000	314		1.3%
2010	284		−9.6%
2020	265		−6.7%
U.S. Decennial Census

=== 2020 census ===
The 2020 United States census counted 265 people, 113 households, and 64 families in Everest. The population density was 1,142.2 per square mile (441.0/km^{2}). There were 139 housing units at an average density of 599.1 per square mile (231.3/km^{2}). The racial makeup was 90.94% (241) white or European American (90.94% non-Hispanic white), 2.64% (7) black or African-American, 1.13% (3) Native American or Alaska Native, 0.0% (0) Asian, 0.75% (2) Pacific Islander or Native Hawaiian, 0.0% (0) from other races, and 4.53% (12) from two or more races. Hispanic or Latino of any race was 0.0% (0) of the population.

Of the 113 households, 23.9% had children under the age of 18; 41.6% were married couples living together; 28.3% had a female householder with no spouse or partner present. 31.9% of households consisted of individuals and 15.9% had someone living alone who was 65 years of age or older. The average household size was 2.8 and the average family size was 3.9. The percent of those with a bachelor's degree or higher was estimated to be 38.1% of the population.

20.0% of the population was under the age of 18, 12.1% from 18 to 24, 21.1% from 25 to 44, 23.4% from 45 to 64, and 23.4% who were 65 years of age or older. The median age was 43.8 years. For every 100 females, there were 112.0 males. For every 100 females ages 18 and older, there were 116.3 males.

The 2016–2020 5-year American Community Survey estimates show that the median household income was $41,250 (with a margin of error of +/- $14,263) and the median family income was $56,786 (+/- $6,645). Males had a median income of $25,781 (+/- $15,531) versus $35,089 (+/- $12,879) for females. The median income for those above 16 years old was $30,417 (+/- $8,407). Approximately, 15.8% of families and 35.9% of the population were below the poverty line, including 12.0% of those under the age of 18 and 4.6% of those ages 65 or over.

=== 2010 census ===
As of the census of 2010, there were 284 people, 126 households, and 79 families residing in the city. The population density was 1,092.3 inhabitants per square mile (421.7/km^{2}). There were 155 housing units at an average density of 596.2 per square mile (230.2/km^{2}). The racial makeup of the city was 91.5% White, 1.1% African American, 2.1% Native American, 4.2% from other races, and 1.1% from two or more races. Hispanic or Latino of any race were 4.9% of the population.

There were 126 households, of which 29.4% had children under the age of 18 living with them, 48.4% were married couples living together, 10.3% had a female householder with no husband present, 4.0% had a male householder with no wife present, and 37.3% were non-families. 32.5% of all households were made up of individuals, and 15.1% had someone living alone who was 65 years of age or older. The average household size was 2.25 and the average family size was 2.84.

The median age in the city was 40.2 years. 25.7% of residents were under the age of 18; 4.6% were between the ages of 18 and 24; 24.6% were from 25 to 44; 30.7% were from 45 to 64; and 14.4% were 65 years of age or older. The gender makeup of the city was 49.3% male and 50.7% female.

=== 2000 census ===
As of the census of 2000, there were 314 people, 135 households, and 90 families residing in the city. The population density was 1,226.4 inhabitants per square mile (473.5/km^{2}). There were 156 housing units at an average density of 609.3 per square mile (235.3/km^{2}). The racial makeup of the city was 90.76% White, 2.87% African American, 4.78% Native American, 0.32% from other races, and 1.27% from two or more races. Hispanic or Latino of any race were 2.23% of the population.

There were 135 households, out of which 31.1% had children under the age of 18 living with them, 57.0% were married couples living together, 6.7% had a female householder with no husband present, and 33.3% were non-families. 28.9% of all households were made up of individuals, and 20.7% had someone living alone who was 65 years of age or older. The average household size was 2.33 and the average family size was 2.89.

In the city, the population was spread out, with 25.2% under the age of 18, 9.9% from 18 to 24, 25.8% from 25 to 44, 20.7% from 45 to 64, and 18.5% who were 65 years of age or older. The median age was 38 years. For every 100 females, there were 93.8 males. For every 100 females age 18 and over, there were 89.5 males.

The median income for a household in the city was $27,500, and the median income for a family was $40,000. Males had a median income of $24,500 versus $23,438 for females. The per capita income for the city was $14,056. About 8.3% of families and 12.3% of the population were below the poverty line, including 12.8% of those under age 18 and 16.7% of those age 65 or over.

== Education ==
Everest is a part of USD 430 South Brown County. The district high school is Horton High School. The Horton High School mascot is Horton Chargers.

Everest High School was closed through school unification. The Everest High School mascot was Everest Vikings.
