= Brown County, Kansas =

County in Kansas, United States

- County
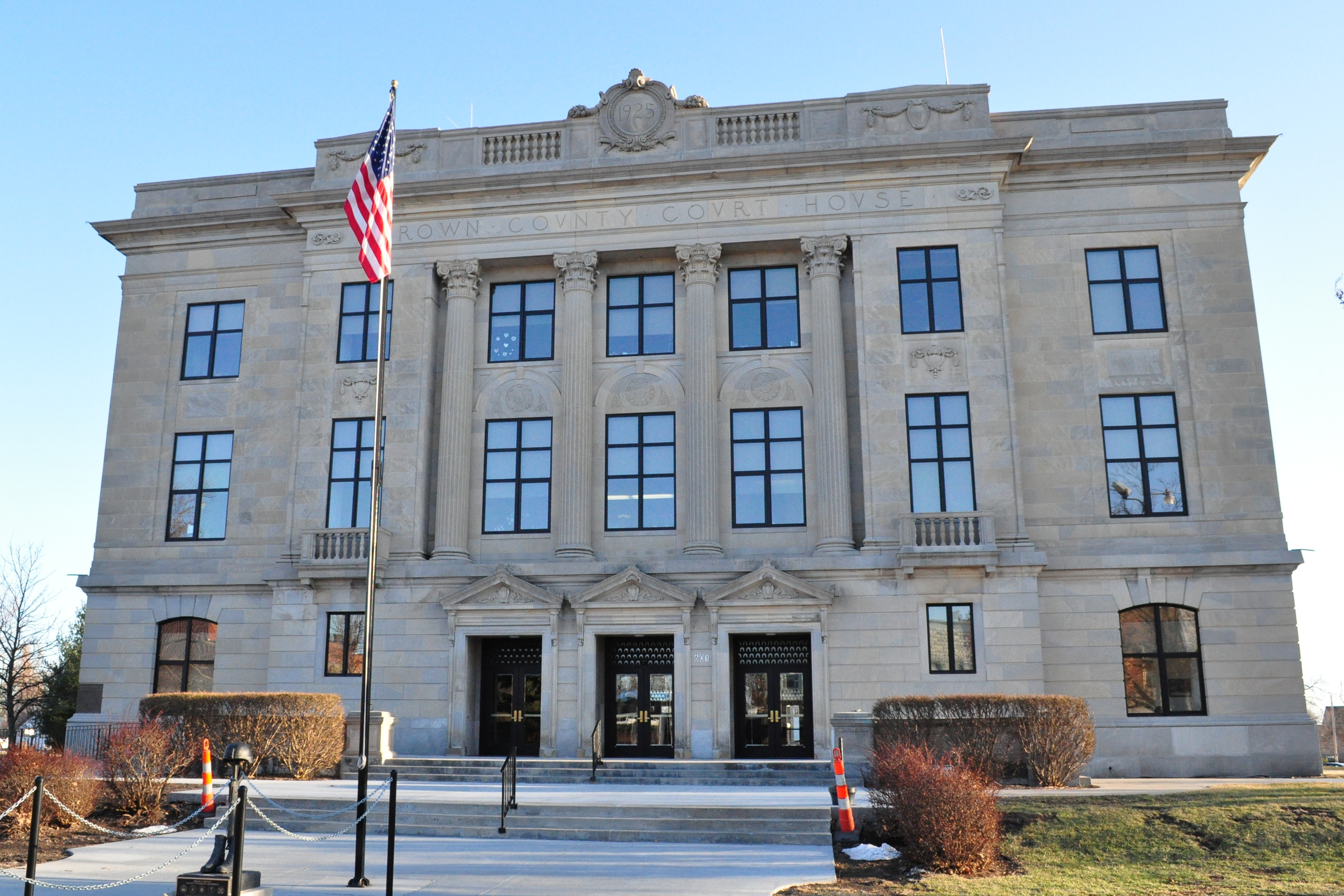
- Brown County Courthouse in Hiawatha (2011)

- Location within the U.S. state of Kansas
- Coordinates: 39°48′N 95°35′W
- Country: United States
- State: Kansas
- Founded: August 25, 1855
- Named for: Albert Gallatin Brown
- Seat: Hiawatha
- Largest city: Hiawatha

Area
  - Total: 572 sq mi (1,480 km^{2})
  - Land: 571 sq mi (1,480 km^{2})
  - Water: 1.2 sq mi (3.1 km^{2}) 0.2%

Population (2020)
  - Total: 9,508
  - Estimate (2025): 9,104 ▼
  - Density: 16.7/sq mi (6.4/km^{2})
- Time zone: UTC−6 (Central)
  - Summer (DST): UTC−5 (CDT)
- Area code: 785
- Congressional district: 2nd
- Website: brcoks.org

Brown County is a county located in the northeastern portion of the U.S. state of Kansas. Its county seat and most populous city is Hiawatha. As of the 2020 census, the county population was 9,508. The county was named after Albert G. Brown, a U.S. Senator from Mississippi and Kansas statehood advocate. The Kickapoo Indian Reservation of Kansas, the majority of the Sac and Fox Reservation, and the majority of the Iowa Reservation of Kansas and Nebraska are located within the county.

== History ==
=== Early history ===
For many millennia, the Great Plains of North America was inhabited by nomadic Native Americans. From the 16th century to 18th century, the Kingdom of France claimed ownership of large parts of North America. In 1762, after the French and Indian War, France secretly ceded New France to Spain, per the Treaty of Fontainebleau.

=== 19th century ===
In 1802, Spain returned most of the land to France, but keeping title to about 7,500 square miles. In 1803, most of the land for modern day Kansas was acquired by the United States from France as part of the 828,000 square mile Louisiana Purchase for 2.83 cents per acre.

In 1854, the Kansas Territory was organized, then in 1861 Kansas became the 34th U.S. state. Brown County was founded in 1855, was named for Albert G. Brown.

== Geography ==
According to the U.S. Census Bureau, the county has a total area of 572 square miles (1,480 km^{2}), of which 571 square miles (1,480 km^{2}) is land and 1.2 square miles (3.1 km^{2}) (0.2%) is water. The Wolf River has its source in the county. Brown State Fishing Lake, formerly known as "Brown County State Park" is in the county, 8 miles (13 km) east of Hiawatha.

=== Adjacent counties ===
- Richardson County, Nebraska (north)
- Doniphan County (east)
- Atchison County (southeast)
- Jackson County (southwest)
- Nemaha County (west)

=== Major highways ===
Sources: National Atlas, U.S. Census Bureau

- US-36
- US-73 / Lewis and Clark Trail
- US-75
- US-159
- K-20
- K-246

== Demographics ==
Historical population
Census	Pop.	Note	%±
1860	2,607		—
1870	6,823		161.7%
1880	12,817		87.8%
1890	20,319		58.5%
1900	22,369		10.1%
1910	21,314		−4.7%
1920	20,949		−1.7%
1930	20,553		−1.9%
1940	17,395		−15.4%
1950	14,651		−15.8%
1960	13,229		−9.7%
1970	11,685		−11.7%
1980	11,955		2.3%
1990	11,128		−6.9%
2000	10,724		−3.6%
2010	9,984		−6.9%
2020	9,508		−4.8%
2025 (est.)	9,104	▼	−4.2%
U.S. Decennial Census; 1790-1960 1900-1990; 1990-2000 2010-2020

=== Racial and ethnic composition ===
Brown County, Kansas – Racial and ethnic composition Note: the US Census treats Hispanic/Latino as an ethnic category. This table excludes Latinos from the racial categories and assigns them to a separate category. Hispanics/Latinos may be of any race.
Race / Ethnicity (NH = Non-Hispanic)	Pop 1980	Pop 1990	Pop 2000	Pop 2010	Pop 2020	% 1980	% 1990	% 2000	% 2010	% 2020
White alone (NH)	11,032	10,108	9,230	8,391	7,683	92.28%	90.83%	86.07%	84.04%	80.81%
Black or African American alone (NH)	126	131	161	116	97	1.05%	1.18%	1.50%	1.16%	1.02%
Native American or Alaska Native alone (NH)	594	668	890	869	795	4.97%	6.00%	8.30%	8.70%	8.36%
Asian alone (NH)	13	15	22	31	42	0.11%	0.13%	0.21%	0.31%	0.44%
Native Hawaiian or Pacific Islander alone (NH)	x	x	1	1	6	x	x	0.01%	0.01%	0.06%
Other race alone (NH)	0	14	12	5	25	0.00%	0.13%	0.11%	0.05%	0.26%
Mixed race or Multiracial (NH)	x	x	159	265	508	x	x	1.48%	2.65%	5.34%
Hispanic or Latino (any race)	190	192	249	306	352	1.59%	1.73%	2.32%	3.06%	3.70%
Total	11,955	11,128	10,724	9,984	9,508	100.00%	100.00%	100.00%	100.00%	100.00%

=== 2020 census ===
As of the 2020 census, the county had a population of 9,508. The median age was 42.6 years, 24.7% of residents were under the age of 18, and 21.2% of residents were 65 years of age or older. For every 100 females there were 96.9 males, and for every 100 females age 18 and over there were 95.4 males age 18 and over. 0.0% of residents lived in urban areas, while 100.0% lived in rural areas.

The racial makeup of the county was 81.7% White, 1.1% Black or African American, 9.2% American Indian and Alaska Native, 0.5% Asian, 0.1% Native Hawaiian and Pacific Islander, 1.1% from some other race, and 6.4% from two or more races. Hispanic or Latino residents of any race comprised 3.7% of the population.

There were 3,841 households in the county, of which 29.0% had children under the age of 18 living with them and 25.1% had a female householder with no spouse or partner present. About 30.3% of all households were made up of individuals and 14.4% had someone living alone who was 65 years of age or older.

There were 4,482 housing units, of which 14.3% were vacant. Among occupied housing units, 70.7% were owner-occupied and 29.3% were renter-occupied. The homeowner vacancy rate was 2.9% and the rental vacancy rate was 10.3%.

=== 2000 census ===
As of the 2000 census, there were 10,724 people, 4,318 households, and 2,949 families residing in the county. The population density was 19 people per square mile (7.3 people/km^{2}). There were 4,815 housing units at an average density of 8 per square mile (3.1/km^{2}). The racial makeup of the county was 86.87% White, 1.56% Black or African American, 8.82% Native American, 0.21% Asian, 0.01% Pacific Islander, 0.73% from other races, and 1.81% from two or more races. Hispanic or Latino of any race were 2.32% of the population.

There were 4,318 households, out of which 31.40% had children under the age of 18 living with them, 55.80% were married couples living together, 9.20% had a female householder with no husband present, and 31.70% were non-families. 28.80% of all households were made up of individuals, and 15.70% had someone living alone who was 65 years of age or older. The average household size was 2.44 and the average family size was 2.99.

In the county, the population was spread out, with 26.40% under the age of 18, 7.40% from 18 to 24, 24.00% from 25 to 44, 22.70% from 45 to 64, and 19.50% who were 65 years of age or older. The median age was 40 years. For every 100 females there were 93.50 males. For every 100 females age 18 and over, there were 89.80 males.

The median income for a household in the county was $31,971, and the median income for a family was $39,525. Males had a median income of $29,163 versus $19,829 for females. The per capita income for the county was $15,163. About 10.60% of families and 12.90% of the population were below the poverty line, including 16.40% of those under age 18 and 11.80% of those age 65 or over.

== Government ==
=== Presidential elections ===
Presidential election results

United States presidential election results for Brown County, Kansas
Year	Republican		Democratic		Third party(ies)	
Year	No.	%	No.	%	No.	%
1888	2,696	55.58%	1,803	37.17%	352	7.26%
1892	2,562	52.03%	0	0.00%	2,362	47.97%
1896	2,879	51.65%	2,618	46.97%	77	1.38%
1900	3,137	57.10%	2,298	41.83%	59	1.07%
1904	3,158	68.62%	1,244	27.03%	200	4.35%
1908	2,778	56.31%	2,044	41.44%	111	2.25%
1912	1,512	31.24%	1,774	36.65%	1,554	32.11%
1916	4,282	52.86%	3,503	43.25%	315	3.89%
1920	5,249	72.28%	1,937	26.67%	76	1.05%
1924	5,647	68.94%	1,866	22.78%	678	8.28%
1928	6,692	76.77%	2,005	23.00%	20	0.23%
1932	5,005	57.73%	3,604	41.57%	60	0.69%
1936	5,814	62.38%	3,495	37.50%	11	0.12%
1940	6,008	69.18%	2,633	30.32%	43	0.50%
1944	4,947	72.98%	1,817	26.80%	15	0.22%
1948	4,518	67.98%	2,060	31.00%	68	1.02%
1952	6,031	80.51%	1,440	19.22%	20	0.27%
1956	5,138	76.95%	1,519	22.75%	20	0.30%
1960	4,707	72.25%	1,773	27.21%	35	0.54%
1964	3,213	57.01%	2,386	42.33%	37	0.66%
1968	3,748	69.15%	1,199	22.12%	473	8.73%
1972	4,314	78.92%	1,038	18.99%	114	2.09%
1976	3,407	64.96%	1,745	33.27%	93	1.77%
1980	3,598	67.61%	1,370	25.74%	354	6.65%
1984	3,894	73.97%	1,303	24.75%	67	1.27%
1988	3,059	63.57%	1,719	35.72%	34	0.71%
1992	2,203	41.61%	1,476	27.88%	1,615	30.51%
1996	2,688	56.58%	1,529	32.18%	534	11.24%
2000	2,985	63.63%	1,512	32.23%	194	4.14%
2004	3,092	69.99%	1,268	28.70%	58	1.31%
2008	2,985	68.21%	1,317	30.10%	74	1.69%
2012	2,829	70.85%	1,076	26.95%	88	2.20%
2016	2,906	72.00%	863	21.38%	267	6.62%
2020	3,262	72.96%	1,104	24.69%	105	2.35%
2024	3,106	72.95%	1,065	25.01%	87	2.04%

Like all of Kansas outside the eastern cities, Brown County is overwhelmingly Republican, although its history of Yankee settlement means it has been thus for longer than certain other parts of the state. Brown was Alf Landon’s strongest county in his home state during his disastrous 1936 presidential campaign. FDR was never to win so much as 42 percent of the vote in any of his four Presidential elections; indeed no Democratic presidential nominee has ever won a majority in Brown County, with the highest percentage being 47 percent by William Jennings Bryan in 1896. A mortally divided Republican Party allowed Woodrow Wilson to win a plurality in 1912 with under 37 percent of the county's vote – nonetheless since 1968 no Democrat has reached even that percentage.

=== Laws ===
Following amendment to the Kansas Constitution in 1986, the county remained a prohibition, or "dry", county until 2000, when voters approved the sale of alcoholic liquor by the individual drink without a food sales requirement.

== Education ==
Unified school districts

- Hiawatha USD 415
- South Brown County USD 430

School district office in neighboring county

- Doniphan West USD 111
- Prairie Hills USD 113
- Jackson Heights USD 335

Bureau of Indian Education-affiliated tribal schools

- Kickapoo Nation School

== Communities ==
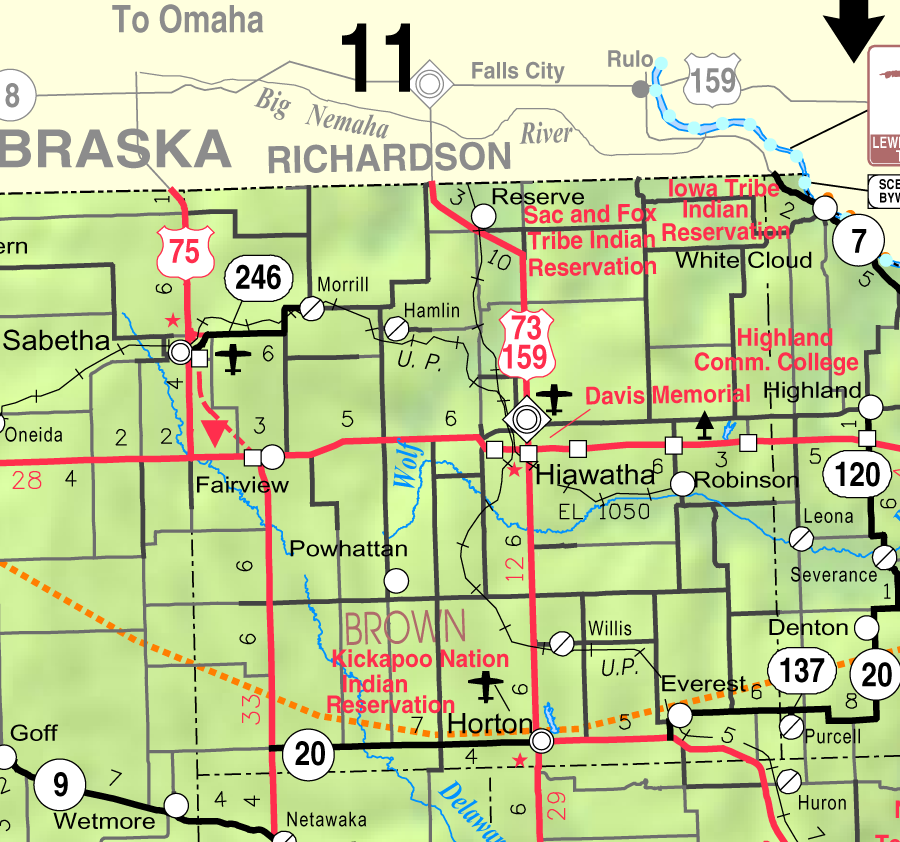
2005 map of Brown County (map legend)

List of townships / incorporated cities / unincorporated communities / extinct former communities within Brown County.

=== Cities ===
‡ means a community has portions in an adjacent county.

- Everest
- Fairview
- Hamlin
- Hiawatha (county seat)
- Horton
- Morrill
- Powhattan
- Reserve
- Robinson
- Sabetha‡
- Willis

=== Unincorporated communities ===
† means a community is designated a Census-Designated Place (CDP) by the United States Census Bureau.

- Baker
- Mercier
- Padonia
- Kickapoo Tribal Center†
- Kickapoo Site 1†
- Kickapoo Site 2†
- Kickapoo Site 5†
- Kickapoo Site 6†
- Kickapoo Site 7†

=== Indian reservations ===
- Ioway Reservation‡
- Kickapoo Indian Reservation of Kansas‡
- Sac and Fox Reservation‡

=== Townships ===
Brown County is divided into ten townships. The cities of Hiawatha, Horton, and Sabetha are considered governmentally independent and are excluded from the census figures for the townships. In the following table, the population center is the largest city (or cities) included in that township's population total, if it is of a significant size.

Township	FIPS	Population center	Population	Population density /km^{2} (/sq mi)	Land area km^{2} (sq mi)	Water area km^{2} (sq mi)	Water %	Geographic coordinates
Hamlin	29725		344	3 (8)	106 (41)	0 (0)	0.18%	39°57′1″N 95°36′40″W
Hiawatha	31700		739	4 (12)	164 (63)	0 (0)	0.18%	39°50′25″N 95°31′59″W
Irving	34500		311	2 (6)	137 (53)	0 (0)	0.04%	39°57′24″N 95°23′36″W
Mission	47200		645	3 (8)	219 (84)	2 (1)	0.73%	39°43′14″N 95°32′12″W
Morrill	48325	Morrill	503	5 (12)	105 (41)	0 (0)	0.24%	39°56′23″N 95°43′20″W
Padonia	54025		259	2 (6)	107 (41)	0 (0)	0.14%	39°57′2″N 95°31′4″W
Powhattan	57375		874	4 (10)	232 (90)	0 (0)	0.06%	39°43′49″N 95°41′59″W
Robinson	60350	Robinson	452	4 (10)	116 (45)	0 (0)	0.25%	39°48′29″N 95°23′49″W
Walnut	74875	Fairview	665	4 (11)	161 (62)	1 (0)	0.46%	39°50′53″N 95°42′27″W
Washington	75525	Everest	541	5 (12)	116 (45)	0 (0)	0.17%	39°41′43″N 95°24′41″W
Sources: "Census 2000 U.S. Gazetteer Files". U.S. Census Bureau, Geography Division. Archived from the original on August 2, 2002.

== See also ==
- National Register of Historic Places listings in Brown County, Kansas

Community information for Kansas

- Kansas locations by per capita income
- List of counties in Kansas
- List of townships in Kansas
- List of cities in Kansas
- List of unincorporated communities in Kansas
- List of ghost towns in Kansas
