= Robinson, Kansas =

City in Brown County, Kansas

- City
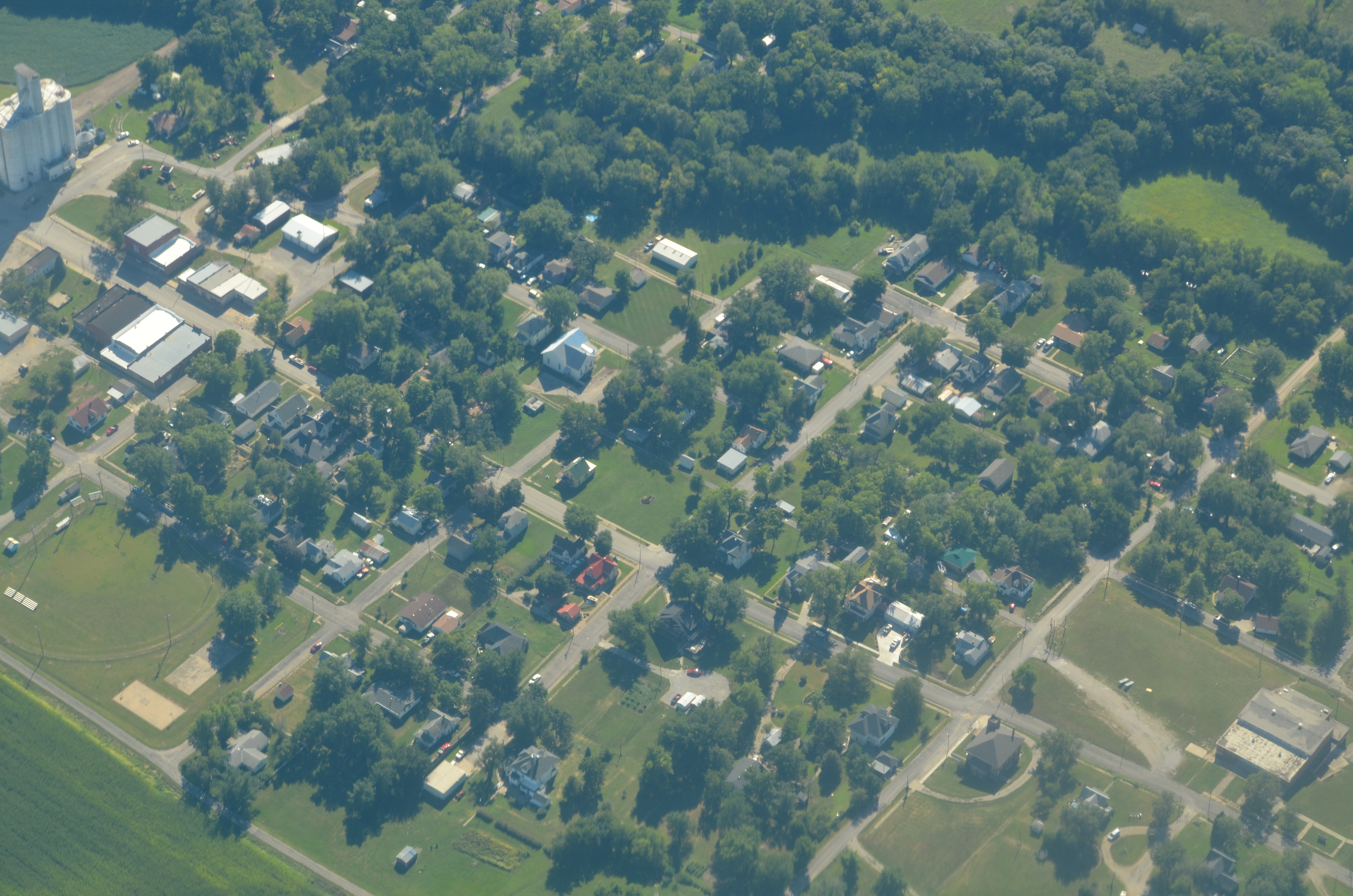
- Aerial view of Robinson (2013)

- Location within Brown County and Kansas

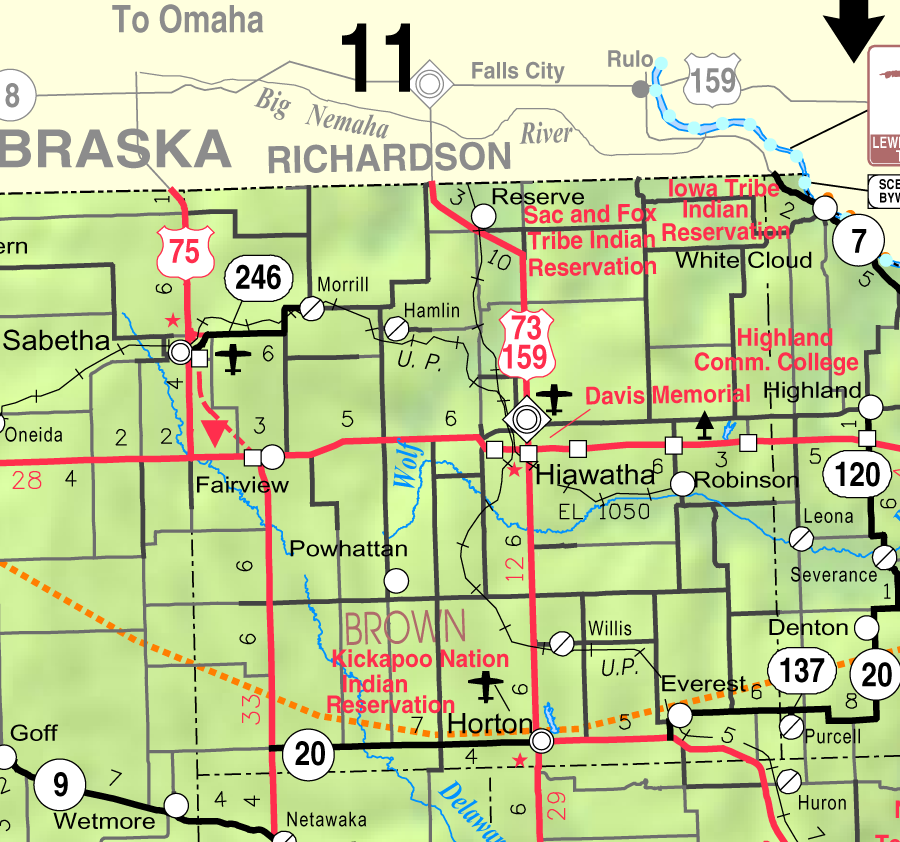
- KDOT map of Brown County (legend)
- Coordinates: 39°48′56″N 95°24′42″W
- Country: United States
- State: Kansas
- County: Brown
- Founded: 1871
- Incorporated: 1879
- Named for: Charles Robinson

Area
  - Total: 0.24 sq mi (0.62 km^{2})
  - Land: 0.24 sq mi (0.62 km^{2})
  - Water: 0 sq mi (0.00 km^{2})
- Elevation: 951 ft (290 m)

Population (2020)
  - Total: 183
  - Density: 760/sq mi (300/km^{2})
- Time zone: UTC-6 (CST)
  - Summer (DST): UTC-5 (CDT)
- ZIP Code: 66532
- Area code: 785
- FIPS code: 20-60325
- GNIS ID: 2396391
- Website: City website

Robinson is a city in Brown County, Kansas, United States. As of the 2020 census, the population of the city was 183.

== History ==
Robinson had its start in the year 1871 by the building of the railroad through that territory. It was named to honor the first governor of the State of Kansas, Charles Robinson. It had formerly been known locally as Lickskillet derived from the practice of an old trapper who allegedly put his dirty dishes out for his dog to lick clean.

== Geography ==
Robinson is located along the Wolf River.

According to the United States Census Bureau, the city has a total area of 0.24 square miles (0.62 km^{2}), all land.

== Demographics ==
Historical population
Census	Pop.	Note	%±
1880	210		—
1900	493		—
1910	492		−0.2%
1920	500		1.6%
1930	457		−8.6%
1940	413		−9.6%
1950	381		−7.7%
1960	317		−16.8%
1970	278		−12.3%
1980	324		16.5%
1990	268		−17.3%
2000	216		−19.4%
2010	234		8.3%
2020	183		−21.8%
U.S. Decennial Census

=== 2010 census ===
As of the census of 2010, there were 234 people, 92 households, and 64 families residing in the city. The population density was 975.0 inhabitants per square mile (376.4/km^{2}). There were 109 housing units at an average density of 454.2 per square mile (175.4/km^{2}). The racial makeup of the city was 92.7% White, 0.4% from other races, and 6.8% from two or more races. Hispanic or Latino of any race were 1.3% of the population.

There were 92 households, of which 37.0% had children under the age of 18 living with them, 56.5% were married couples living together, 8.7% had a female householder with no husband present, 4.3% had a male householder with no wife present, and 30.4% were non-families. 23.9% of all households were made up of individuals, and 14.1% had someone living alone who was 65 years of age or older. The average household size was 2.54 and the average family size was 2.97.

The median age in the city was 42.5 years. 26.1% of residents were under the age of 18; 6.4% were between the ages of 18 and 24; 20.1% were from 25 to 44; 31.7% were from 45 to 64; and 15.8% were 65 years of age or older. The gender makeup of the city was 50.4% male and 49.6% female.

=== 2000 census ===
As of the census of 2000, there were 216 people, 94 households, and 62 families residing in the city. The population density was 887.0 inhabitants per square mile (342.5/km^{2}). There were 111 housing units at an average density of 455.8 per square mile (176.0/km^{2}). The racial makeup of the city was 93.98% White, 0.46% Native American, 0.46% Asian, 1.85% from other races, and 3.24% from two or more races. Hispanic or Latino of any race were 1.85% of the population.

There were 94 households, out of which 30.9% had children under the age of 18 living with them, 55.3% were married couples living together, 7.4% had a female householder with no husband present, and 33.0% were non-families. 29.8% of all households were made up of individuals, and 20.2% had someone living alone who was 65 years of age or older. The average household size was 2.30 and the average family size was 2.81.

In the city, the population was spread out, with 24.1% under the age of 18, 6.0% from 18 to 24, 21.8% from 25 to 44, 26.4% from 45 to 64, and 21.8% who were 65 years of age or older. The median age was 44 years. For every 100 females, there were 116.0 males. For every 100 females age 18 and over, there were 97.6 males.

The median income for a household in the city was $20,938, and the median income for a family was $24,375. Males had a median income of $30,208 versus $16,364 for females. The per capita income for the city was $13,203. About 13.8% of families and 22.3% of the population were below the poverty line, including 39.1% of those under the age of eighteen and 22.2% of those 65 or over.

== Education ==
Robinson is a part of USD 415 Hiawatha Schools. The Hiawatha High School mascot is Hiawatha Red Hawks.

Robinson High School was closed through school unification. The Robinson High School mascot was Cardinals.

== Notable people ==
- James Breeding, U.S. Representative from Kansas.
- Martin Trapp, sixth governor of Oklahoma.
