= Irving Township, Kansas =

Irving Township
- Township
- Location in Brown County
- Coordinates: 39°56′15″N 095°24′31″W
- Country: United States
- State: Kansas
- County: Brown

Area
  - Total: 53.0 sq mi (137.3 km^{2})
  - Land: 52.99 sq mi (137.25 km^{2})
  - Water: 0.023 sq mi (0.06 km^{2}) 0.04%
- Elevation: 991 ft (302 m)

Population (2000)
  - Total: 311
  - Density: 6.0/sq mi (2.3/km^{2})
- GNIS feature ID: 0472788

Irving Township is a township in Brown County, Kansas, United States. As of the 2000 census, its population was 311.

== History ==
The first white settlement at Irving Township was made in 1855.

== Geography ==
Irving Township covers an area of 53.01 square miles (137.3 km^{2}) and contains no incorporated settlements. According to the USGS, it contains three cemeteries: Kenyon, Partlow and Tesson.

The stream of Lost Shirt Creek runs through this township.
