= Kickapoo Tribal Center, Kansas =

Unincorporated community in Brown County, Kansas

- CDP
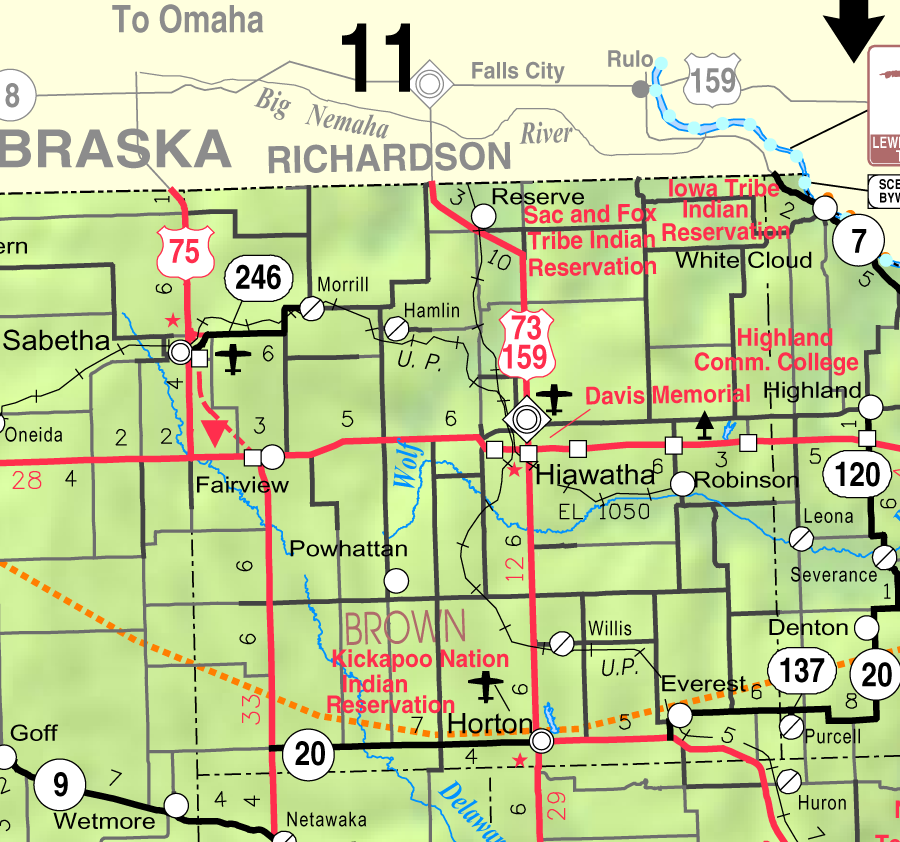
- KDOT map of Brown County (legend)

- Location within Kansas Location within the United States
- Coordinates: 39°40′15″N 95°38′29″W
- Country: United States
- State: Kansas
- County: Brown

Area
  - Total: 1.9 sq mi (5.0 km^{2})
  - Land: 1.9 sq mi (5.0 km^{2})
  - Water: 0 sq mi (0.0 km^{2})
- Elevation: 1,040 ft (320 m)

Population (2020)
  - Total: 177
  - Density: 92/sq mi (35/km^{2})
- Time zone: UTC-6 (CST)
  - Summer (DST): UTC-5 (CDT)
- Area code: 785
- FIPS code: 20-36744
- GNIS ID: 2583505

Kickapoo Tribal Center is a census-designated place (CDP) in Brown County, Kansas, United States, on the Kickapoo Indian Reservation. As of the 2020 census, the population was 177, making it the most populous location within the reservation.

== Geography ==
Kickapoo Tribal Center is located in southwest Brown County in the southeastern part of the Kickapoo Reservation. It is 6 miles (10 km) west of Horton. According to the United States Census Bureau, the CDP has a total area of 1.9 square miles (5.0 km^{2}), all land.

== Demographics ==
Historical population
Census	Pop.	Note	%±
2010	194		—
2020	177		−8.8%
U.S. Decennial Census

The 2020 United States census counted 177 people, 67 households, and 45 families in Kickapoo Tribal Center. The population density was 91.5 per square mile (35.3/km^{2}). There were 73 housing units at an average density of 37.7 per square mile (14.6/km^{2}). The racial makeup was 9.04% (16) white or European American (9.04% non-Hispanic white), 0.0% (0) black or African-American, 87.57% (155) Native American or Alaska Native, 0.0% (0) Asian, 0.0% (0) Pacific Islander or Native Hawaiian, 0.0% (0) from other races, and 3.39% (6) from two or more races. Hispanic or Latino of any race was 3.95% (7) of the population.

Of the 67 households, 34.3% had children under the age of 18; 26.9% were married couples living together; 41.8% had a female householder with no spouse or partner present. 28.4% of households consisted of individuals and 9.0% had someone living alone who was 65 years of age or older. The average household size was 2.7 and the average family size was 3.6. The percent of those with a bachelor's degree or higher was estimated to be 7.3% of the population.

29.9% of the population was under the age of 18, 6.8% from 18 to 24, 22.0% from 25 to 44, 24.3% from 45 to 64, and 16.9% who were 65 years of age or older. The median age was 38.5 years. For every 100 females, there were 113.3 males. For every 100 females ages 18 and older, there were 103.3 males.

The 2016–2020 5-year American Community Survey estimates show that the median household income was $27,188 (with a margin of error of +/- $13,041) and the median family income was $61,750 (+/- $15,194). Males had a median income of $13,125 (+/- $5,942) versus $19,167 (+/- $15,470) for females. The median income for those above 16 years old was $13,625 (+/- $8,296). Approximately, 12.1% of families and 52.3% of the population were below the poverty line, including 63.6% of those under the age of 18 and 10.0% of those ages 65 or over.
