= Hiawatha Township, Kansas =

Hiawatha Township
- Township
- Location in Brown County
- Coordinates: 39°50′35″N 095°33′01″W
- Country: United States
- State: Kansas
- County: Brown

Area
  - Total: 63.57 sq mi (164.64 km^{2})
  - Land: 63.45 sq mi (164.34 km^{2})
  - Water: 0.11 sq mi (0.29 km^{2}) 0.18%
- Elevation: 1,135 ft (346 m)

Population (2000)
  - Total: 739
  - Density: 12/sq mi (4.5/km^{2})
- GNIS feature ID: 0472777

Hiawatha Township is a township in Brown County, Kansas, United States. As of the 2000 census, its population was 739.

== History ==
Hiawatha Township was formed in 1872.

== Geography ==
Hiawatha Township covers an area of 63.57 square miles (164.6 km^{2}) and contains one incorporated settlement, Hiawatha (the county seat). According to the USGS, it contains one cemetery, Mount Hope.

The stream of North Fork Wolf River runs through this township.

== Transportation ==
Hiawatha Township contains two airports or landing strips: Davis Airfield and Hiawatha Municipal Airport.
