= Reserve, Kansas =

City in Brown County, Kansas

- City
- Location within Brown County and Kansas

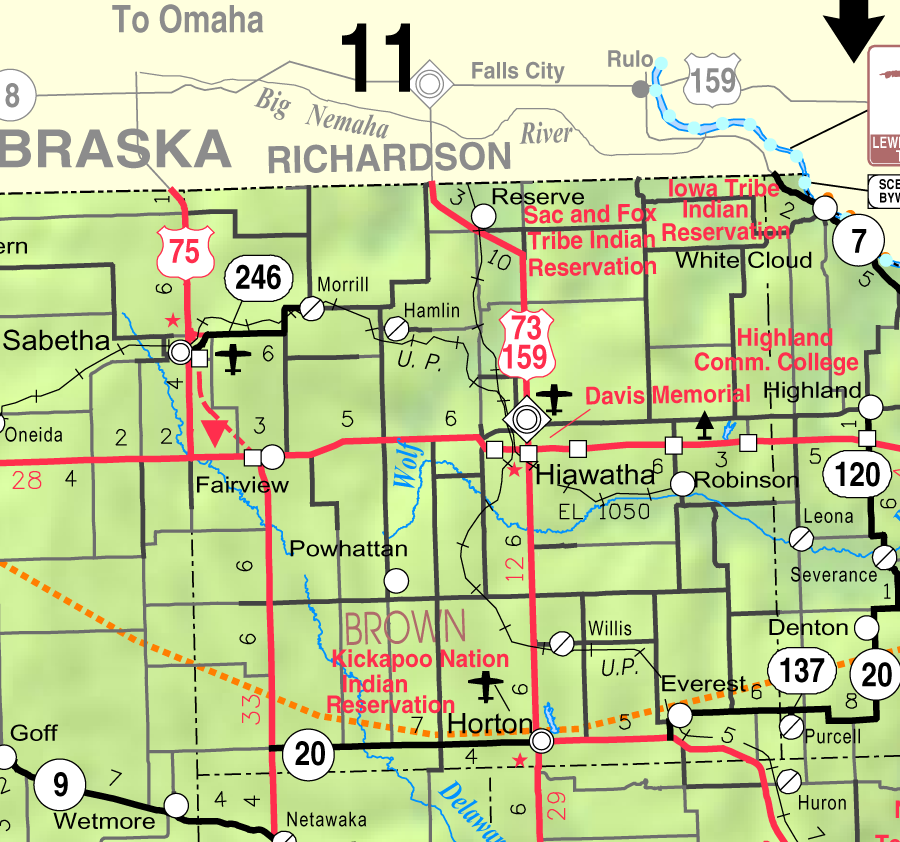
- KDOT map of Brown County (legend)
- Coordinates: 39°58′37″N 95°33′54″W
- Country: United States
- State: Kansas
- County: Brown
- Founded: 1880s
- Incorporated: 1913
- Named for: Indian reservation

Area
  - Total: 0.12 sq mi (0.30 km^{2})
  - Land: 0.12 sq mi (0.30 km^{2})
  - Water: 0 sq mi (0.00 km^{2})
- Elevation: 945 ft (288 m)

Population (2020)
  - Total: 67
  - Density: 580/sq mi (220/km^{2})
- Time zone: UTC-6 (CST)
  - Summer (DST): UTC-5 (CDT)
- ZIP Code: 66434
- Area code: 785
- FIPS code: 20-59050
- GNIS ID: 2396354

Reserve is a city in Brown County, Kansas, United States. As of the 2020 census, the population of the city was 67. It is located approximately 1.5 miles south of the Nebraska-Kansas border.

== History ==
A post office was opened in Reserve in 1882, and remained in operation until it was discontinued in 1983. The community was named from its location on a former Indian reservation.

== Geography ==
According to the United States Census Bureau, the city has a total area of 0.11 square miles (0.28 km^{2}), all land.

== Demographics ==
Historical population
Census	Pop.	Note	%±
1930	197		—
1940	172		−12.7%
1950	169		−1.7%
1960	138		−18.3%
1970	117		−15.2%
1980	105		−10.3%
1990	108		2.9%
2000	100		−7.4%
2010	84		−16.0%
2020	67		−20.2%
U.S. Decennial Census

=== 2020 census ===
The 2020 United States census counted 67 people, 36 households, and 18 families in Reserve. The population density was 582.6 per square mile (224.9/km^{2}). There were 50 housing units at an average density of 434.8 per square mile (167.9/km^{2}). The racial makeup was 67.16% (45) white or European American (67.16% non-Hispanic white), 1.49% (1) black or African-American, 22.39% (15) Native American or Alaska Native, 0.0% (0) Asian, 0.0% (0) Pacific Islander or Native Hawaiian, 0.0% (0) from other races, and 8.96% (6) from two or more races. Hispanic or Latino of any race was 0.0% (0) of the population.

Of the 36 households, 19.4% had children under the age of 18; 41.7% were married couples living together; 27.8% had a female householder with no spouse or partner present. 44.4% of households consisted of individuals and 22.2% had someone living alone who was 65 years of age or older. The average household size was 2.0 and the average family size was 2.7. The percent of those with a bachelor's degree or higher was estimated to be 1.5% of the population.

20.9% of the population was under the age of 18, 3.0% from 18 to 24, 16.4% from 25 to 44, 34.3% from 45 to 64, and 25.4% who were 65 years of age or older. The median age was 51.8 years. For every 100 females, there were 109.4 males. For every 100 females ages 18 and older, there were 130.4 males.

The 2016–2020 5-year American Community Survey estimates show that the median household income was $36,250 (with a margin of error of +/- $4,682) and the median family income was $37,083 (+/- $34,055). Males had a median income of $33,750 (+/- $8,983) versus $36,071 (+/- $967) for females. The median income for those above 16 years old was $35,625 (+/- $4,739). Approximately, 0.0% of families and 1.6% of the population were below the poverty line, including 0.0% of those under the age of 18 and 0.0% of those ages 65 or over.

=== 2010 census ===
As of the census of 2010, there were 84 people, 36 households, and 20 families residing in the city. The population density was 763.6 inhabitants per square mile (294.8/km^{2}). There were 58 housing units at an average density of 527.3 per square mile (203.6/km^{2}). The racial makeup of the city was 79.8% White, 1.2% African American, 13.1% Native American, and 6.0% from two or more races.

There were 36 households, of which 27.8% had children under the age of 18 living with them, 47.2% were married couples living together, 5.6% had a female householder with no husband present, 2.8% had a male householder with no wife present, and 44.4% were non-families. 33.3% of all households were made up of individuals, and 11.1% had someone living alone who was 65 years of age or older. The average household size was 2.33 and the average family size was 3.15.

The median age in the city was 44.5 years. 27.4% of residents were under the age of 18; 2.4% were between the ages of 18 and 24; 20.3% were from 25 to 44; 38% were from 45 to 64; and 11.9% were 65 years of age or older. The gender makeup of the city was 45.2% male and 54.8% female.

=== 2000 census ===
As of the census of 2000, there were 100 people, 50 households, and 21 families residing in the city. The population density was 905.6 inhabitants per square mile (349.7/km^{2}). There were 60 housing units at an average density of 543.4 per square mile (209.8/km^{2}). The racial makeup of the city was 82.00% White, 1.00% African American, 16.00% Native American, and 1.00% from two or more races.

There were 50 households, out of which 24.0% had children under the age of 18 living with them, 34.0% were married couples living together, 6.0% had a female householder with no husband present, and 58.0% were non-families. 48.0% of all households were made up of individuals, and 22.0% had someone living alone who was 65 years of age or older. The average household size was 2.00 and the average family size was 3.10.

In the city, the population was spread out, with 22.0% under the age of 18, 8.0% from 18 to 24, 28.0% from 25 to 44, 21.0% from 45 to 64, and 21.0% who were 65 years of age or older. The median age was 42 years. For every 100 females, there were 122.2 males. For every 100 females age 18 and over, there were 122.9 males.

The median income for a household in the city was $13,333, and the median income for a family was $28,125. Males had a median income of $22,188 versus $18,958 for females. The per capita income for the city was $12,343. There were 6.7% of families and 24.7% of the population living below the poverty line, including no under eighteens and 42.9% of those over 64.

== Education ==
Reserve is a part of USD 415 Hiawatha Schools. The Hiawatha High School mascot is Hiawatha Hawks.

Reserve schools were closed through school unification. The Reserve High School mascot was Reserve Elks.
