= Kickapoo Site 7, Kansas =

Unincorporated community in Brown County, Kansas

- CDP
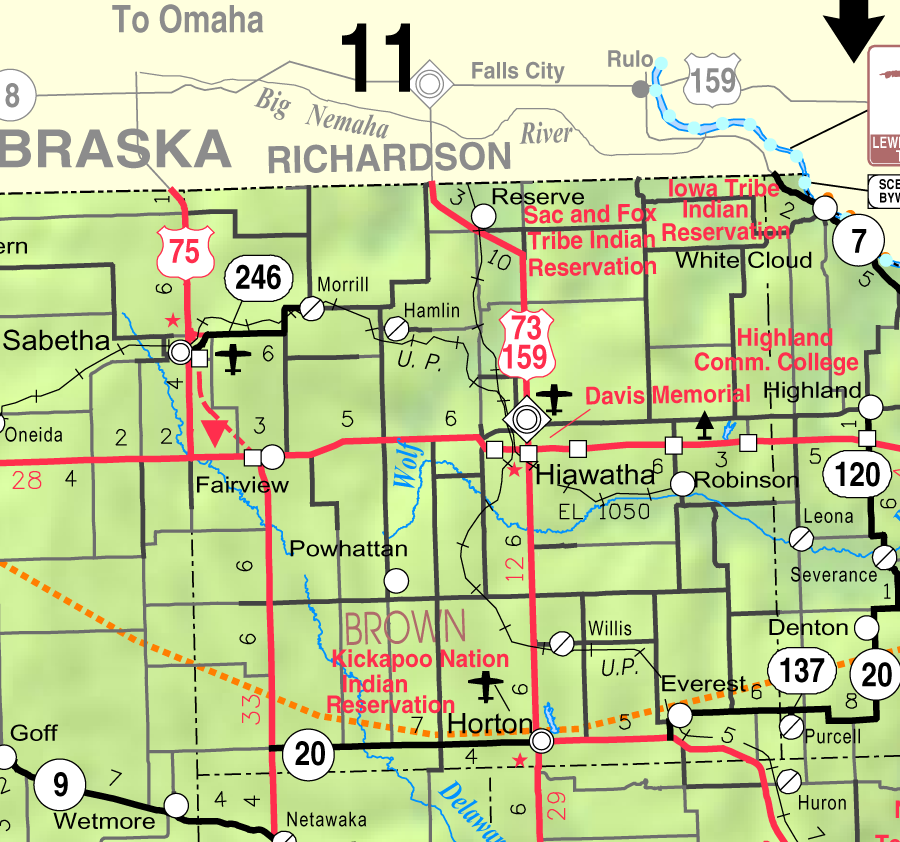
- KDOT map of Brown County (legend)

- Location within Kansas Location within the United States
- Coordinates: 39°41′42″N 95°40′12″W
- Country: United States
- State: Kansas
- County: Brown

Area
  - Total: 0.50 sq mi (1.3 km^{2})
  - Land: 0.50 sq mi (1.3 km^{2})
  - Water: 0 sq mi (0.0 km^{2})
- Elevation: 1,063 ft (324 m)

Population (2020)
  - Total: 104
  - Density: 210/sq mi (80/km^{2})
- Time zone: UTC-6 (CST)
  - Summer (DST): UTC-5 (CDT)
- Area code: 785
- FIPS code: 20-36741
- GNIS ID: 2583504

Kickapoo Site 7 is a census-designated place (CDP) in Brown County, Kansas, United States, on the Kickapoo Indian Reservation. As of the 2020 census, the population was 104.

== Geography ==
Kickapoo Site 7 is located in southwestern Brown County near the center of the Kickapoo Reservation. According to the United States Census Bureau, the CDP has a total area of 0.50 square miles (1.3 km^{2}), all land.

== Demographics ==
Historical population
Census	Pop.	Note	%±
2010	66		—
2020	104		57.6%
U.S. Decennial Census

The 2020 United States census counted 104 people, 25 households, and 15 families in Kickapoo Site 7. The population density was 205.1 per square mile (79.2/km^{2}). There were 29 housing units at an average density of 57.2 per square mile (22.1/km^{2}). The racial makeup was 2.88% (3) white or European American (2.88% non-Hispanic white), 0.0% (0) black or African-American, 91.35% (95) Native American or Alaska Native, 0.0% (0) Asian, 0.0% (0) Pacific Islander or Native Hawaiian, 0.0% (0) from other races, and 5.77% (6) from two or more races. Hispanic or Latino of any race was 12.5% (13) of the population.

Of the 25 households, 44.0% had children under the age of 18; 28.0% were married couples living together; 36.0% had a female householder with no spouse or partner present. 40.0% of households consisted of individuals and 20.0% had someone living alone who was 65 years of age or older. The average household size was 2.3 and the average family size was 3.0. The percent of those with a bachelor's degree or higher was estimated to be 0.0% of the population.

49.0% of the population was under the age of 18, 4.8% from 18 to 24, 22.1% from 25 to 44, 23.1% from 45 to 64, and 1.0% who were 65 years of age or older. The median age was 22.5 years. For every 100 females, there were 60.0 males. For every 100 females ages 18 and older, there were 43.2 males.

The 2016–2020 5-year American Community Survey estimates show that the median household income was $14,107 (with a margin of error of +/- $11,045). Males had a median income of $14,643 (+/- $12,497). The median income for those above 16 years old was $18,750 (+/- $12,064). Approximately, 57.1% of families and 67.2% of the population were below the poverty line, including 28.6% of those under the age of 18.
