= Willis, Kansas =

City in Brown County, Kansas

- City
- Location within Brown County and Kansas

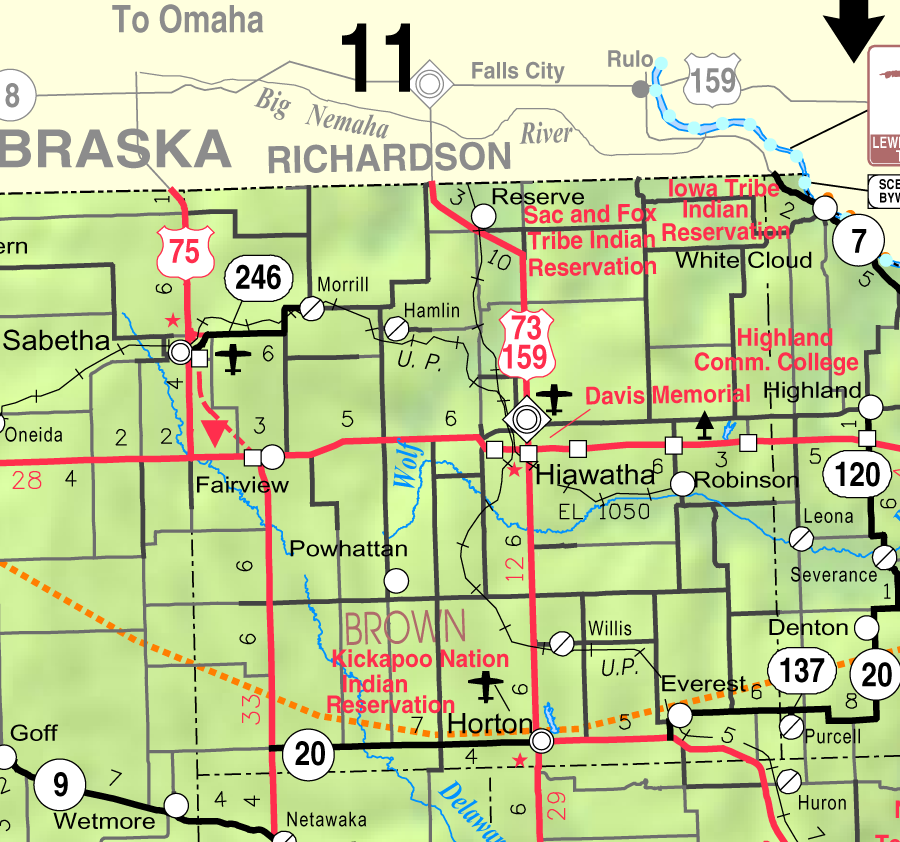
- KDOT map of Brown County (legend)
- Coordinates: 39°43′22″N 95°30′21″W
- Country: United States
- State: Kansas
- County: Brown
- Founded: 1880s
- Incorporated: 1893

Area
  - Total: 0.16 sq mi (0.42 km^{2})
  - Land: 0.16 sq mi (0.42 km^{2})
  - Water: 0 sq mi (0.00 km^{2})
- Elevation: 1,155 ft (352 m)

Population (2020)
  - Total: 24
  - Density: 150/sq mi (57/km^{2})
- Time zone: UTC-6 (CST)
  - Summer (DST): UTC-5 (CDT)
- ZIP Code: 66434
- Area code: 785
- FIPS code: 20-79400
- GNIS ID: 2397322

Willis is a city in Brown County, Kansas, United States. As of the 2020 census, the population of the city was 24.

== History ==
Willis had its start as a station on the Missouri Pacific Railroad. A post office opened in Willis in 1882 and remained in operation until it was discontinued in 1960.

== Geography ==
According to the United States Census Bureau, the city has a total area of 0.17 square miles (0.44 km^{2}), all land.

== Demographics ==
Historical population
| Census | Pop. | Note | %± |
|---|---|---|---|
| 1900 | 187 | | — |
| 1910 | 188 | | 0.5% |
| 1920 | 197 | | 4.8% |
| 1930 | 217 | | 10.2% |
| 1940 | 160 | | −26.3% |
| 1950 | 140 | | −12.5% |
| 1960 | 109 | | −22.1% |
| 1970 | 82 | | −24.8% |
| 1980 | 85 | | 3.7% |
| 1990 | 86 | | 1.2% |
| 2000 | 69 | | −19.8% |
| 2010 | 38 | | −44.9% |
| 2020 | 24 | | −36.8% |
U.S. Decennial Census

=== 2000 census ===
As of the census of 2000, there were 69 people, 22 households, and 17 families residing in the city. The population density was 409.3 inhabitants per square mile (158.0/km^{2}). There were 29 housing units at an average density of 172.0 per square mile (66.4/km^{2}). The racial makeup of the city was 78.26% White, 5.80% African American, 13.04% Native American, and 2.90% from two or more races. Hispanic or Latino of any race were 8.70% of the population.

There were 22 households, out of which 45.5% had children under the age of 18 living with them, 63.6% were married couples living together, 9.1% had a female householder with no husband present, and 18.2% were non-families. 13.6% of all households were made up of individuals, and 4.5% had someone living alone who was 65 years of age or older. The average household size was 3.14 and the average family size was 3.56.

In the city, the population was spread out, with 34.8% under the age of 18, 10.1% from 18 to 24, 30.4% from 25 to 44, 18.8% from 45 to 64, and 5.8% who were 65 years of age or older. The median age was 32 years. For every 100 females, there were 91.7 males. For every 100 females age 18 and over, there were 104.5 males.

The median income for a household in the city was $28,125, and the median income for a family was $30,000. Males had a median income of $17,188 versus $17,188 for females. The per capita income for the city was $12,592. There were no families and 4.8% of the population living below the poverty line, including no under eighteens and none of those over 64.

=== 2010 census ===
As of the census of 2010, there were 38 people, 19 households, and 13 families residing in the city. The population density was 223.5 inhabitants per square mile (86.3/km^{2}). There were 27 housing units at an average density of 158.8 per square mile (61.3/km^{2}). The racial makeup of the city was 92.1% White, 2.6% Native American, and 5.3% from two or more races.

There were 19 households, of which 15.8% had children under the age of 18 living with them, 63.2% were married couples living together, 5.3% had a male householder with no wife present, and 31.6% were non-families. 31.6% of all households were made up of individuals, and 5.3% had someone living alone who was 65 years of age or older. The average household size was 2.00 and the average family size was 2.46.

The median age in the city was 48.8 years. 13.2% of residents were under the age of 18; 7.8% were between the ages of 18 and 24; 18.4% were from 25 to 44; 36.9% were from 45 to 64; and 23.7% were 65 years of age or older. The gender makeup of the city was 47.4% male and 52.6% female.

== Education ==
Willis is served by South Brown County USD 430.

Willis High School was closed through school unification. The Willis High School mascot were the Pirates.
