= Kickapoo Site 6, Kansas =

Unincorporated community in Brown County, Kansas

- CDP
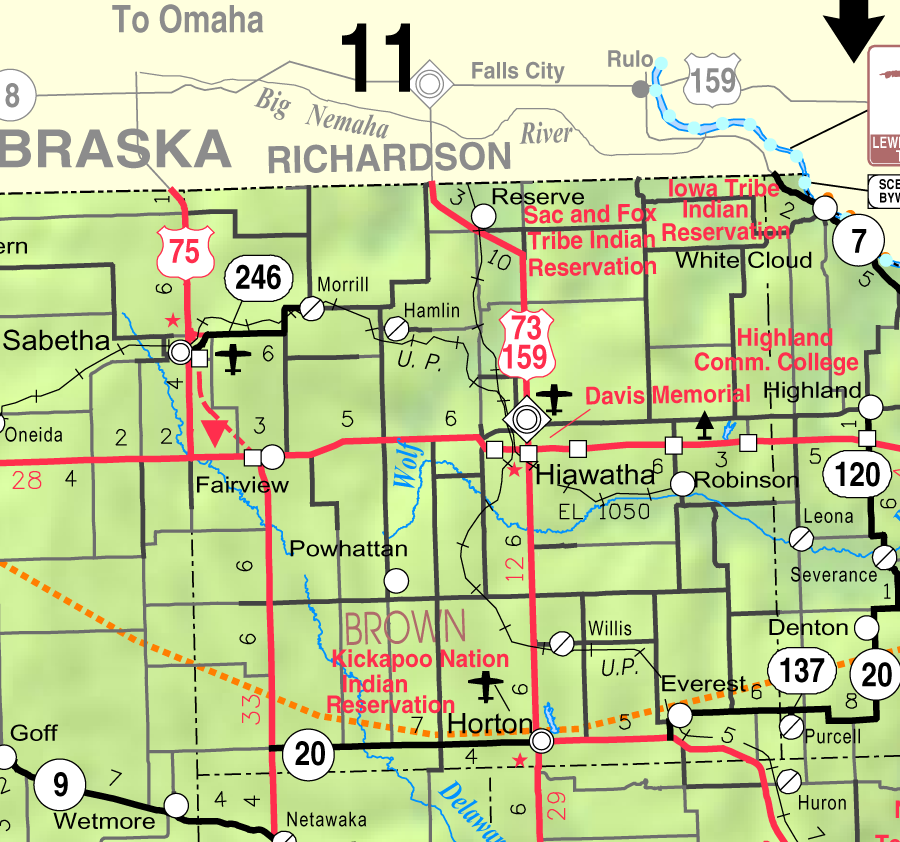
- KDOT map of Brown County (legend)

- Location within Kansas Location within the United States
- Coordinates: 39°41′44″N 95°41′30″W
- Country: United States
- State: Kansas
- County: Brown

Area
  - Total: 0.31 sq mi (0.8 km^{2})
  - Land: 0.31 sq mi (0.8 km^{2})
  - Water: 0 sq mi (0.0 km^{2})
- Elevation: 1,047 ft (319 m)

Population (2020)
  - Total: 13
  - Density: 42/sq mi (16/km^{2})
- Time zone: UTC-6 (CST)
  - Summer (DST): UTC-5 (CDT)
- Area code: 785
- FIPS code: 20-36740
- GNIS ID: 2583503

Kickapoo Site 6 is a census-designated place (CDP) in Brown County, Kansas, United States, on the Kickapoo Indian Reservation. As of the 2020 census, the population was 13.

== Geography ==
Kickapoo Site 6 is located in southwestern Brown County in the western part of the Kickapoo Reservation. According to the United States Census Bureau, the CDP has a total area of 0.31 square miles (0.8 km^{2}), all land.

== Demographics ==
Historical population
| Census | Pop. | Note | %± |
|---|---|---|---|
| 2010 | 15 | | — |
| 2020 | 13 | | −13.3% |
U.S. Decennial Census

The 2020 United States census counted 13 people, 5 households, and 4 families in Kickapoo Site 6. The population density was 41.8 per square mile (16.1/km^{2}). There were 5 housing units at an average density of 16.1 per square mile (6.2/km^{2}). The racial makeup was 23.08% (3) white or European American (23.08% non-Hispanic white), 0.0% (0) black or African-American, 30.77% (4) Native American or Alaska Native, 0.0% (0) Asian, 0.0% (0) Pacific Islander or Native Hawaiian, 0.0% (0) from other races, and 46.15% (6) from two or more races. Hispanic or Latino of any race was 23.08% (3) of the population.

Of the 5 households, 40.0% had children under the age of 18; 0.0% were married couples living together; 20.0% had a female householder with no spouse or partner present. 0.0% of households consisted of individuals and 0.0% had someone living alone who was 65 years of age or older. The average household size was 7.7 and the average family size was 7.7. The percent of those with a bachelor's degree or higher was estimated to be 0.0% of the population.

23.1% of the population was under the age of 18, 0.0% from 18 to 24, 30.8% from 25 to 44, 15.4% from 45 to 64, and 30.8% who were 65 years of age or older. The median age was 33.5 years. For every 100 females, there were 62.5 males. For every 100 females ages 18 and older, there were 66.7 males.
