= Horton, Kansas =

City in Brown County, Kansas

- City
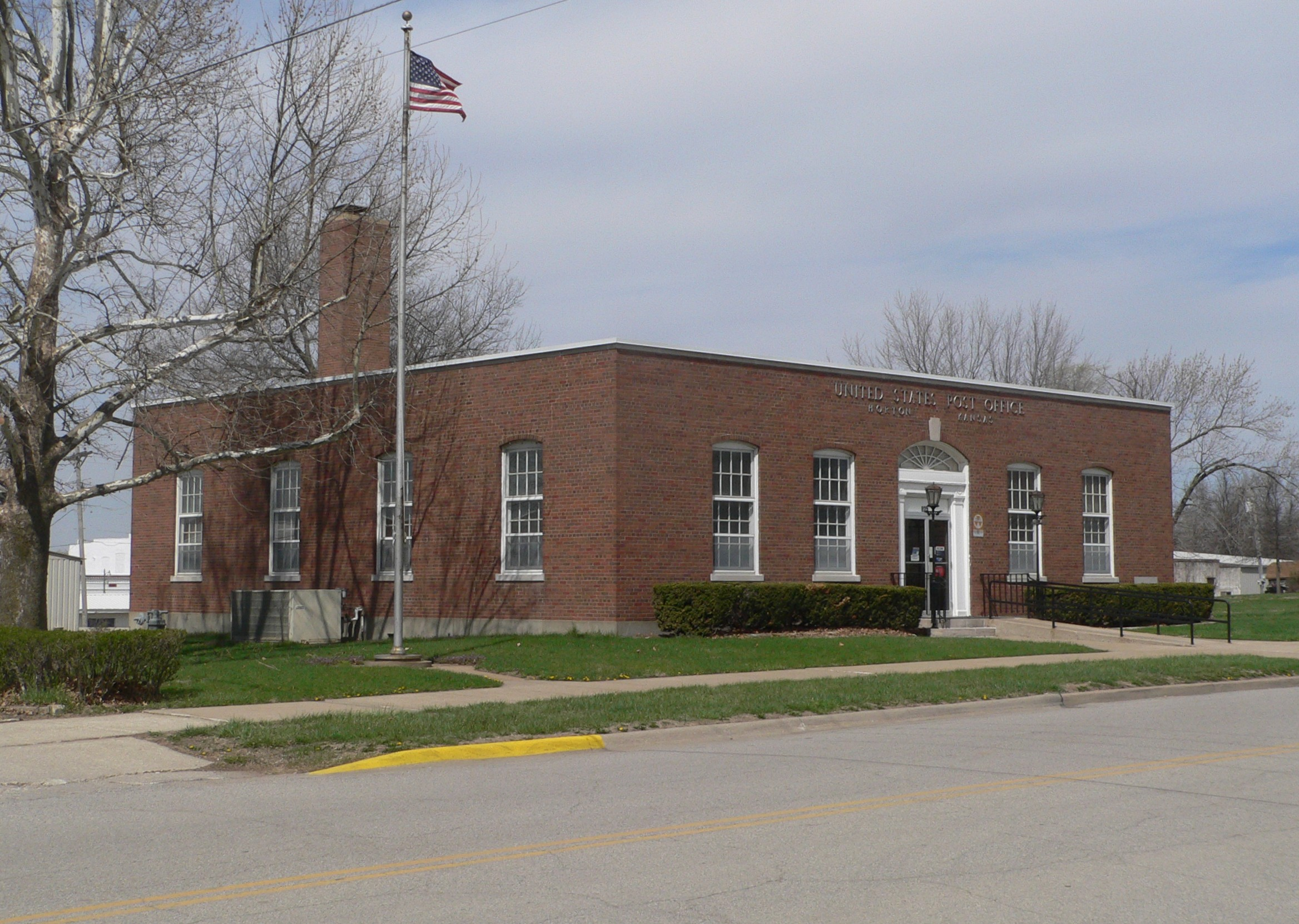
- Post Office in Horton (2015)

- Location within Brown County and Kansas

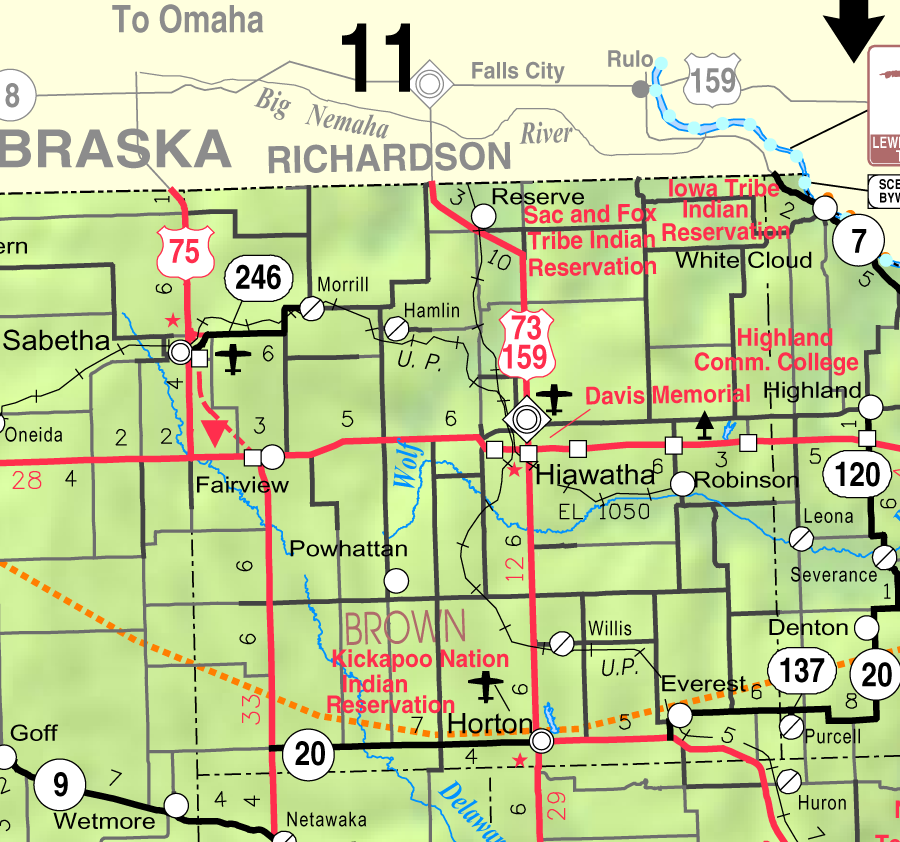
- KDOT map of Brown County (legend)
- Coordinates: 39°39′49″N 95°31′57″W
- Country: United States
- State: Kansas
- County: Brown
- Founded: 1886
- Incorporated: 1887
- Named for: Albert H. Horton

Area
  - Total: 1.68 sq mi (4.36 km^{2})
  - Land: 1.67 sq mi (4.32 km^{2})
  - Water: 0.015 sq mi (0.04 km^{2})
- Elevation: 1,053 ft (321 m)

Population (2020)
  - Total: 1,523
  - Density: 913/sq mi (353/km^{2})
- Time zone: UTC-6 (CST)
  - Summer (DST): UTC-5 (CDT)
- ZIP Code: 66439
- Area code: 785
- FIPS code: 20-33200
- GNIS ID: 485595
- Website: cityofhorton.com

Horton is a city in Brown County, Kansas, United States. As of the 2020 census, the population of the city was 1,523.

== History ==
Horton was founded in 1886. It was named for Albert H. Horton, chief justice of the Kansas Supreme Court.

On January 22, 2013, the host of CNBC television show The Profit toured Horton in hopes of revitalizing Horton's downtown business district. Within 18 months, the community started the "Reinvent Horton" campaign to clean up the community and update "run-down" aspects of it, including the installation of curbs, sidewalks, and light poles, razed some buildings, and a large community effort to try to change Horton.

== Geography ==
According to the United States Census Bureau, the city has a total area of 1.80 square miles (4.66 km^{2}), of which 1.78 square miles (4.61 km^{2}) is land and 0.02 square miles (0.05 km^{2}) is water.

=== Climate ===
Humid continental climate is a climatic region typified by large seasonal temperature differences, with warm to hot (and often humid) summers and cold (sometimes severely cold) winters. The Köppen Climate Classification subtype for this climate is "Dfa". (Hot Summer Continental Climate).

Climate data for Horton, Kansas (1991–2020 normals, extremes 1891–present)
Month	Jan	Feb	Mar	Apr	May	Jun	Jul	Aug	Sep	Oct	Nov	Dec	Year
Record high °F (°C)	74 (23)	82 (28)	94 (34)	96 (36)	104 (40)	108 (42)	111 (44)	112 (44)	109 (43)	96 (36)	84 (29)	74 (23)	112 (44)
Mean maximum °F (°C)	60.7 (15.9)	65.5 (18.6)	78.4 (25.8)	84.8 (29.3)	90.3 (32.4)	94.8 (34.9)	99.2 (37.3)	97.7 (36.5)	92.5 (33.6)	86.4 (30.2)	73.1 (22.8)	63.0 (17.2)	100.7 (38.2)
Mean daily maximum °F (°C)	36.9 (2.7)	42.6 (5.9)	54.0 (12.2)	64.4 (18.0)	75.1 (23.9)	84.1 (28.9)	88.4 (31.3)	86.8 (30.4)	79.5 (26.4)	67.3 (19.6)	52.6 (11.4)	40.7 (4.8)	64.4 (18.0)
Daily mean °F (°C)	26.3 (−3.2)	31.1 (−0.5)	41.9 (5.5)	52.8 (11.6)	64.2 (17.9)	73.8 (23.2)	78.1 (25.6)	75.8 (24.3)	67.6 (19.8)	54.6 (12.6)	41.3 (5.2)	30.6 (−0.8)	53.2 (11.8)
Mean daily minimum °F (°C)	15.7 (−9.1)	19.6 (−6.9)	29.9 (−1.2)	41.3 (5.2)	53.3 (11.8)	63.6 (17.6)	67.7 (19.8)	64.8 (18.2)	55.8 (13.2)	42.0 (5.6)	29.9 (−1.2)	20.4 (−6.4)	42.0 (5.6)
Mean minimum °F (°C)	−5.2 (−20.7)	2.4 (−16.4)	11.9 (−11.2)	25.5 (−3.6)	37.7 (3.2)	49.9 (9.9)	56.8 (13.8)	54.0 (12.2)	39.7 (4.3)	25.6 (−3.6)	14.0 (−10.0)	2.9 (−16.2)	−8.0 (−22.2)
Record low °F (°C)	−33 (−36)	−26 (−32)	−18 (−28)	3 (−16)	26 (−3)	40 (4)	44 (7)	40 (4)	27 (−3)	11 (−12)	−5 (−21)	−27 (−33)	−33 (−36)
Average precipitation inches (mm)	0.76 (19)	1.28 (33)	2.13 (54)	3.82 (97)	5.23 (133)	4.77 (121)	5.42 (138)	4.27 (108)	3.71 (94)	3.25 (83)	1.81 (46)	1.49 (38)	37.94 (964)
Average snowfall inches (cm)	2.8 (7.1)	2.9 (7.4)	0.9 (2.3)	0.2 (0.51)	0.0 (0.0)	0.0 (0.0)	0.0 (0.0)	0.0 (0.0)	0.0 (0.0)	0.2 (0.51)	0.6 (1.5)	3.1 (7.9)	10.7 (27)
Average precipitation days (≥ 0.01 in)	4.7	5.6	6.8	9.8	11.2	9.8	9.4	8.4	7.5	7.3	5.5	4.6	90.6
Average snowy days (≥ 0.1 in)	1.5	1.7	0.7	0.2	0.0	0.0	0.0	0.0	0.0	0.2	0.5	1.2	6.0
Source: NOAA

== Demographics ==
Historical population
Census	Pop.	Note	%±
1890	3,316		—
1900	3,398		2.5%
1910	3,600		5.9%
1920	4,009		11.4%
1930	4,049		1.0%
1940	2,872		−29.1%
1950	2,354		−18.0%
1960	2,361		0.3%
1970	2,177		−7.8%
1980	2,130		−2.2%
1990	1,885		−11.5%
2000	1,967		4.4%
2010	1,776		−9.7%
2020	1,523		−14.2%
U.S. Decennial Census

=== 2020 census ===
As of the 2020 census, Horton had a population of 1,523, with 638 households and 369 families. The population density was 859.0 per square mile (331.7/km^{2}). There were 813 housing units at an average density of 458.5 per square mile (177.0/km^{2}).

The median age was 42.5 years. 21.9% of residents were under the age of 18 and 22.7% were 65 years of age or older. The age distribution was 6.8% from 18 to 24, 23.6% from 25 to 44, and 25.1% from 45 to 64. For every 100 females there were 100.9 males, and for every 100 females age 18 and over there were 94.1 males age 18 and over.

0.0% of residents lived in urban areas, while 100.0% lived in rural areas.

Of all households, 26.6% had children under the age of 18 living in them. 39.2% were married-couple households, 21.5% were households with a male householder and no spouse or partner present, and 31.7% were households with a female householder and no spouse or partner present. 35.3% of households were made up of individuals, and 18.3% had someone living alone who was 65 years of age or older.

Of all housing units, 21.5% were vacant. The homeowner vacancy rate was 3.3% and the rental vacancy rate was 12.3%.

Racial composition as of the 2020 census
Race	Number	Percent
White	1,202	78.9%
Black or African American	22	1.4%
American Indian and Alaska Native	151	9.9%
Asian	12	0.8%
Native Hawaiian and Other Pacific Islander	1	0.1%
Some other race	19	1.2%
Two or more races	116	7.6%
Hispanic or Latino (of any race)	93	6.1%

=== Demographic estimates ===
The average household size was 2.5 and the average family size was 3.0. The percent of those with a bachelor's degree or higher was estimated to be 9.1% of the population.

=== Income and poverty ===
The 2016–2020 5-year American Community Survey estimates show that the median household income was $41,250 (with a margin of error of +/- $2,713) and the median family income was $48,095 (+/- $3,562). Males had a median income of $31,853 (+/- $3,041) versus $21,867 (+/- $921) for females. The median income for those above 16 years old was $25,577 (+/- $1,832). Approximately, 17.0% of families and 21.1% of the population were below the poverty line, including 30.5% of those under the age of 18 and 13.6% of those ages 65 or over.

=== 2010 census ===
As of the census of 2010, there were 1,776 people, 732 households, and 453 families residing in the city. The population density was 997.8 inhabitants per square mile (385.3/km^{2}). There were 904 housing units at an average density of 507.9 per square mile (196.1/km^{2}). The racial makeup of the city was 82.5% White, 0.8% African American, 10.7% Native American, 0.5% Asian, 0.8% from other races, and 4.6% from two or more races. Hispanic or Latino of any race were 3.7% of the population.

There were 732 households, of which 31.8% had children under the age of 18 living with them, 40.8% were married couples living together, 14.5% had a female householder with no husband present, 6.6% had a male householder with no wife present, and 38.1% were non-families. 34.3% of all households were made up of individuals, and 16.7% had someone living alone who was 65 years of age or older. The average household size was 2.38 and the average family size was 3.02.

The median age in the city was 38.3 years. 27.5% of residents were under the age of 18; 8.3% were between the ages of 18 and 24; 21.2% were from 25 to 44; 22.8% were from 45 to 64; and 20.2% were 65 years of age or older. The gender makeup of the city was 48.5% male and 51.5% female.

== Education ==
The community is served by South Brown County USD 430 public school district.

- Horton High School

== Notable people ==
- Boots Adams, businessman
- Robert Harder, Kansas legislator
