= K-20 (Kansas highway) =

State highway in Kansas, U.S.

K-20
- K-20 highlighted in red

Route information
- Maintained by KDOT and the city of Horton
- Length: 37.210 mi (59.884 km)
- Existed: c. 1928–present

Major junctions
- West end: US-75 in the Kickapoo Nation Indian Reservation
- US-159 in Horton; US-73 from Horton to Everest
- East end: K-7 southwest of Troy

Location
- Country: United States
- State: Kansas
- Counties: Brown, Doniphan

Highway system
- Kansas State Highway System; Interstate; US; State; Spurs
← K-19	→ K-21

K-20 is a 37.21-mile-long (59.88 km) west–east state highway in the northeastern part of the U.S. state of Kansas. It connects U.S. Route 75 (US-75) in the Kickapoo Nation Indian Reservation with K-7 southwest of Troy. Along the way, K-20 intersects several major highways, including U.S. Route 159 in Horton, and overlaps U.S. Route 73 from Horton to south of Everest. Northeast of Denton, the highway intersects K-120, which travels north to Severance and Highland. K-20 travels through mostly rural farmlands and is a two-lane highway its entire length.

Before state highways were numbered in Kansas, there were auto trails. K-20 overlaps the former Capitol Route near Horton. From Horton to south of Everest, the highway overlaps the former George Washington National Highway and King of Trails. The section from K-120 to Bendena overlaps the former Pikes Peak Ocean to Ocean Highway. K-20 was established by 1928, and at that time ran from US-73E south of Everest east to K-16 south of Troy. On July 11, 1956, it was approved to extend K-20 from US-73 west to US-75 as soon as the county had improved the roadway. Then by August 1956, the county had finished the required projects and it was officially extended.

== Route description ==
K-20's western terminus is at US-75 north of Holton on the border of the Kickapoo Indian Reservation. The highway proceeds east through mostly open pastures with some small forested areas to a crossing over the Delaware River. K-20 then passes through a group of houses and reaches Goldfinch Road at the Kickapoo Tribal Center. The roadway continues east through rural grasslands and soon reaches an intersection with Hazelnut Drive, which marks the eastern border of the reservation. The highway soon intersects Horned Owl Road, which travels north to Mercier, before reaching a crossing over Grasshopper Creek.

The highway continues a short distance before entering Horton as 15th Street. Within the city, K-20 intersects and begins to overlap with US-73 and US-159. The three highways continue for approximately 420 feet (130 m) where US-159 turns south, as K-20 and K-73 continue east. The two highways then pass Municipal Reservoir and cross Mission Creek, as the highway exits the city. The two routes proceed east through open farmlands to a point where K-20 turns north toward Everest as US-73 continues east. K-20 continues north for a short distance before entering Everest as 5th Street. The highway proceeds through the city to Main Street, where it turns east and crosses a Union Pacific Railway track. The highway then exits the city and curves north at Racoon Road. The roadway curves back east and proceeds through open farmland before entering into Doniphan County.

Just past the county line, the highway intersects K-137 which travels south to Purcell. K-20 continues east to Black Jack Road, where it shifts 0.5 miles (0.80 km) south, before curving back east. It proceeds through rural farmlands to Coronado Road and 115th Street where it curves north. The highway continues north through flat rural farmland with scattered areas of trees to a crossing over the North Branch Independence River. K-20 continues north, passing along the east border of Denton before curving east at 160th Road. The roadway continues east to a junction with K-120, which travels north to Severance. K-20 passes by Doniphan West Elementary School and continues east to Bendena. The highway continues through rural farmland for a short distance before reaching its eastern terminus at K-7 southwest of Troy.

In 2018, the Kansas Department of Transportation (KDOT) determined that on average the traffic varied from 190 vehicles per day near slightly east of Purcell to 2,910 vehicles per day slightly east of Horton along the overlap with US-73. K-20 is not included in the National Highway System, (Note: The National Highway System is a system of highways important to the nation's defense, economy, and mobility.) but does connect to it at its western terminus.

== History ==
=== Early roads ===
Before state highways were numbered in Kansas there were auto trails, which were an informal network of marked routes that existed in the United States and Canada in the early part of the 20th century. K-20 overlaps the former Capital Route from Horned Owl Road to Horton. From Horton to south of Everest, the highway overlaps the former George Washington National Highway which ran from Savannah to Seattle, and King of Trails which ran from Galveston and San Antonio north to Winnipeg. The section from K-120 to Bendena overlaps the former Pikes Peak Ocean to Ocean Highway, which was formed early in 1912, and travelled from New York City to Los Angeles.

=== Establishment and realignments ===
K-20 was established by the Kansas State Highway Commission, now known as KDOT, by 1928, and at that time ran from US-73E south of Everest east through Denton and Severance to K-16 south of Troy. By 1934, US-73E was renumbered to US-73 and K-16 was decommissioned and became an extension of K-7. The section between Horton and the eastern terminus was paved in 1948. In a meeting on July 11, 1956, it was approved to extend K-20 from Horton west to US-75 as soon as the county had cleared brush and the ditches as well as fixing the slope of the roadway. By August 1956, the county had finished the required projects and in a meeting on August 9, 1956, it was approved and officially extended.

On July 12, 1950, the section of what is now K-20 from US-73 north to the city of Everest was established as K-114. The commission authorized relocations of US-73 from south of Everest to Huron and K-20 east of Everest through a resolution on August 12, 1964. Prior to this, US-73 followed Racoon Road and Douglas Road south to 326th Road, then followed 326th Road east to Huron. Additionally, K-20 ran north–south to the east of Everest along Racoon Road. At this time, K-20 was approved to be relocated to pass through Everest and assume the course of K-114. By 1967, K-114 had been replaced by K-20 when the relocation of US-73 was completed.

== Major intersections ==
County	Location	mi	km	Destinations	Notes
Brown	Powhattan Township	0.000	0.000	US-75 – Holton, Sabetha	Western terminus; road continues as 110th Street
Brown	Horton	10.856	17.471	US-73 / US-159 north (Central Avenue) – Hiawatha	Western end of US-73/US-159 concurrency
Brown	Horton	10.937	17.601	US-159 south (1st Avenue East) – Nortonville	Eastern end of US-159 concurrency
Brown	Everest	16.329	26.279	US-73 south – Atchison	Eastern end of US-73 concurrency
Doniphan	Union Township	22.310	35.904	K-137 south – Purcell	Northern terminus of K-137
Doniphan	Union–Wolf River township line	31.800	51.177	K-120 north – Highland	Southern terminus of K-120
Doniphan	Independence–Center township line	37.210	59.884	K-7 (Glacial Hills Scenic Byway) – Troy, Atchison	Eastern terminus; road continues as 160th Road
1.000 mi = 1.609 km; 1.000 km = 0.621 mi: Concurrency terminus
