= K-120 (Kansas highway) =

State highway in Kansas, U.S.

K-120
- K-120 highlighted in red

Route information
- Maintained by KDOT
- Length: 9.126 mi (14.687 km)
- Existed: June 5, 1945–present

Major junctions
- South end: K-20 south of Severance
- US-36 south of Highland
- North end: Kansas Street at Highland city line

Location
- Country: United States
- State: Kansas
- Counties: Doniphan

Highway system
- Kansas State Highway System; Interstate; US; State; Spurs
← K-119	→ K-121

K-120 is a 9.126-mile-long (14.687 km) north–south state highway in the U.S. state of Kansas. K-120's southern terminus is at K-20 south of the city of Severance and the northern terminus is a continuation as Kansas Street at the Highland city limits. Just south of its northern terminus it intersects U.S. Route 36 (US-36).

Before state highways were numbered in Kansas there were auto trails, K-120 follows the former Pikes Peak Ocean to Ocean Highway its entire length. K-120 was first designated on June 5, 1945, as a short spur from K-20 to Severance, then was extended northward to Highland by mid 1951.

== Route description ==
K-120 begins at an intersection with K-20 northeast of Denton and travels northward through small rolling hills covered in farmlands. After roughly 1.5 miles (2.4 km) it curves to the northwest and enters the city of Severance. It then curves west and begins to follow Church Street. The highway then turns onto Gove Street and continues north to an intersection with Power House Road. Here, it turns west and leaves the city then curves north again and crosses Wolf River, a tributary of the Missouri River. It continues north, passes Oak Hill Cemetery at an intersection with 185th Road, then curves west. The highway continues for 0.5 miles (0.80 km) then curves back north again. From here it continues north for roughly 3.8 miles (6.1 km) and intersects US-36 via a diamond interchange. From US-36 it continues north for roughly one mile (1.6 km) through more farmlands and crosses Mission Creek, a tributary of the Missouri River. Roughly 0.2 miles (0.32 km) north of Mission Creek, it ends at the Highland city limits and continues as Kansas Street.

The Kansas Department of Transportation (KDOT) tracks the traffic levels on its highways, and in 2017, they determined that on average the traffic varied from 450 vehicles per day near the southern terminus to 1380 vehicles per day between US-36 and the northern terminus. The entire route is paved with partial design bituminous pavement. K-120 is not included in the National Highway System. The National Highway System is a system of highways important to the nation's defense, economy, and mobility. K-120 does connect to the National Highway System at its junction with US-36.

== History ==
Before state highways were numbered in Kansas there were auto trails, which were an informal network of marked routes that existed in the United States and Canada in the early part of the 20th century. K-120 follows the former Pikes Peak Ocean to Ocean Highway its entire length.

K-120 was first established as a state highway on June 5, 1945, as a 1.8 miles (2.9 km) spur from K-20 north to Severance. Then on May 9, 1951, K-120 was extended 6.702 miles (10.786 km) northward to end at US-36 in Highland. Then in 1985, US-36 was realigned to a new alignment south of Highland and in an October 7, 1985 resolution, K-120 was truncated 0.193 miles (0.311 km) to end at the Highland city limits when the new alignment of US-36 was finished. Included in that resolution is if Highland annexes more land surrounding K-120, that section would be removed from the state highway system.

== Major intersections ==
The entire route is in Doniphan County.

Location	mi	km	Destinations	Notes
Wolf River–Union township line	0.000	0.000	K-20 – Denton, Troy	Southern terminus
Iowa Township	8.933	14.376	US-36 – Troy, Hiawatha	Diamond interchange
Highland	9.126	14.687	Kansas Street	Northern terminus; continuation as Kansas Street at Highland city limits
1.000 mi = 1.609 km; 1.000 km = 0.621 mi
