= K-120 =

K-120 may refer to:

- K-120 (Kansas highway), a highway in Kansas
- K-120, a rating for hills indicating a construction point of 120
- K. 120, a Mozart movement
