= Ocean-to-Ocean Highway =

Ocean-to-Ocean Highway may refer to:

- National Old Trails Road
- Pikes Peak Ocean to Ocean Highway
