= Iowa Township, Doniphan County, Kansas =

Iowa Township
- Township
- Point of Beginning Marker for the 6th Principal Meridian at the KS/NE border

- Location in Doniphan County
- Coordinates: 39°55′55″N 095°17′01″W
- Country: United States
- State: Kansas
- County: Doniphan

Area
  - Total: 84.35 sq mi (218.46 km^{2})
  - Land: 83.46 sq mi (216.17 km^{2})
  - Water: 0.88 sq mi (2.29 km^{2}) 1.05%
- Elevation: 974 ft (297 m)

Population (2020)
  - Total: 1,433
  - Density: 17.17/sq mi (6.629/km^{2})
- GNIS feature ID: 0472806

Iowa Township is a township in Doniphan County, Kansas, United States. As of the 2020 census, its population was 1,433.

== Geography ==
Iowa Township covers an area of 84.35 square miles (218.5 km^{2}) and contains two incorporated settlements: Highland and White Cloud. According to the USGS, it contains six cemeteries: Fanning, Highland, Iola, Iowa Point, Martin and Olive Branch.

The streams of Cedar Creek, Coon Creek, Fox Creek, Mill Creek, Mission Creek, Pennell Creek, Squaw Creek, Striker Branch, and Wolf River run through this township.

== History ==
Iowa Township was organized in 1854. It was named for the Iowa people who lived there on the reservation.
