= Washington Township, Doniphan County, Kansas =

Washington Township
- Township
- Location in Doniphan County
- Coordinates: 39°47′08″N 094°57′16″W
- Country: United States
- State: Kansas
- County: Doniphan

Area
  - Total: 34.17 sq mi (88.49 km^{2})
  - Land: 32.70 sq mi (84.68 km^{2})
  - Water: 1.47 sq mi (3.81 km^{2}) 4.31%
- Elevation: 997 ft (304 m)

Population (2020)
  - Total: 2,927
  - Density: 89.52/sq mi (34.57/km^{2})
- GNIS ID: 0473051

Washington Township is a township in Doniphan County, Kansas, United States. As of the 2020 census, its population was 2,927.

== History ==
Washington Township was organized in 1855.

== Geography ==
Washington Township covers an area of 34.17 square miles (88.5 km^{2}) and contains two incorporated settlements: Elwood and Wathena. According to the USGS, it contains two cemeteries: Belmont and Tambor.

The streams of Duncan Creek and Peters Creek run through this township.
