= St. Joseph metropolitan area =

Metropolitan area in Kansas and Missouri, U.S.

- Metropolitan Statistical Area
- St. Joseph, MO–KS MSA
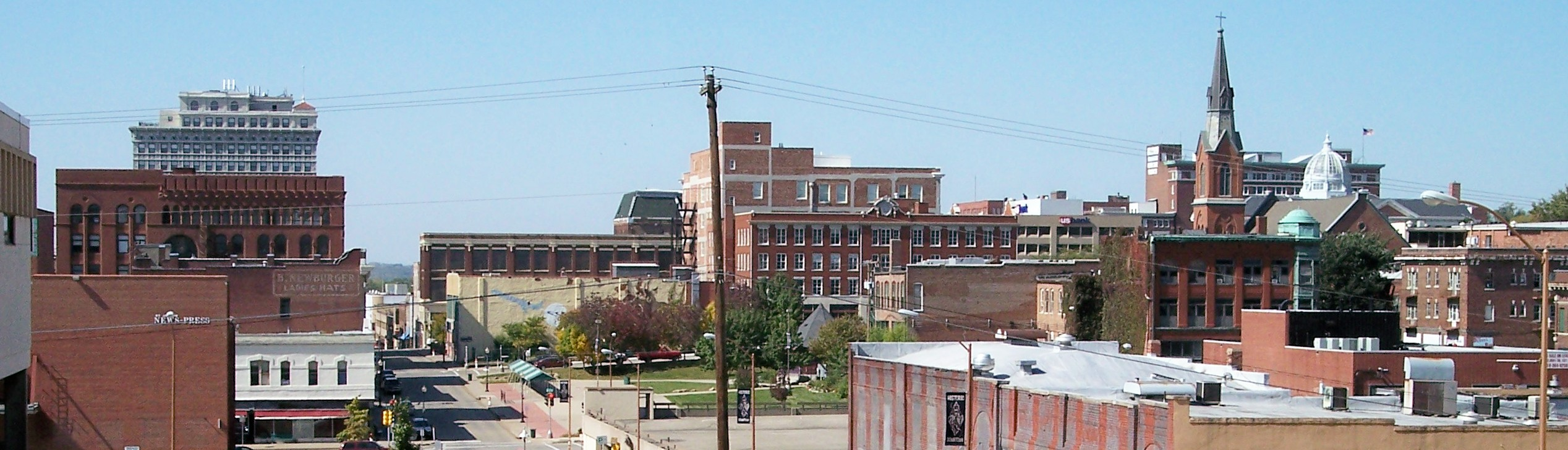
- View of downtown St. Joseph
Interactive Map of the St. Joseph, MO–KS MSA
St. Joseph, MO
St. Joseph, MO–KS MSA
Other Counties in the Kansas City, MO–KS CSA
- Coordinates: 39°50′03″N 94°47′02″W
- Country: United States
- State: Missouri; Kansas
- Largest city: St. Joseph, MO

Area
  - Total: 8,472 sq mi (21,940 km^{2})
- Highest elevation: 1,160 ft (353.5 m)
- Lowest elevation: 690 ft (210.3 m)

Population
  - Total: 2,192,035
  - Rank: 30th MSA (2,192,035), 24th CSA (2,528,644) in the U.S.
  - Density: 260/sq mi (100.4/km^{2})

GDP
  - MSA: $169.5 billion (2022)
- Time zone: UTC−06:00 (CST)
  - Summer (DST): UTC−05:00 (CDT)

The St. Joseph Metropolitan Statistical Area, as defined by the United States Census Bureau, is an area consisting of four counties - three in northwest Missouri (Andrew, Buchanan, and DeKalb) and one in northeast Kansas (Doniphan) - anchored by the city of St. Joseph, comprising a total area of 1,673.93 square miles (4,335.5 km^{2}). As of the 2020 census, the MSA had a population of 121,467. It is part of the wider Kansas City-Overland Park-Kansas City, MO-KS CSA.

== Counties ==
- Andrew County, Missouri
- Buchanan County, Missouri
- DeKalb County, Missouri
- Doniphan County, Kansas

== Communities ==
=== Places with more than 70,000 inhabitants ===
- St. Joseph, Missouri (Principal city) Pop: 72,473

=== Places with 1,000 to 10,000 inhabitants ===
- Cameron, Missouri (partial) Pop: 8,513
- Savannah, Missouri Pop: 5,069
- Country Club, Missouri Pop: 2,487
- Gower, Missouri (partial) Pop: 1,533
- Wathena, Kansas Pop: 1,246
- Elwood, Kansas Pop: 1,125
- Maysville, Missouri Pop: 1,095

=== Places with fewer than 999 inhabitants ===
- Troy, Kansas Pop: 964
- Highland, Kansas Pop: 903
- Stewartsville, Missouri Pop: 733
- Agency, Missouri Pop: 671
- Dearborn, Missouri (partial) Pop: 496
- Osborn, Missouri (partial) Pop: 423
- Union Star, Missouri Pop: 380
- Clarksdale, Missouri Pop: 245
- Amazonia, Missouri Pop: 238
- De Kalb, Missouri Pop: 233
- Easton, Missouri Pop: 227
- Rushville, Missouri Pop: 225
- Fillmore, Missouri Pop: 173
- Bolckow, Missouri Pop: 163
- Denton, Kansas Pop: 130
- Rosendale, Missouri Pop: 119
- White Cloud, Kansas Pop: 115
- Cosby, Missouri Pop: 114
- Lewis and Clark Village, Missouri Pop: 96
- Weatherby, Missouri Pop: 80
- Severance, Kansas Pop: 76
- Rea, Missouri Pop: 46
- Leona, Kansas Pop: 41
- Amity, Missouri Pop: 26

=== Unincorporated places ===
- Faucett, Missouri Pop: 248
- Bendena, Kansas Pop: 117
- Doniphan, Kansas
- Fairport, Missouri
- Helena, Missouri
- Nodaway, Missouri
- Rochester, Missouri
- Wallace, Missouri
- Whitesville, Missouri
- Willow Brook, Missouri

== Demographics ==
As of the census of 2000, there were 122,336 people, 46,531 households, and 31,203 families residing within the MSA. The racial makeup of the MSA was 93.29% White, 4.10% African American, 0.49% Native American, 0.38% Asian, 0.02% Pacific Islander, 0.53% from other races, and 1.20% from two or more races. Hispanic or Latino of any race were 2.00% of the population.

The median income for a household in the MSA was $34,896, and the median income for a family was $41,290. Males had a median income of $30,296 versus $21,085 for females. The per capita income for the MSA was $16,198.

== See also ==
- Missouri census statistical areas
- Kansas census statistical areas
- List of municipalities in Missouri
- List of cities in Kansas
