= Fanning, Kansas =

Unincorporated community in Doniphan County, Kansas

- Unincorporated community
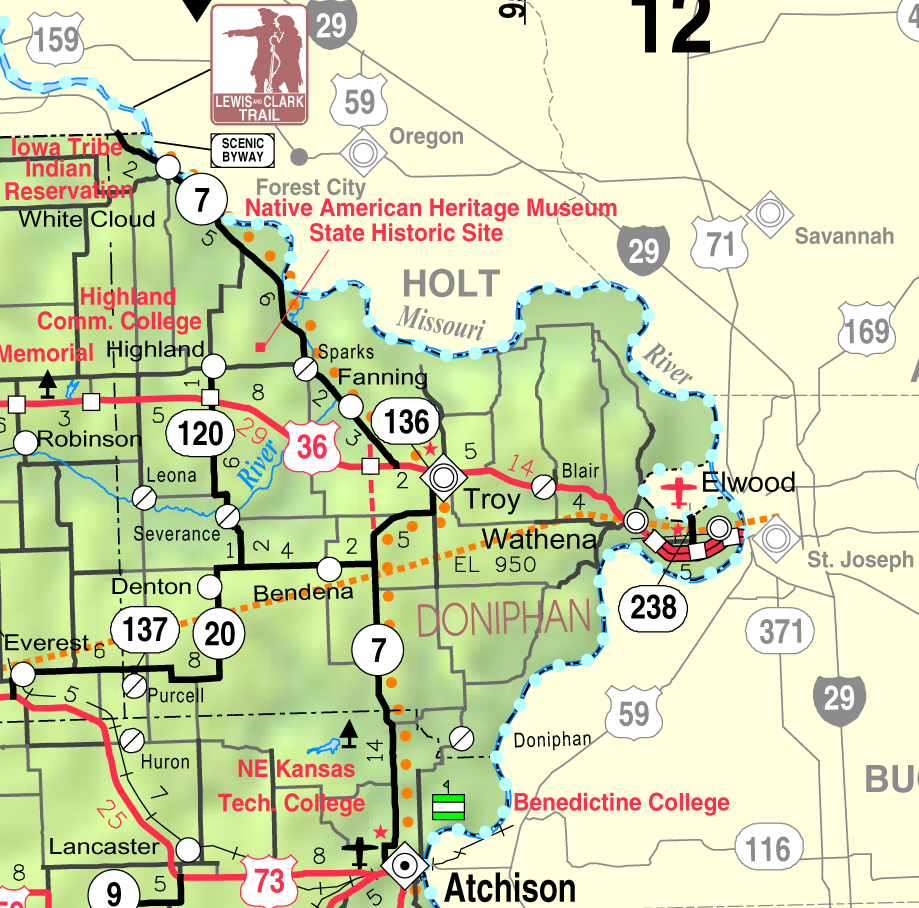
- KDOT map of Doniphan County (legend)

- Location within Kansas Location within the United States
- Coordinates: 39°50′05″N 95°09′41″W
- Country: United States
- State: Kansas
- County: Doniphan
- Founded: 1870
- Elevation: 883 ft (269 m)
- Time zone: UTC-6 (CST)
  - Summer (DST): UTC-5 (CDT)
- Area code: 785
- FIPS code: 20-22975
- GNIS ID: 473026

Fanning is an unincorporated community in Doniphan County, Kansas, United States. Fanning is located along K-7, 5 miles (8.0 km) northwest of Troy.

== History ==
Fanning got its start in the year 1870, following construction of the Burlington and Missouri River Railroad through that territory.

A post office was opened in Fanning in December 1870 and remained in operation until it was discontinued in July 1933.
