= Palermo (disambiguation) =

Palermo is the principal city and administrative seat of Sicily, Italy.

Palermo may also refer to:

== Places ==
- Palermo, Buenos Aires, neighborhood of the Argentine capital, Buenos Aires
  - Palermo (Buenos Aires Underground), a railway station
  - Palermo Woods, a major urban park often considered the city's green lungs
- Palermo, California
- Palermo, Huila, a town in Colombia
- Palermo, Kansas
- Palermo, Maine
- Palermo, Montevideo, neighborhood of the Uruguayan capital, Montevideo
- Palermo, New York
- Palermo, North Dakota
- Palermo, Ontario, former village merged into the town of Oakville, Ontario, Canada
- Province of Palermo, where the Sicilian city of Palermo is located

== Other uses ==
- Palermo (surname), including a list of people with the name.
- Palermo Bajo, Argentine sports club based in Córdoba
- Palermo's Pizza, pizza company from Milwaukee, Wisconsin
- Palermo (film), 1937 Argentine film
- Palermo (album), a 2023 album by Conway the Machine and Wun Two
- U.S. Città di Palermo, Italian football team which currently plays in Serie B
- Palermo Stone, archaeological find held by Regional Archeological Museum in the city of Palermo, Sicily
- Palermo scale, a measure of the potential impact hazard of near Earth objects
- Alto Palermo, shopping mall located in Buenos Aires, Argentina
- Parque Palermo, stadium in Montevideo, Uruguay
- Palermo, character of the Netflix television show Money Heist roled by Rodrigo de la Serna
