= Amity, Missouri =

- Village
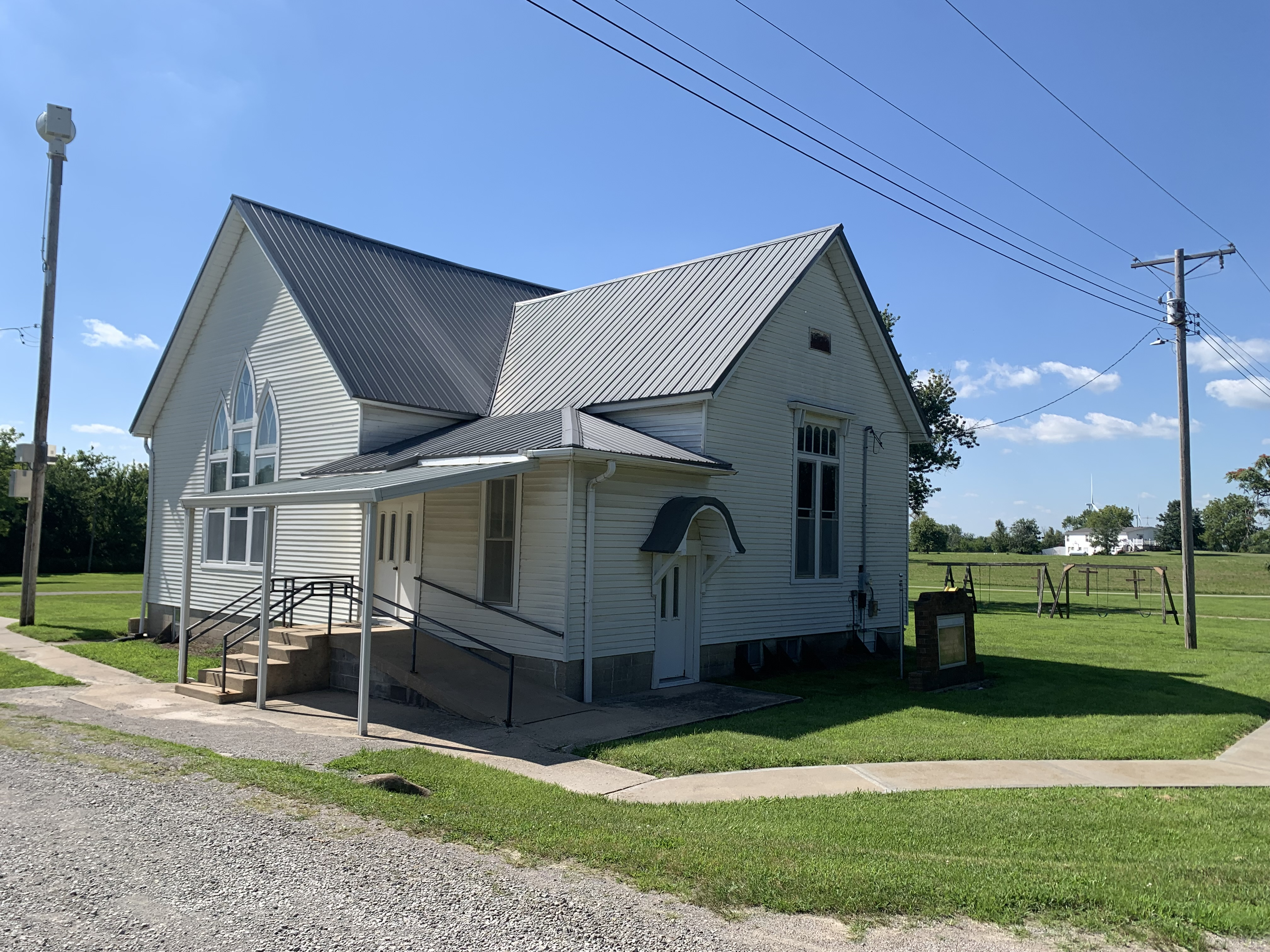
- Church in Amity

- Location of Amity, Missouri
- Coordinates: 39°52′06″N 94°26′07″W
- Country: United States
- State: Missouri
- County: DeKalb

Area
  - Total: 0.17 sq mi (0.45 km^{2})
  - Land: 0.17 sq mi (0.45 km^{2})
  - Water: 0 sq mi (0.00 km^{2})
- Elevation: 1,047 ft (319 m)

Population (2020)
  - Total: 26
  - Density: 150.4/sq mi (58.08/km^{2})
- Time zone: UTC-6 (Central (CST))
  - Summer (DST): UTC-5 (CDT)
- ZIP code: 64422
- Area code: 816
- FIPS code: 29-01054
- GNIS feature ID: 2397429

Amity is a village in DeKalb County, Missouri, United States. The population was 26 at the 2020 census. It is part of the St. Joseph, MO–KS Metropolitan Statistical Area.

== History ==
Amity was platted in 1870. A post office called Amity has been in operation since 1872.

== Geography ==
According to the United States Census Bureau, the village has a total area of 0.17 square miles (0.44 km^{2}), all land.

== Demographics ==
Historical population
Census	Pop.	Note	%±
1910	173		—
1920	174		0.6%
1930	149		−14.4%
1940	172		15.4%
1950	128		−25.6%
1960	111		−13.3%
1970	86		−22.5%
1980	74		−14.0%
1990	99		33.8%
2000	70		−29.3%
2010	54		−22.9%
2020	26		−51.9%
U.S. Decennial Census

=== 2010 census ===
As of the census of 2010, there were 54 people, 20 households, and 13 families residing in the village. The population density was 317.6 inhabitants per square mile (122.6/km^{2}). There were 31 housing units at an average density of 182.4 per square mile (70.4/km^{2}). The racial makeup of the village was 100.0% White.

There were 20 households, of which 20.0% had children under the age of 18 living with them, 65.0% were married couples living together, and 35.0% were non-families. 25.0% of all households were made up of individuals, and 15% had someone living alone who was 65 years of age or older. The average household size was 2.70 and the average family size was 3.38.

The median age in the village was 45.5 years. 16.7% of residents were under the age of 18; 13.1% were between the ages of 18 and 24; 18.6% were from 25 to 44; 42.6% were from 45 to 64; and 9.3% were 65 years of age or older. The gender makeup of the village was 53.7% male and 46.3% female.

=== 2000 census ===
As of the census of 2000, there were 70 people, 31 households, and 23 families residing in the town. The population density was 324.9 inhabitants per square mile (125.4/km^{2}). There were 36 housing units at an average density of 167.1 per square mile (64.5/km^{2}). The racial makeup of the town was 97.14% White, and 2.86% from two or more races.

There were 31 households, out of which 22.6% had children under the age of 18 living with them, 61.3% were married couples living together, 9.7% had a female householder with no husband present, and 25.8% were non-families. 25.8% of all households were made up of individuals, and 12.9% had someone living alone who was 65 years of age or older. The average household size was 2.26 and the average family size was 2.65.

In the town the population was spread out, with 21.4% under the age of 18, 8.6% from 18 to 24, 22.9% from 25 to 44, 24.3% from 45 to 64, and 22.9% who were 65 years of age or older. The median age was 42 years. For every 100 females, there were 84.2 males. For every 100 females age 18 and over, there were 96.4 males.

The median income for a household in the town was $25,625, and the median income for a family was $28,333. Males had a median income of $31,667 versus $23,750 for females. The per capita income for the town was $11,388. There were 16.7% of families and 18.2% of the population living below the poverty line, including 33.3% of under eighteens and none of those over 64.

== Education ==
Amity is within the Maysville R-I School District.
