= Marion Township, Doniphan County, Kansas =

Marion Township
- Township
- Location in Doniphan County
- Coordinates: 39°43′15″N 095°01′01″W
- Country: United States
- State: Kansas
- County: Doniphan

Area
  - Total: 18.01 sq mi (46.65 km^{2})
  - Land: 17.50 sq mi (45.32 km^{2})
  - Water: 0.51 sq mi (1.32 km^{2}) 2.83%
- Elevation: 1,053 ft (321 m)

Population (2020)
  - Total: 215
  - Density: 12.3/sq mi (4.74/km^{2})
- GNIS feature ID: 473034

Marion Township is a township in Doniphan County, Kansas, United States. As of the 2020 census, its population was 215.

== Geography ==
Marion Township covers an area of 18.01 square miles (46.6 km^{2}) and contains no incorporated settlements. According to the USGS, it contains one cemetery, Rosendale.

The streams of Brush Creek and Walnut Creek run through this township.
