= Doniphan, Kansas =

Unincorporated community in Doniphan County, Kansas

- Unincorporated community
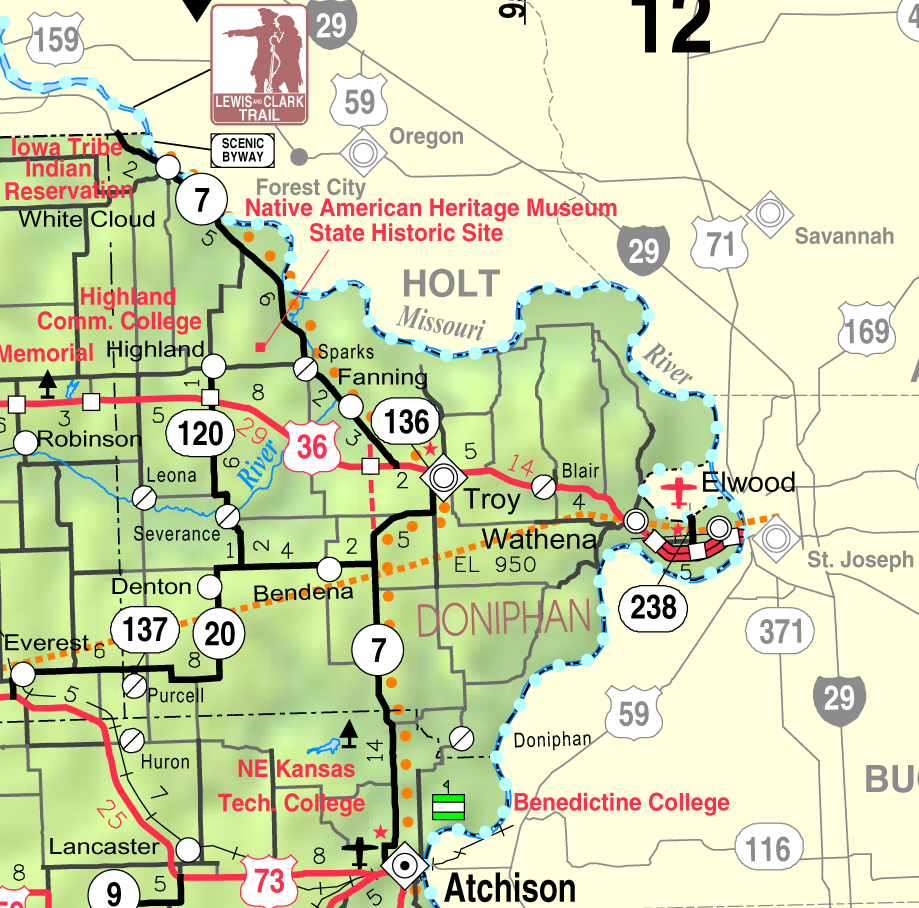
- KDOT map of Doniphan County (legend)

- Location within Kansas Location within the United States
- Coordinates: 39°38′30″N 95°4′51″W
- Country: United States
- State: Kansas
- County: Doniphan
- Founded: 1854; 172 years ago
- Platted: 1855
- Incorporated: 1869; 157 years ago
- Named for: Alexander Doniphan
- Elevation: 860 ft (260 m)
- Time zone: UTC-6 (CST)
  - Summer (DST): UTC-5 (CDT)
- Area code: 785
- FIPS code: 20-18275
- GNIS ID: 473282

Doniphan is an unincorporated community in Doniphan County, Kansas, United States.

== History ==
The company that founded the community was organized on November 11, 1854. Doniphan was incorporated in 1869. The community was named, as was the county, for Alexander William Doniphan, a military leader in the Mexican–American War.

A post office was opened in Doniphan on March 3, 1855, and remained in operation until it was discontinued on August 15, 1943.

== Demographics ==
Doniphan is part of the St. Joseph, MO–KS Metropolitan Statistical Area.
