= Wolf River (Kansas) =

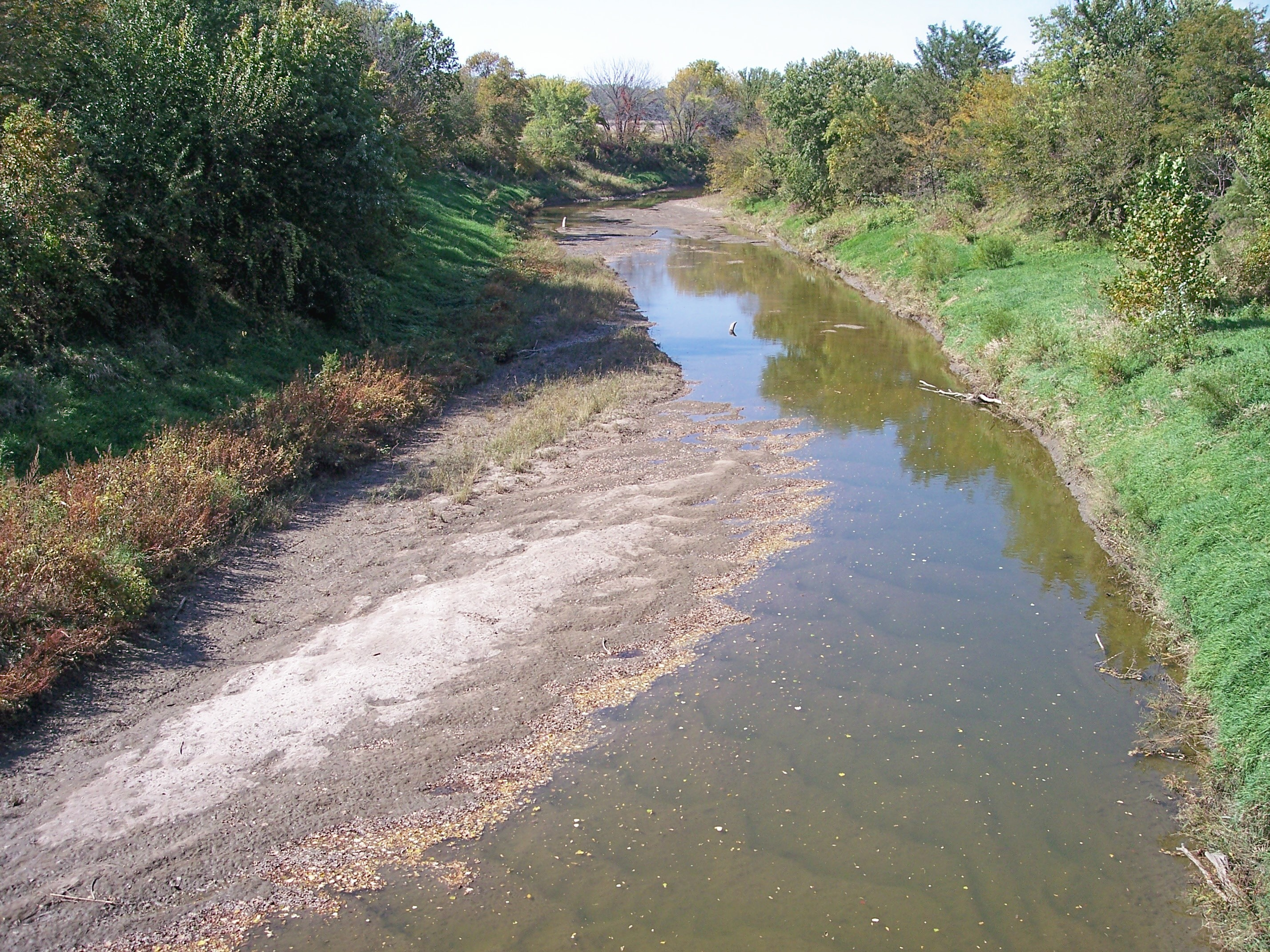
- The Wolf River near its mouth in 2006

Location
- Country: United States
- State: Kansas

Physical characteristics
- Source
  - location: north of Powhattan
  - coordinates: 39°47′38″N 95°38′28″W
  - elevation: 1,181 ft (360 m)
- Mouth: Missouri River
  - location: southeast of White Cloud
  - coordinates: 39°53′55″N 95°11′30″W
  - elevation: 827 ft (252 m)
- Basin size: 247.8 sq mi (642 km^{2})

The Wolf River is a 45.7-mile-long (73.5 km) tributary of the Missouri River in northeastern Kansas in the United States, draining an area of 247.8 square miles (642 km^{2}) in the Dissected Till Plains region.

It rises in Brown County, approximately 3 miles (4.8 km) north of Powhattan, and flows generally eastwardly into Doniphan County, past the communities of Robinson, Leona, and Severance. Near Severance, the river turns northward; it flows into the Missouri River approximately 8 miles (13 km) southeast of White Cloud.

According to a 2001 study by the Kansas Department of Health and Environment, 71% of the Wolf River watershed is cropland, 25% is grassland, 3% is woodland, and 0.5% is urban.

== Variant names ==
According to the Geographic Names Information System, the Wolf River has also been known historically as:

- Petite Riviere de Cansez
- Riviere du Loup
- Shun-ta-nesh-nanga
- Wolf Creek

== See also ==
- List of Kansas rivers
