= Moray, Kansas =

Unincorporated community in Doniphan County, Kansas

Coordinates: 39°45′45″N 95°10′18″W

Moray is an unincorporated community in Doniphan County, Kansas, United States.

== History ==
The first settlement at Moray was made in 1857. It was originally built up chiefly by Norwegians.

The first post office in Moray was established as East Norway in 1871. The post office, renamed Moray in 1894, closed temporarily in 1914, reopened in 1915, and closed permanently in 1938.
