= Doniphan County, Kansas =

County in Kansas, United States

- County
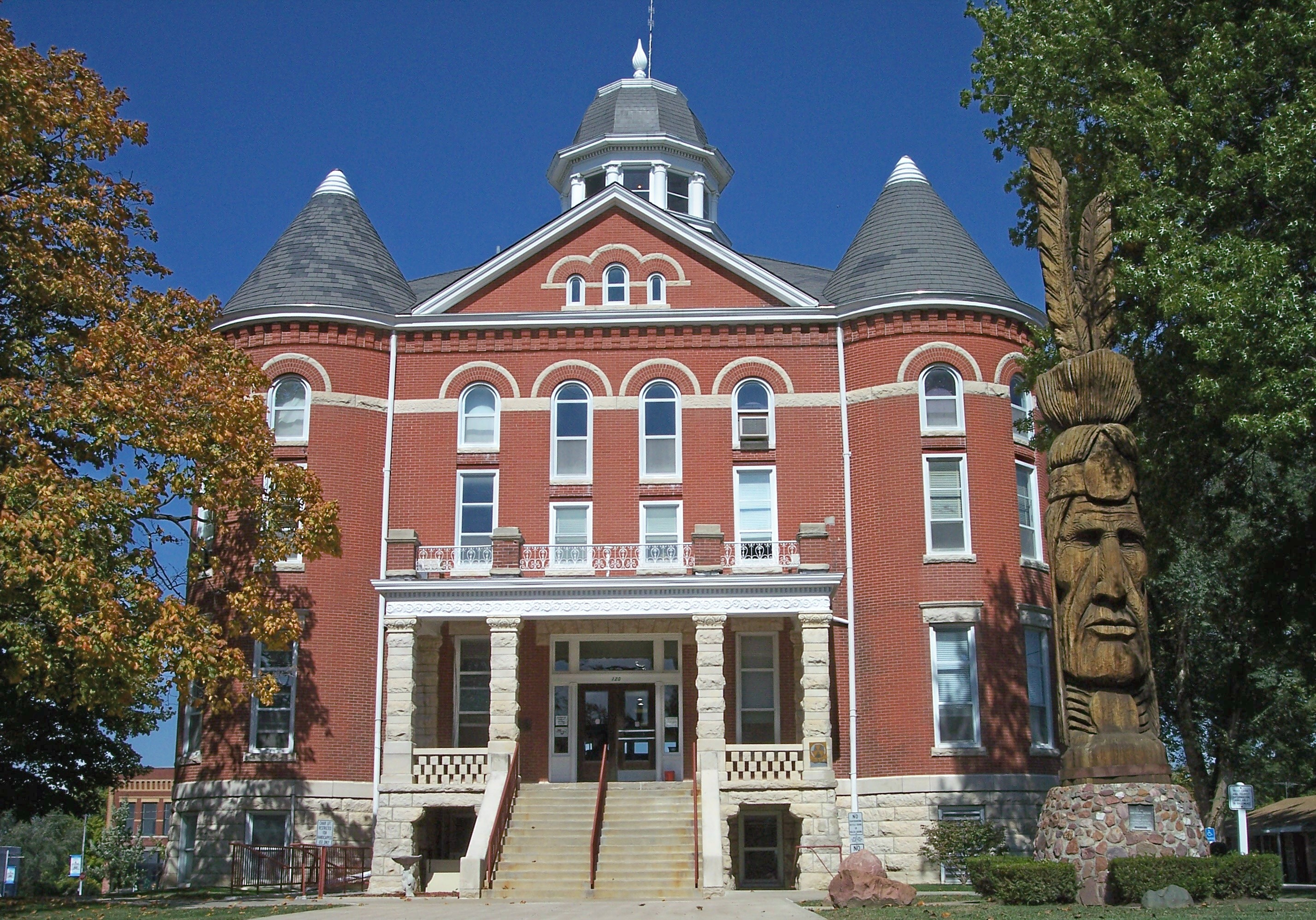
- Doniphan County Courthouse in Troy (2006)

- Location within the U.S. state of Kansas
- Coordinates: 39°48′N 95°07′W
- Country: United States
- State: Kansas
- Founded: August 25, 1855
- Named for: Alexander William Doniphan
- Seat: Troy
- Largest city: Wathena

Area
  - Total: 398 sq mi (1,030 km^{2})
  - Land: 393 sq mi (1,020 km^{2})
  - Water: 4.9 sq mi (13 km^{2}) 1.2%

Population (2020)
  - Total: 7,510
  - Estimate (2025): 7,594 ▲
  - Density: 19.1/sq mi (7.4/km^{2})
- Time zone: UTC−6 (Central)
  - Summer (DST): UTC−5 (CDT)
- Area code: 785
- Congressional district: 2nd
- Website: DpCountyKS.com

Doniphan County is the northeasternmost county in the U.S. state of Kansas. Its county seat is Troy, and its most populous city is Wathena. As of the 2020 census, the county population was 7,510. The county was named after Alexander Doniphan, a Mexican–American War hero. It is bounded on the east by the Missouri River, to the south by Atchison County and to the west by Brown County.

== History ==
=== Early history ===
For many millennia, the Great Plains of North America was inhabited by nomadic Native Americans. From the 16th century to 18th century, the Kingdom of France claimed ownership of large parts of North America. In 1762, after the French and Indian War, France secretly ceded New France to Spain, per the Treaty of Fontainebleau.

=== 19th century ===
In 1802, Spain returned most of the land to France, while keeping title to approximately 7,500 square miles. In 1803, most of the land for modern day Kansas was acquired by the United States from France as part of the 828,000 square mile Louisiana Purchase for 2.83 cents per acre.

In 1854, the Kansas Territory was organized, then in 1861 Kansas became the 34th U.S. state. Doniphan County was established on August 25, 1855, then organized on September 18, 1855. It is named for the U.S. cavalry commander Colonel Alexander W. Doniphan (1808–1887) of Liberty, Missouri, who played an important role in the Mexican–American War. He was a zealous partisan in the failed effort made to extend slavery into Kansas.

== Geography ==
Doniphan County is located in the northeastern corner of the state—it is bordered by Nebraska to the north and Missouri to the east. According to the U.S. Census Bureau, the county has a total area of 398 square miles (1,030 km^{2}), of which 393 square miles (1,020 km^{2}) is land and 4.9 square miles (13 km^{2}) (1.2%) is water. It is the third-smallest county in Kansas by land area and second-smallest by total area.

=== Geographic features ===
The Missouri River defines the border in the north and east. Eight barge lines travel the river, and a Port Authority is located across the river in Saint Joseph, Missouri. The river provides much of the water for the eastern part of the county. Interior cities, such as Troy and Highland, receive their water from underground wells. The Wolf River flows through western portions of the county and north into the Missouri River.

=== Major highways ===
The only major highway serving the county is U.S. Highway 36, an east–west route traveling through St. Joseph. Troy, Elwood, and Wathena lie along this route. Kansas state highways K-7, K-20, K-120, K-136, K-137, and K-238 serve other areas of the county. K-7 has been designated a scenic byway. (See the map below.)

=== Adjacent counties ===
- Holt County, Missouri (north)
- Andrew County, Missouri (northeast)
- Buchanan County, Missouri (southeast)
- Atchison County (southwest)
- Brown County (west)
- Richardson County, Nebraska (northwest)

== Demographics ==
Historical population
Census	Pop.	Note	%±
1860	8,083		—
1870	13,969		72.8%
1880	14,257		2.1%
1890	13,535		−5.1%
1900	15,079		11.4%
1910	14,422		−4.4%
1920	13,438		−6.8%
1930	14,063		4.7%
1940	12,936		−8.0%
1950	10,499		−18.8%
1960	9,574		−8.8%
1970	9,107		−4.9%
1980	9,268		1.8%
1990	8,134		−12.2%
2000	8,249		1.4%
2010	7,945		−3.7%
2020	7,510		−5.5%
2025 (est.)	7,594	▲	1.1%
U.S. Decennial Census; 1790-1960 1900-1990; 1990-2000 2010-2020

Doniphan County is part of the St. Joseph, MO-KS Metropolitan Statistical Area, which is also included in the Kansas City-Overland Park-Kansas City, MO-KS Combined Statistical Area.

=== Racial and ethnic composition ===
Doniphan County, Kansas – Racial and ethnic composition Note: the US Census treats Hispanic/Latino as an ethnic category. This table excludes Latinos from the racial categories and assigns them to a separate category. Hispanics/Latinos may be of any race.
Race / Ethnicity (NH = Non-Hispanic)	Pop 1980	Pop 1990	Pop 2000	Pop 2010	Pop 2020	% 1980	% 1990	% 2000	% 2010	% 2020
White alone (NH)	8,844	7,814	7,775	7,282	6,614	95.43%	96.07%	94.25%	91.66%	88.07%
Black or African American alone (NH)	249	155	164	242	266	2.69%	1.91%	1.99%	3.05%	3.54%
Native American or Alaska Native alone (NH)	91	96	98	78	66	0.98%	1.18%	1.19%	0.98%	0.88%
Asian alone (NH)	15	18	21	16	32	0.16%	0.22%	0.25%	0.20%	0.43%
Native Hawaiian or Pacific Islander alone (NH)	x	x	0	0	19	x	x	0.00%	0.00%	0.25%
Other race alone (NH)	4	3	3	4	28	0.04%	0.04%	0.04%	0.05%	0.37%
Mixed race or Multiracial (NH)	x	x	92	158	281	x	x	1.12%	1.99%	3.74%
Hispanic or Latino (any race)	65	48	96	165	204	0.70%	0.59%	1.16%	2.08%	2.72%
Total	9,268	8,134	8,249	7,945	7,510	100.00%	100.00%	100.00%	100.00%	100.00%

=== 2020 census ===
As of the 2020 census, the county had a population of 7,510. The median age was 40.3 years. 22.0% of residents were under the age of 18 and 19.6% of residents were 65 years of age or older. For every 100 females there were 102.8 males, and for every 100 females age 18 and over there were 103.2 males age 18 and over. 28.3% of residents lived in urban areas, while 71.7% lived in rural areas.

The racial makeup of the county was 89.2% White, 3.6% Black or African American, 1.1% American Indian and Alaska Native, 0.4% Asian, 0.3% Native Hawaiian and Pacific Islander, 0.9% from some other race, and 4.5% from two or more races. Hispanic or Latino residents of any race comprised 2.7% of the population.

There were 2,942 households in the county, of which 29.6% had children under the age of 18 living with them and 21.2% had a female householder with no spouse or partner present. About 27.6% of all households were made up of individuals and 12.6% had someone living alone who was 65 years of age or older.

There were 3,364 housing units, of which 12.5% were vacant. Among occupied housing units, 74.5% were owner-occupied and 25.5% were renter-occupied. The homeowner vacancy rate was 2.3% and the rental vacancy rate was 13.3%.

=== 2000 census ===
As of the 2000 census, there were 8,249 people, 3,173 households, and 2,183 families residing in the county. The population density was 21 people per square mile (8.1 people/km^{2}). There were 3,489 housing units at an average density of 9 per square mile (3.5/km^{2}). The racial makeup of the county was 94.85% White, 2.00% Black or African American, 1.21% Native American, 0.25% Asian, 0.40% from other races, and 1.29% from two or more races. Hispanic or Latino of any race were 1.16% of the population.

There were 3,173 households, out of which 32.60% had children under the age of 18 living with them, 56.40% were married couples living together, 8.70% had a female householder with no husband present, and 31.20% were non-families. 27.60% of all households were made up of individuals, and 14.20% had someone living alone who was 65 years of age or older. The average household size was 2.48 and the average family size was 3.03.

In the county, the population was spread out, with 25.30% under the age of 18, 11.80% from 18 to 24, 24.70% from 25 to 44, 22.00% from 45 to 64, and 16.20% who were 65 years of age or older. The median age was 37 years. For every 100 females, there were 98.60 males. For every 100 females age 18 and over, there were 96.20 males.

The median income for a household in the county was $32,537, and the median income for a family was $39,357. Males had a median income of $28,096 versus $19,721 for females. The per capita income for the county was $14,849. About 9.00% of families and 11.90% of the population were below the poverty line, including 13.30% of those under age 18 and 12.50% of those age 65 or over.

== Government ==
=== County ===
Doniphan County is served by a Board of County Commissioners, composed of one elected official from each of three districts. The commissioners serve four-year terms, with the second and third district elections at two-year intervals after the first district election. The board is responsible for setting the county's policies, procedures, and budgets as well as overseeing functions of their respective road and bridge shops. In addition, the board acts as the Board of County Canvassers and canvasses votes cast at each election. The county has adopted comprehensive county planning and zoning codes. The cities are governed by mayors and city councils. Government services are paid for through a sales tax, property tax, and an ad valorem tax mill levy.

=== Presidential elections ===
Presidential election results

United States presidential election results for Doniphan County, Kansas
Year	Republican		Democratic		Third party(ies)	
Year	No.	%	No.	%	No.	%
1888	2,245	66.52%	1,109	32.86%	21	0.62%
1892	2,161	64.41%	0	0.00%	1,194	35.59%
1896	2,549	65.38%	1,332	34.16%	18	0.46%
1900	2,464	65.92%	1,244	33.28%	30	0.80%
1904	2,361	75.02%	713	22.66%	73	2.32%
1908	2,307	66.29%	1,113	31.98%	60	1.72%
1912	1,321	39.14%	1,017	30.13%	1,037	30.73%
1916	2,826	58.05%	1,916	39.36%	126	2.59%
1920	3,369	76.46%	978	22.20%	59	1.34%
1924	3,789	72.78%	1,072	20.59%	345	6.63%
1928	4,002	72.64%	1,496	27.16%	11	0.20%
1932	2,748	51.37%	2,532	47.34%	69	1.29%
1936	3,791	57.80%	2,749	41.91%	19	0.29%
1940	4,204	67.70%	1,986	31.98%	20	0.32%
1944	3,230	71.92%	1,261	28.08%	0	0.00%
1948	2,785	63.74%	1,555	35.59%	29	0.66%
1952	3,711	75.70%	1,175	23.97%	16	0.33%
1956	3,130	72.14%	1,197	27.59%	12	0.28%
1960	2,882	67.38%	1,383	32.34%	12	0.28%
1964	1,952	51.05%	1,856	48.54%	16	0.42%
1968	2,402	63.31%	958	25.25%	434	11.44%
1972	2,856	78.40%	690	18.94%	97	2.66%
1976	2,469	62.21%	1,428	35.98%	72	1.81%
1980	2,523	67.84%	1,001	26.92%	195	5.24%
1984	2,818	73.77%	962	25.18%	40	1.05%
1988	2,162	61.53%	1,312	37.34%	40	1.14%
1992	1,579	39.74%	1,177	29.62%	1,217	30.63%
1996	1,962	64.24%	1,050	34.38%	42	1.38%
2000	2,350	64.40%	1,134	31.08%	165	4.52%
2004	2,491	69.14%	1,065	29.56%	47	1.30%
2008	2,372	66.55%	1,115	31.29%	77	2.16%
2012	2,414	70.94%	902	26.51%	87	2.56%
2016	2,606	77.15%	587	17.38%	185	5.48%
2020	2,976	80.24%	686	18.50%	47	1.27%
2024	2,899	81.05%	626	17.50%	52	1.45%

Owing to its history of settlement by anti-slavery Yankees from Iowa and ultimately New England, Doniphan County became a Republican stronghold and has remained so ever since. The county has voted for the Republican nominee in every presidential election since Kansas became a state, beginning in 1864. With Riley County voting Democratic for the first time in the 2020 election, Doniphan County is the only county in Kansas that has never had at least a plurality for the Democratic nominee. Doniphan County is one of six counties or county equivalents that have voted Republican for president in every election since they came into existence. (Note: Along with Leslie County, Kentucky (since 1880); Colonial Heights, Virginia (since 1952); Poquoson, Virginia (since 1976); Chugach Census Area, Alaska (since 2020); and Copper River Census Area, Alaska (since 2020).)

Only on three occasions has the Democratic nominee reached forty percent of Doniphan County's vote, all of these in national landslides, and on only seven occasions have the Democrats managed 35 percent of the vote in the county.

=== Laws ===
Although the Kansas Constitution was amended in 1986 to allow the sale of alcoholic liquor by the individual drink with the approval of voters, Doniphan County remained a prohibition, or "dry", county until 2012.

== Education ==
=== Unified school districts ===
- Doniphan West USD 111
- Riverside USD 114
- Troy USD 429

=== Colleges and universities ===
Highland Community College was the first college established in the state when the Highland University charter was granted by the Territorial Legislature in 1858. Over time the college lost its affiliation with the Presbyterian Church and changed its name several times before becoming a regional rural community college. (Web site)

== Communities ==
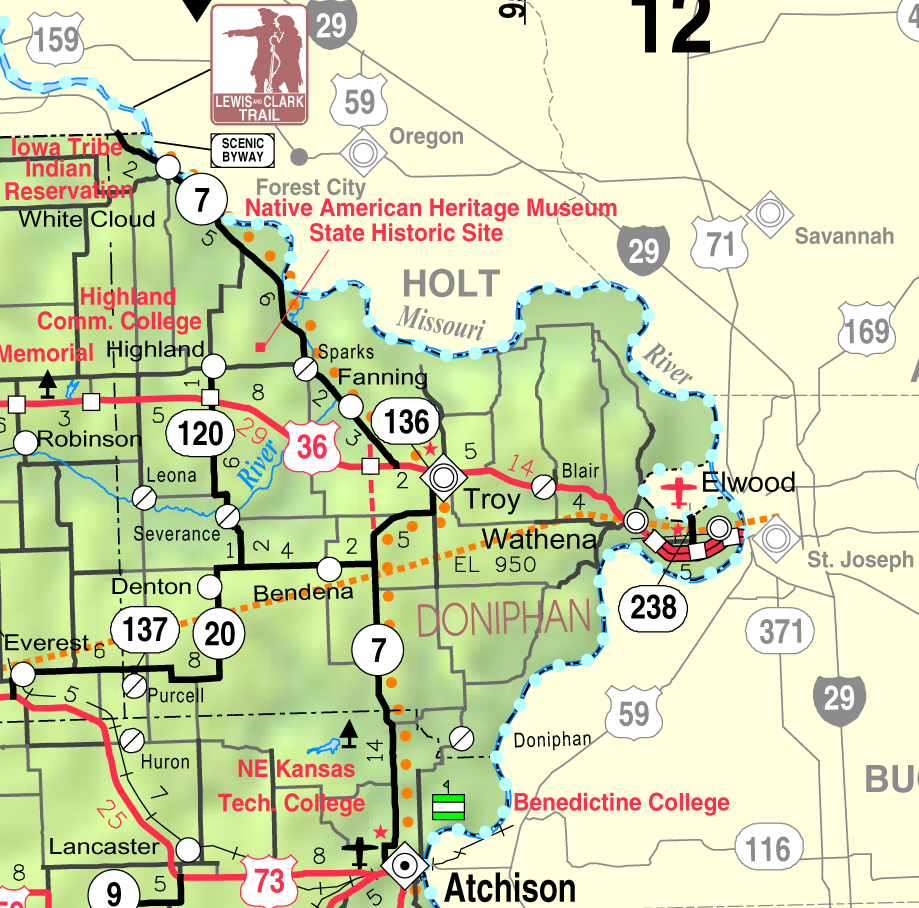
2005 map of Doniphan County (map legend)

List of townships / incorporated cities / unincorporated communities / extinct former communities within Doniphan County.

=== Cities ===
- Denton
- Elwood
- Highland
- Leona
- Severance
- Troy (county seat)
- Wathena
- White Cloud

=== Unincorporated communities ===
† means a community is designated a Census-Designated Place (CDP) by the United States Census Bureau.

- Bendena†
- Blair
- Brenner
- Doniphan
- Fanning
- Iowa Point
- Moray
- Palermo
- Purcell
- Sparks

=== Ghost town ===
- Geary

=== Indian reservation ===
‡ means a community has portions in an adjacent county.

- Ioway Reservation‡

=== Townships ===
Doniphan County is divided into nine mostly rural townships. The three townships with the greatest population lie along U.S. Highway 36. None of the cities within the county are considered governmentally independent, and all figures for the township include those of the cities. In the following table, the population center is the largest city (or cities) included in that township's population total, if it is of a significant size.

Township	FIPS	Population center	Population	Population density /km^{2} (/sq mi)	Land area km^{2} (sq mi)	Water area km^{2} (sq mi)	Water %	Geographic coordinates
Burr Oak	09500		153	2 (5)	81 (31)	2 (1)	2.73%	39°51′17″N 94°58′19″W
Center	11700	Troy	1,743	11 (28)	162 (63)	2 (1)	1.31%	39°47′35″N 95°5′30″W
Independence	33850		342	4 (9)	96 (37)	0 (0)	0.01%	39°42′13″N 95°11′8″W
Iowa	34400	Highland	1,694	8 (20)	216 (83)	2 (1)	1.05%	39°53′12″N 95°15′3″W
Marion	44675		226	5 (13)	45 (17)	1 (1)	2.84%	39°43′29″N 94°59′43″W
Union	72125		360	4 (10)	94 (36)	0 (0)	0.09%	39°42′14″N 95°16′27″W
Washington	75600	Wathena, Elwood	3,066	36 (94)	85 (33)	4 (1)	4.30%	39°45′39″N 94°55′38″W
Wayne	76100		226	2 (6)	92 (36)	1 (0)	0.73%	39°40′56″N 95°4′57″W
Wolf River	80275		439	3 (8)	145 (56)	0 (0)	0.02%	39°46′54″N 95°14′26″W
Sources: "Census 2000 U.S. Gazetteer Files". U.S. Census Bureau, Geography Division. Archived from the original on August 2, 2002.

== Points of interest ==
- Native American Heritage Museum, 2 miles east of Highland : Originally a Presbyterian Mission built in 1845 to educate Iowa and Missouri Sac and Fox children, the museum was rehabilitated to showcase the arts and history of the emigrant tribes in northeastern Kansas. (Web site)
- Nelson Rodgers House, in Troy : Built in 1856, this 1 1/2-story center-gable house constructed of hand-hewn timbers is the first and oldest remaining house in Troy.
- Four-state Lookout, in White Cloud : This viewing platform provides a panoramic view of the Missouri River valley, including Kansas, Missouri, Nebraska, and (possibly) Iowa.
- Townsite of Old Doniphan : On July 4, 1804, the Lewis and Clark Expedition camped near an uninhabited Kanza Indian village on Independence Creek. The former town of Doniphan was established in the vicinity of the campsite.

== See also ==
- Dry counties
- National Register of Historic Places listings in Doniphan County, Kansas

Community information for Kansas

- Kansas locations by per capita income
- List of counties in Kansas
- List of townships in Kansas
- List of cities in Kansas
- List of unincorporated communities in Kansas
- List of ghost towns in Kansas
