= Brenner, Kansas =

Unincorporated community in Doniphan County, Kansas

Coordinates: 39°43′31″N 95°06′55″W

Brenner is an unincorporated community in Wayne Township, Doniphan County, Kansas, United States.

== History ==
Brenner was established in 1872 when the Atchison & Nebraska Railroad was extended to that point.

The first post office at Brenner opened in 1871, closed temporarily in April, 1912, reopened in June, 1912, and reclosed permanently in 1917.
