= Wolf River Township, Kansas =

Wolf River Township
- Township
- Location in Doniphan County
- Coordinates: 39°47′35″N 095°12′31″W
- Country: United States
- State: Kansas
- County: Doniphan

Area
  - Total: 55.97 sq mi (144.96 km^{2})
  - Land: 55.96 sq mi (144.93 km^{2})
  - Water: 0.015 sq mi (0.04 km^{2}) 0.03%
- Elevation: 958 ft (292 m)

Population (2020)
  - Total: 350
  - Density: 6.3/sq mi (2.4/km^{2})
- GNIS feature ID: 0473003

Wolf River Township is a township in Doniphan County, Kansas, United States. As of the 2020 census, its population was 350.

== History ==
Wolf River Township was organized in 1855.

== Geography ==
Wolf River Township covers an area of 55.97 square miles (145.0 km^{2}) and contains two incorporated settlements: Leona and Severance. According to the USGS, it contains four cemeteries: Bitner, Burl, Oak Hill and Wolf River.

The streams of Charlie Creek, Cold Ryan Branch, Halling Creek, Kenney Creek, Nelson Creek, Rittenhouse Branch, Springs Branch and Squaw Creek run through this township.

== Transportation ==
Wolf River Township contains one airport or landing strip, Rush Airport.
