= Doniphan West USD 111 =

Public school district in Denton, Kansas

Address
- 624 Hwy 20 East Denton, Kansas, 66017; United States
- Coordinates: 39.7307°N 95.2649°W

District information
- Type: Public
- Grades: K to 12
- Schools: 2
- NCES District ID: 2000348

Students and staff
- Students: 313
- Teachers: 29.5
- Staff: 40.0
- Student–teacher ratio: 10.61

Other information
- Website: usd111.org

Doniphan West USD 111 is a public unified school district headquartered in Denton, Kansas, United States. The district includes the communities of Denton, Bendena, Highland, Leona, Severance, White Cloud, and nearby rural areas of Doniphan County.

== Schools ==
The school district operates the following schools:

- Doniphan West Junior-Senior High School.
- Doniphan West Elementary School.

== History ==
In 2009, Midway-Denton USD 433 consolidated with Highland USD 425 to form Doniphan West USD 111.

The Midway-Denton USD 433 school colors were Red, White and Blue and the mascot was the Eagle.

The Highland USD 425 colors were blue and white, and their mascot was the Bluestreaks.

Midway and Highland were sports rivals before the consolidation.

Previously the middle school was near Denton and the high school was in Highland.

== See also ==
- Kansas State Department of Education
- Kansas State High School Activities Association
- List of high schools in Kansas
- List of unified school districts in Kansas
