= Chloe Gartner =

American novelist

Chloe Maria Gartner Trimble (21 March 1916 – 6 August 2003) was an American historical novelist who wrote under the name Chloe Gartner.

Born Chloe Maria Gartner in Troy, Kansas, where she spent her early childhood, Gartner was also raised in Texas, in El Monte, California, and in Lincoln, Nebraska, then as a young adult resided with her mother and stepfather in Grand Junction, Colorado, where she attended Mesa College. Relocating to the Bay Area originally to study at UC Berkeley, Gartner subsequently took writing courses at the College of Marin prior to a long-time tenure at the San Francisco Chronicle and was for a time married to Chronicle reporter Peter Trimble whom she met through her original Chronicle position of librarian, while Trimble was working his original Chronicle position of copy boy: the couple, who lived in San Francisco, became the parents of a daughter: Kristine Gartner Trimble Cameron, in 1947. From 1956 to 1961 Gartner worked as assistant to Chronicle columnist Stanton Delaplane: by this time she was divorced and living with her daughter in Kentfield, California.

In 1937, while residing in Grand Junction, Gartner had a play entitled Obscure Destination published, and in 1938 she had published a one-act play: Perchance to Dream (published by Samuel French), and also the first two of her few evident short stories: "Giuseppe Goes Home" and "Prelude to Exile" which appeared in respectively the University of Nebraska quarterly journal Prairie Schooner and the Montana State University quarterly journal Frontier and Midland. However Gartner evidently only began to write in earnest in the mid-1950s when a sudden interest in the First Crusade resulted in the 1960 publication of Gartner's first novel: The Infidels, written over two years subsequent to a three-year period of research. Gartner subsequently had several novels with historical backgrounds published, as listed below:

- The Infidels (1960)
- Drums of Khartoum (1967)
- The Woman from the Glen (1973)
- Mistress of the Highlands
  aka Highland Mistress (1976)
- Anne Bonny (1977)
- Daughter of the Desert (1978)
- The Image & the Dream (1980)
- Still Falls the Rain (1986)
- Greenleaf (1987)
- Lower than the Angels (1989)

In her later years Gartner resided with her daughter's family in Templeton, California.
