= Center Township, Doniphan County, Kansas =

Center Township
- Township
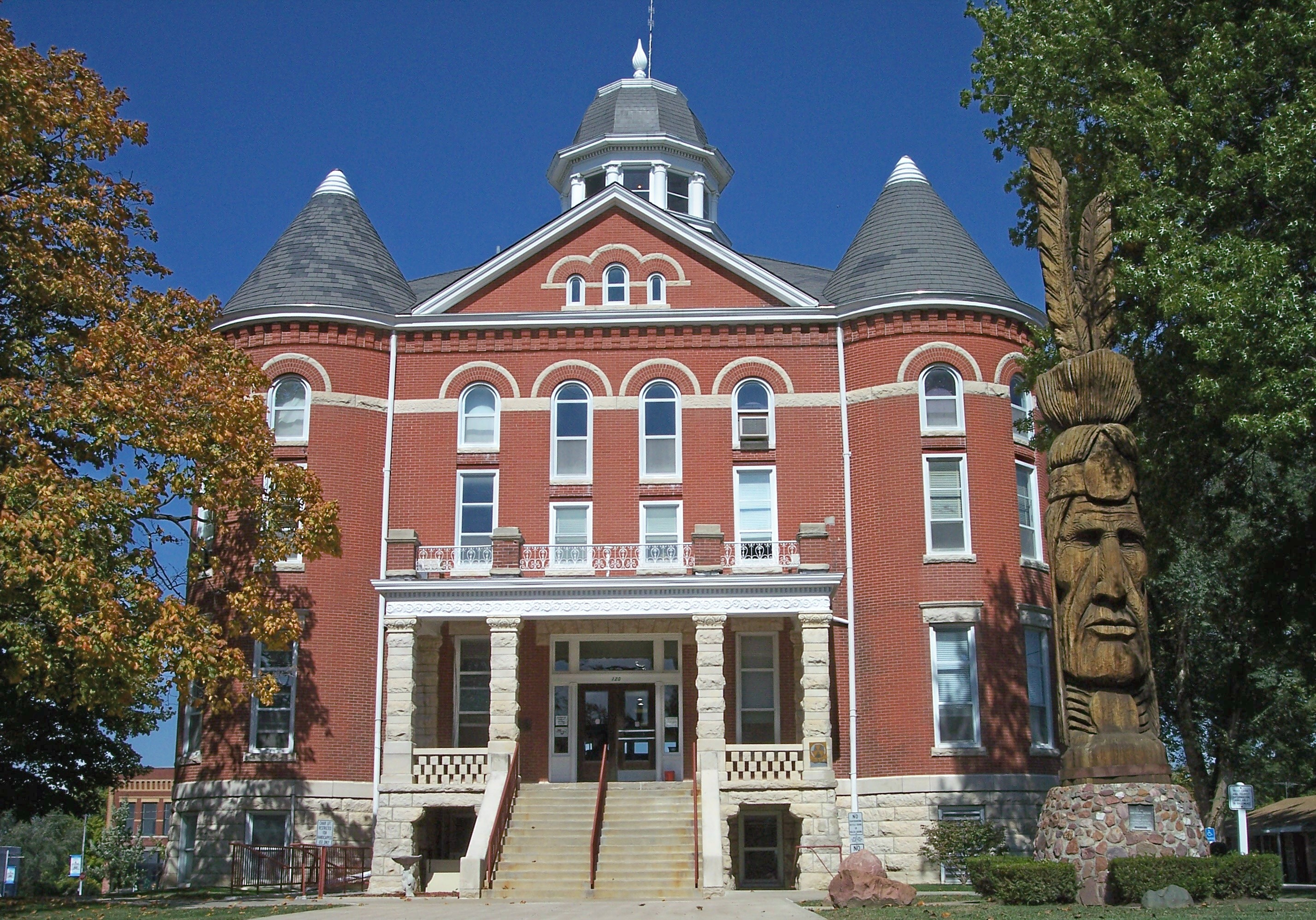
- Doniphan County Courthouse in Troy

- Location in Doniphan County
- Coordinates: 39°47′45″N 095°05′01″W
- Country: United States
- State: Kansas
- County: Doniphan

Area
  - Total: 63.37 sq mi (164.12 km^{2})
  - Land: 62.54 sq mi (161.97 km^{2})
  - Water: 0.83 sq mi (2.16 km^{2}) 1.32%
- Elevation: 1,150 ft (350 m)

Population (2020)
  - Total: 1,663
  - Density: 26.59/sq mi (10.27/km^{2})
- GNIS feature ID: 0472813

Center Township is a township in Doniphan County, Kansas, United States. As of the 2020 census, its population was 1,663.

== History ==
Center Township (spelled historically Centre) was organized in 1856.

== Geography ==
Center Township covers an area of 63.37 square miles (164.1 km^{2}) and contains one incorporated settlement, Troy (the county seat). According to the USGS, it contains four cemeteries: Charleston, Courter-Ritchey, Mount Olive and Saint Charles.

The stream of Mosquito Creek runs through this township.

== Transportation ==
Center Township contains two airports or landing strips: Masters Field and Troy Airport.
