= Sparks, Kansas =

Unincorporated community in Doniphan County, Kansas

- Unincorporated community
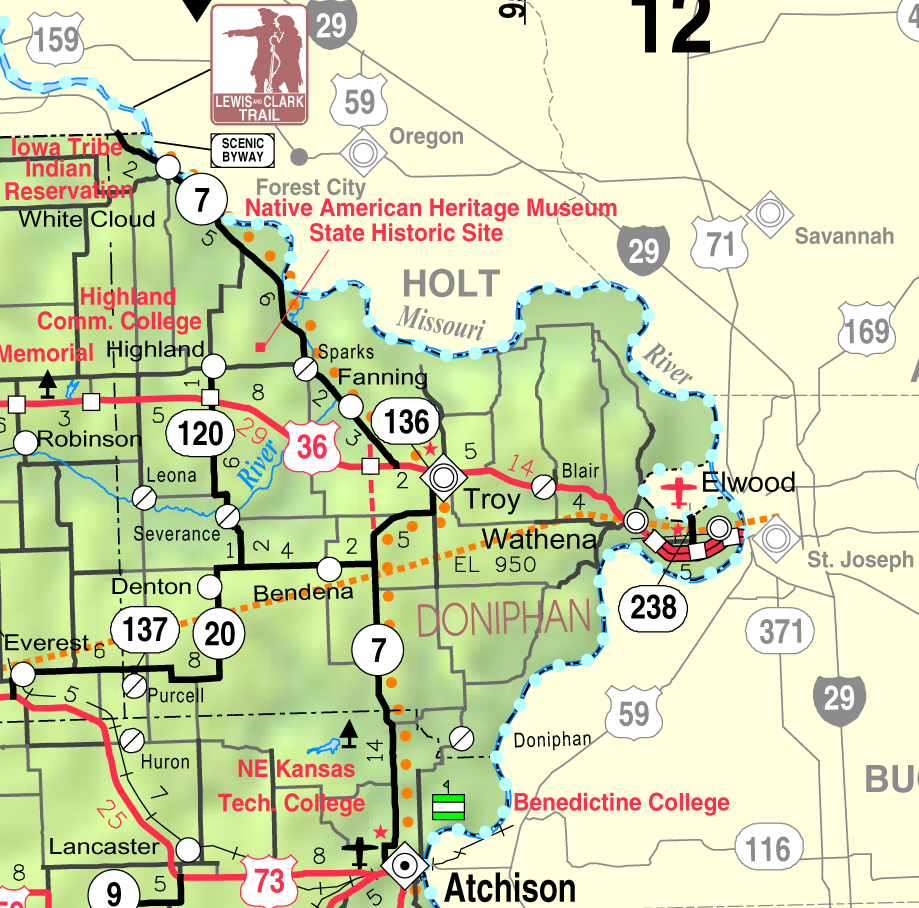
- KDOT map of Doniphan County (legend)

- Location within Kansas Location within the United States
- Coordinates: 39°51′27″N 95°11′25″W
- Country: United States
- State: Kansas
- County: Doniphan
- Elevation: 863 ft (263 m)
- Time zone: UTC-6 (CST)
  - Summer (DST): UTC-5 (CDT)
- Area code: 785
- FIPS code: 20-67100
- GNIS ID: 473031

Sparks is an unincorporated community in Doniphan County, Kansas, United States. Sparks is located along K-7, 4.2 miles (6.8 km) east of Highland.

== History ==
A post office was opened in Highland Station in 1871, and remained in operation until it was discontinued in 1971. The post office was officially Highland Station until October 1908. J. A. Kennedy served as postmaster.

Sparks had a schoolhouse, hotel, general store, blacksmith, bank, and union church used by various denominations.
