= Palermo, Kansas =

Unincorporated community in Doniphan County, Kansas

Coordinates: 39°43′57″N 94°58′36″W

Palermo is an unincorporated community in Doniphan County, Kansas, United States.

== History ==
A post office was opened in Palermo in 1855, and remained in operation until it was discontinued in 1904.
