= Independence Township, Doniphan County, Kansas =

- Township
- Location in Doniphan County
- Coordinates: 39°41′55″N 095°10′01″W
- Country: United States
- State: Kansas
- County: Doniphan

Area
  - Total: 37.0 sq mi (95.8 km^{2})
  - Land: 36.98 sq mi (95.79 km^{2})
  - Water: 0.0039 sq mi (0.01 km^{2}) 0.01%
- Elevation: 1,020 ft (311 m)

Population (2020)
  - Total: 257
  - Density: 7.0/sq mi (2.7/km^{2})
- GNIS feature ID: 473013

Independence Township is a township in Doniphan County, Kansas, United States. As of the 2020 census, its population was 257.

== Geography ==
Independence Township covers an area of 36.99 square miles (95.8 km^{2}) and contains no incorporated settlements.

The streams of Jordan Creek and North Branch Independence Creek run through this township.

== Demographics ==
As of the 2020 census, there were 257 people living in the township. The population density was 6.9 inhabitants per square mile (2.7/km^{2}). There were 129 housing units. The racial makeup of the township was 95.3% White alone, 0.4% Some Other Race alone, and 4.3% two or more races.

== See also ==
- List of townships in Kansas
