= Elwood, Kansas =

City in Doniphan County, Kansas

- City
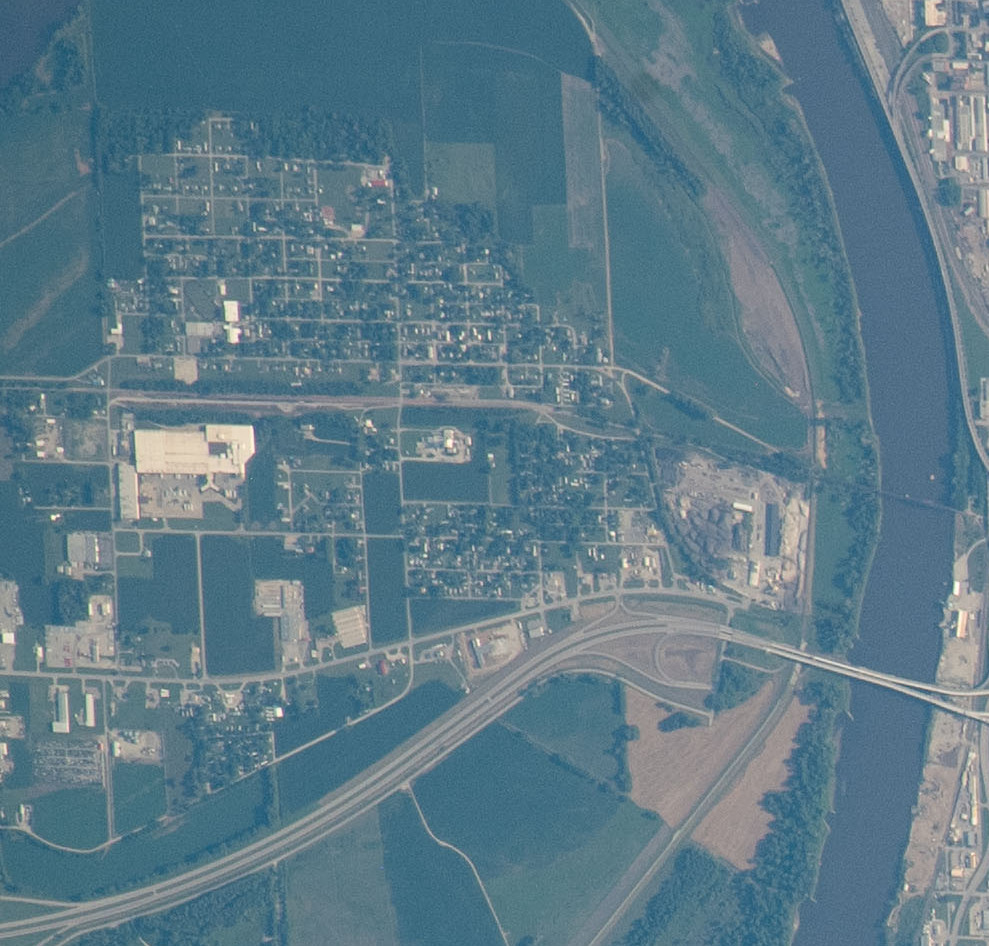
- Elwood on July 4, 2022, taken from the International Space Station

- Location within Doniphan County and Kansas

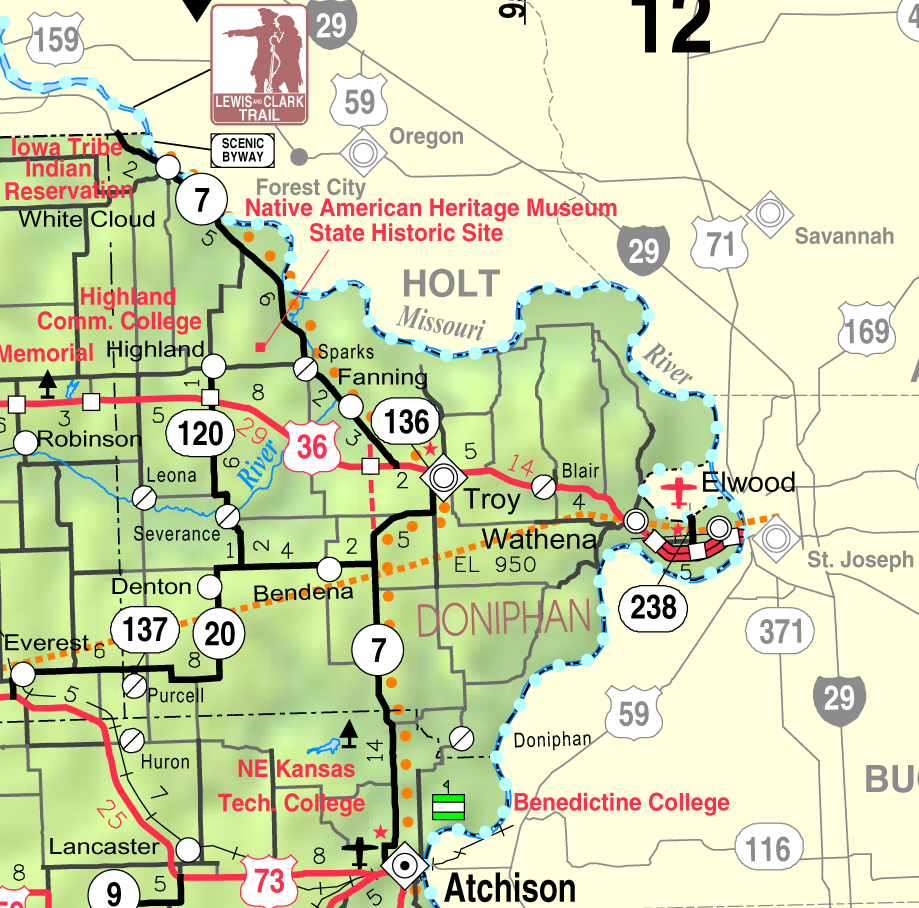
- KDOT map of Doniphan County (legend)
- Coordinates: 39°45′13″N 94°52′42″W
- Country: United States
- State: Kansas
- County: Doniphan
- Founded: 1856
- Incorporated: 1860
- Named for: John Elwood

Area
  - Total: 2.91 sq mi (7.54 km^{2})
  - Land: 2.91 sq mi (7.54 km^{2})
  - Water: 0 sq mi (0.00 km^{2})
- Elevation: 817 ft (249 m)

Population (2020)
  - Total: 1,125
  - Density: 386/sq mi (149/km^{2})
- Time zone: UTC-6 (CST)
  - Summer (DST): UTC-5 (CDT)
- ZIP Code: 66024
- Area code: 913
- FIPS code: 20-20950
- GNIS ID: 2394681
- Website: City website

Elwood is a city in Doniphan County, Kansas, United States, located west across the Missouri River from Saint Joseph, Missouri. As of the 2020 census, the population of the city was 1,125.

== History ==
For millennia the Great Plains of North America were inhabited by nomadic Native Americans. In 1854, the Kansas Territory was organized under the provisions of the Kansas–Nebraska Act, then in 1861 Kansas became the 34th U.S. state. In 1855, Doniphan County was established.

A trading post was established at Elwood in 1852. In 1856, the site was sold and the town was then laid out. The town was named for John B. Elwood, a pioneer settler. Elwood was incorporated as a city in 1860.

The first post office in Elwood was established in June, 1857.

== Geography ==
According to the United States Census Bureau, the city has a total area of 3.20 square miles (8.29 km^{2}), all land.

=== Climate ===
Climate data for Elwood, Kansas (Rosecrans Memorial Airport, Missouri) 1991–2020 normals, extremes 1908–present
Month	Jan	Feb	Mar	Apr	May	Jun	Jul	Aug	Sep	Oct	Nov	Dec	Year
Record high °F (°C)	73 (23)	83 (28)	98 (37)	96 (36)	103 (39)	105 (41)	108 (42)	110 (43)	107 (42)	97 (36)	82 (28)	73 (23)	110 (43)
Mean maximum °F (°C)	62 (17)	65 (18)	79 (26)	87 (31)	92 (33)	95 (35)	97 (36)	97 (36)	92 (33)	88 (31)	75 (24)	64 (18)	99 (37)
Mean daily maximum °F (°C)	37.4 (3.0)	42.8 (6.0)	55.1 (12.8)	65.9 (18.8)	75.8 (24.3)	84.7 (29.3)	88.1 (31.2)	86.2 (30.1)	79.7 (26.5)	67.8 (19.9)	53.4 (11.9)	41.1 (5.1)	64.8 (18.2)
Daily mean °F (°C)	27.3 (−2.6)	32.0 (0.0)	43.3 (6.3)	53.8 (12.1)	64.8 (18.2)	74.2 (23.4)	77.7 (25.4)	75.3 (24.1)	67.0 (19.4)	55.3 (12.9)	42.0 (5.6)	31.1 (−0.5)	53.6 (12.0)
Mean daily minimum °F (°C)	17.1 (−8.3)	21.2 (−6.0)	31.5 (−0.3)	41.8 (5.4)	53.7 (12.1)	63.8 (17.7)	67.3 (19.6)	64.5 (18.1)	54.4 (12.4)	42.8 (6.0)	30.6 (−0.8)	21.1 (−6.1)	42.5 (5.8)
Mean minimum °F (°C)	−5 (−21)	3 (−16)	12 (−11)	25 (−4)	38 (3)	51 (11)	56 (13)	52 (11)	39 (4)	25 (−4)	14 (−10)	1 (−17)	−9 (−23)
Record low °F (°C)	−25 (−32)	−23 (−31)	−13 (−25)	2 (−17)	29 (−2)	41 (5)	41 (5)	41 (5)	30 (−1)	11 (−12)	−5 (−21)	−24 (−31)	−25 (−32)
Average precipitation inches (mm)	0.71 (18)	0.95 (24)	2.06 (52)	3.71 (94)	4.87 (124)	4.75 (121)	4.73 (120)	3.84 (98)	3.18 (81)	2.84 (72)	1.87 (47)	1.25 (32)	34.76 (883)
Average precipitation days (≥ 0.01 in)	4.7	5.6	7.7	10.6	12.3	11.8	9.3	9.4	8.4	8.3	5.6	5.6	99.3
Source: NOAA

== Demographics ==
Historical population
Census	Pop.	Note	%±
1880	323		—
1890	377		16.7%
1900	623		65.3%
1910	636		2.1%
1920	750		17.9%
1930	849		13.2%
1940	1,014		19.4%
1950	1,020		0.6%
1960	1,191		16.8%
1970	1,283		7.7%
1980	1,275		−0.6%
1990	1,079		−15.4%
2000	1,145		6.1%
2010	1,224		6.9%
2020	1,125		−8.1%
U.S. Decennial Census

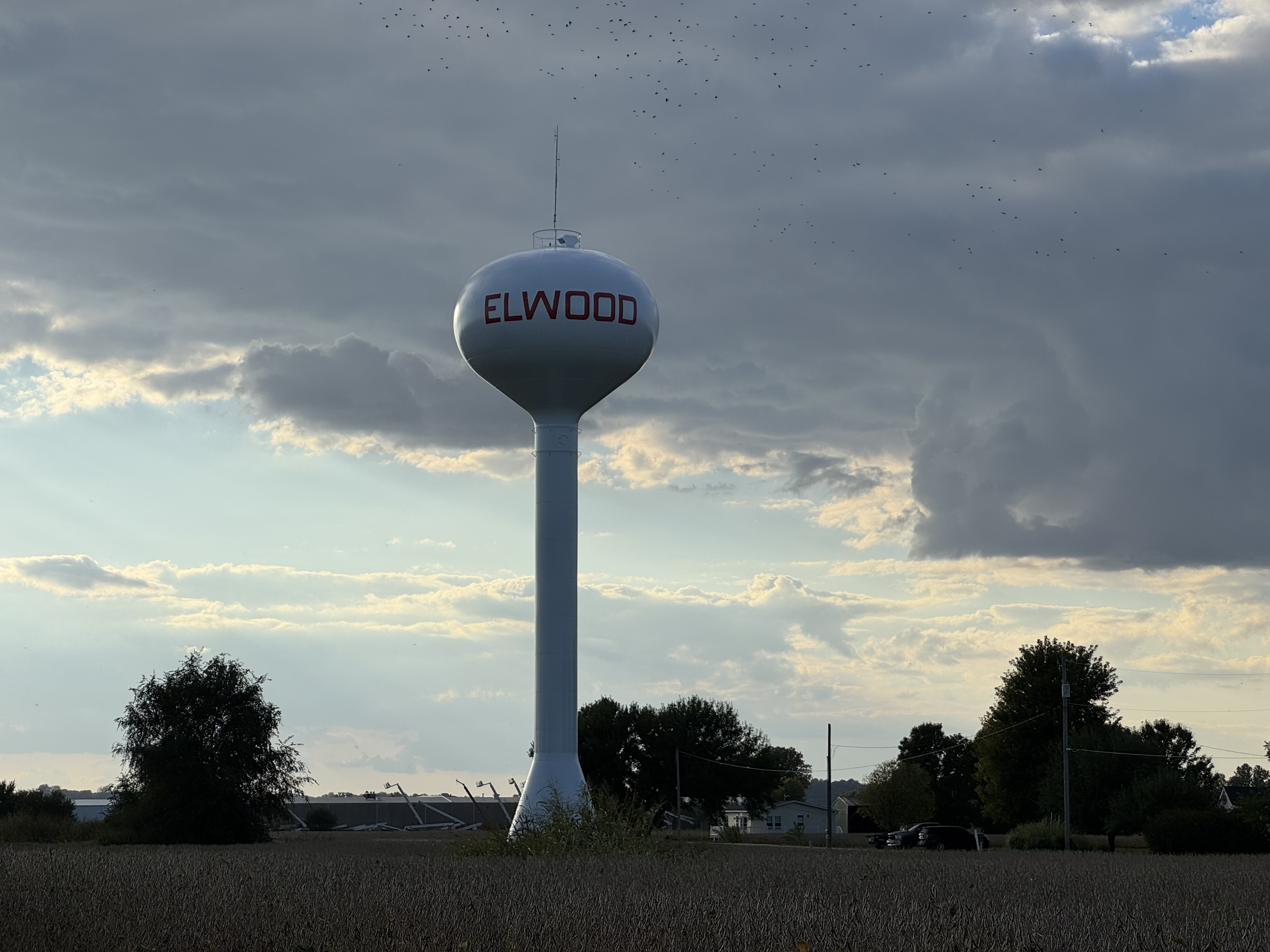
Water tower in Elwood (2025)

Elwood is part of the St. Joseph, MO–KS Metropolitan Statistical Area.

=== 2020 census ===
The 2020 United States census counted 1,125 people, 441 households, and 282 families in Elwood. The population density was 386.6 per square mile (149.3/km^{2}). There were 494 housing units at an average density of 169.8 per square mile (65.5/km^{2}). The racial makeup was 82.67% (930) white or European American (81.33% non-Hispanic white), 7.47% (84) black or African-American, 1.07% (12) Native American or Alaska Native, 0.27% (3) Asian, 0.18% (2) Pacific Islander or Native Hawaiian, 1.07% (12) from other races, and 7.29% (82) from two or more races. Hispanic or Latino of any race was 3.73% (42) of the population.

Of the 441 households, 32.0% had children under the age of 18; 44.2% were married couples living together; 26.5% had a female householder with no spouse or partner present. 29.0% of households consisted of individuals and 13.2% had someone living alone who was 65 years of age or older. The average household size was 2.4 and the average family size was 2.8. The percent of those with a bachelor's degree or higher was estimated to be 1.2% of the population.

25.8% of the population was under the age of 18, 9.1% from 18 to 24, 25.9% from 25 to 44, 25.0% from 45 to 64, and 14.3% who were 65 years of age or older. The median age was 36.1 years. For every 100 females, there were 104.9 males. For every 100 females ages 18 and older, there were 104.7 males.

The 2016–2020 5-year American Community Survey estimates show that the median household income was $38,015 (with a margin of error of +/- $7,551) and the median family income was $46,667 (+/- $16,039). Males had a median income of $36,250 (+/- $11,550) versus $22,778 (+/- $2,716) for females. The median income for those above 16 years old was $26,616 (+/- $4,457). Approximately, 25.4% of families and 19.8% of the population were below the poverty line, including 30.5% of those under the age of 18 and 4.7% of those ages 65 or over.

=== 2010 census ===
As of the census of 2010, there were 1,224 people, 498 households, and 331 families living in the city. The population density was 382.5 inhabitants per square mile (147.7/km^{2}). There were 533 housing units at an average density of 166.6 per square mile (64.3/km^{2}). The racial makeup of the city was 87.1% White, 6.7% African American, 0.9% Native American, 0.2% Asian, 1.0% from other races, and 4.2% from two or more races. Hispanic or Latino of any race were 4.4% of the population.

There were 498 households, of which 32.3% had children under the age of 18 living with them, 46.4% were married couples living together, 15.1% had a female householder with no husband present, 5.0% had a male householder with no wife present, and 33.5% were non-families. 28.9% of all households were made up of individuals, and 10% had someone living alone who was 65 years of age or older. The average household size was 2.46 and the average family size was 3.00.

The median age in the city was 36.7 years. 25.1% of residents were under the age of 18; 10.3% were between the ages of 18 and 24; 24.6% were from 25 to 44; 27.2% were from 45 to 64; and 12.9% were 65 years of age or older. The gender makeup of the city was 50.1% male and 49.9% female.

== Education ==
The community is served by Riverside USD 114 public school district. School unification consolidated Elwood schools and Wathena schools forming USD 114. The Riverside High School mascot is Cyclones.

Elwood High School closed through school unification. The Elwood High School mascot was Elwood Panthers.
