= Leona, Kansas =

City in Doniphan County, Kansas

- City
- Location within Doniphan County and Kansas

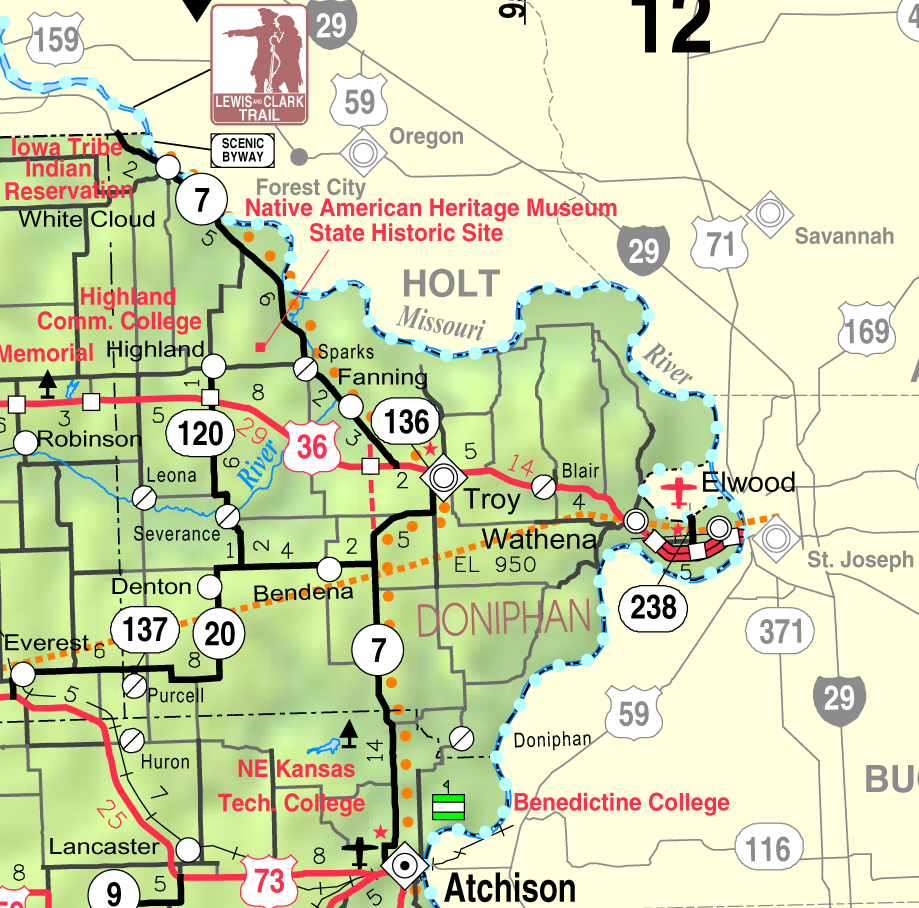
- KDOT map of Doniphan County (legend)
- Coordinates: 39°47′10″N 95°19′17″W
- Country: United States
- State: Kansas
- County: Doniphan
- Founded: 1873
- Platted: 1873
- Incorporated: 1934
- Named for: Leona Shock

Area
  - Total: 0.062 sq mi (0.16 km^{2})
  - Land: 0.062 sq mi (0.16 km^{2})
  - Water: 0 sq mi (0.00 km^{2})
- Elevation: 942 ft (287 m)

Population (2020)
  - Total: 41
  - Density: 660/sq mi (260/km^{2})
- Time zone: UTC-6 (CST)
  - Summer (DST): UTC-5 (CDT)
- FIPS code: 20-39475
- GNIS ID: 2395680
- Website: City website

Leona is a city in Doniphan County, Kansas, United States. As of the 2020 census, the population of the city was 41.

== History ==
Leona was laid out in 1873. The city was named for Leona Shock, the first baby born there.

A post office was opened in Leona in 1873, and remained in operation until it was discontinued in 1986.

== Geography ==
Leona is located along the Wolf River.

According to the United States Census Bureau, the city has a total area of 0.05 square miles (0.13 km^{2}), all land.

== Demographics ==
Historical population
Census	Pop.	Note	%±
1880	135		—
1890	171		26.7%
1900	145		−15.2%
1910	139		−4.1%
1920	122		−12.2%
1930	118		−3.3%
1940	164		39.0%
1950	130		−20.7%
1960	110		−15.4%
1970	72		−34.5%
1980	73		1.4%
1990	39		−46.6%
2000	88		125.6%
2010	48		−45.5%
2020	41		−14.6%
U.S. Decennial Census

Leona is part of the St. Joseph, MO–KS Metropolitan Statistical Area.

=== 2020 census ===
The 2020 United States census counted 41 people, 15 households, and 11 families in Leona. The population density was 650.8 per square mile (251.3/km^{2}). There were 17 housing units at an average density of 269.8 per square mile (104.2/km^{2}). The racial makeup was 92.68% (38) white or European American (90.24% non-Hispanic white), 0.0% (0) black or African-American, 0.0% (0) Native American or Alaska Native, 0.0% (0) Asian, 0.0% (0) Pacific Islander or Native Hawaiian, 0.0% (0) from other races, and 7.32% (3) from two or more races. Hispanic or Latino of any race was 2.44% (1) of the population.

Of the 15 households, 33.3% had children under the age of 18; 46.7% were married couples living together; 6.7% had a female householder with no spouse or partner present. 13.3% of households consisted of individuals and 6.7% had someone living alone who was 65 years of age or older. The average household size was 2.6 and the average family size was 2.9. The percent of those with a bachelor's degree or higher was estimated to be 2.4% of the population.

34.1% of the population was under the age of 18, 2.4% from 18 to 24, 43.9% from 25 to 44, 14.6% from 45 to 64, and 4.9% who were 65 years of age or older. The median age was 29.5 years. For every 100 females, there were 64.0 males. For every 100 females ages 18 and older, there were 68.8 males.

=== 2010 census ===
As of the census of 2010, there were 48 people, 14 households, and 11 families residing in the city. The population density was 960.0 inhabitants per square mile (370.7/km^{2}). There were 17 housing units at an average density of 340.0 per square mile (131.3/km^{2}). The racial makeup of the city was 93.8% White, 4.2% Native American, and 2.1% from two or more races.

There were 14 households, of which 57.1% had children under the age of 18 living with them, 50.0% were married couples living together, 14.3% had a female householder with no husband present, 14.3% had a male householder with no wife present, and 21.4% were non-families. 14.3% of all households were made up of individuals, and 7.1% had someone living alone who was 65 years of age or older. The average household size was 3.43 and the average family size was 3.64.

The median age in the city was 22 years. 39.6% of residents were under the age of 18; 14.6% were between the ages of 18 and 24; 31.3% were from 25 to 44; 12.5% were from 45 to 64; and 2.1% were 65 years of age or older. The gender makeup of the city was 56.3% male and 43.8% female.

== Education ==
The community is served by Doniphan West USD 111 public school district.
