= Union Township, Doniphan County, Kansas =

Union Township
- Township
- Location in Doniphan County
- Coordinates: 39°41′53″N 095°17′19″W
- Country: United States
- State: Kansas
- County: Doniphan

Area
  - Total: 36.1 sq mi (93.6 km^{2})
  - Land: 36.11 sq mi (93.52 km^{2})
  - Water: 0.031 sq mi (0.08 km^{2}) 0.09%
- Elevation: 1,099 ft (335 m)

Population (2020)
  - Total: 276
  - Density: 7.64/sq mi (2.95/km^{2})
- GNIS feature ID: 0473270

Union Township is a township in Doniphan County, Kansas, United States. As of the 2020 census, its population was 276.

== History ==
Union Township was created in 1878.

== Geography ==
Union Township covers an area of 36.14 square miles (93.6 km^{2}) and contains one incorporated settlement, Denton. According to the USGS, it contains five cemeteries: Anderson, Denton, Robertson, Saint Marys and Victory.
