= White Cloud, Kansas =

City in Doniphan County, Kansas

White Cloud, Kansas Chína Maxúthga (Iowa-Oto)
- City
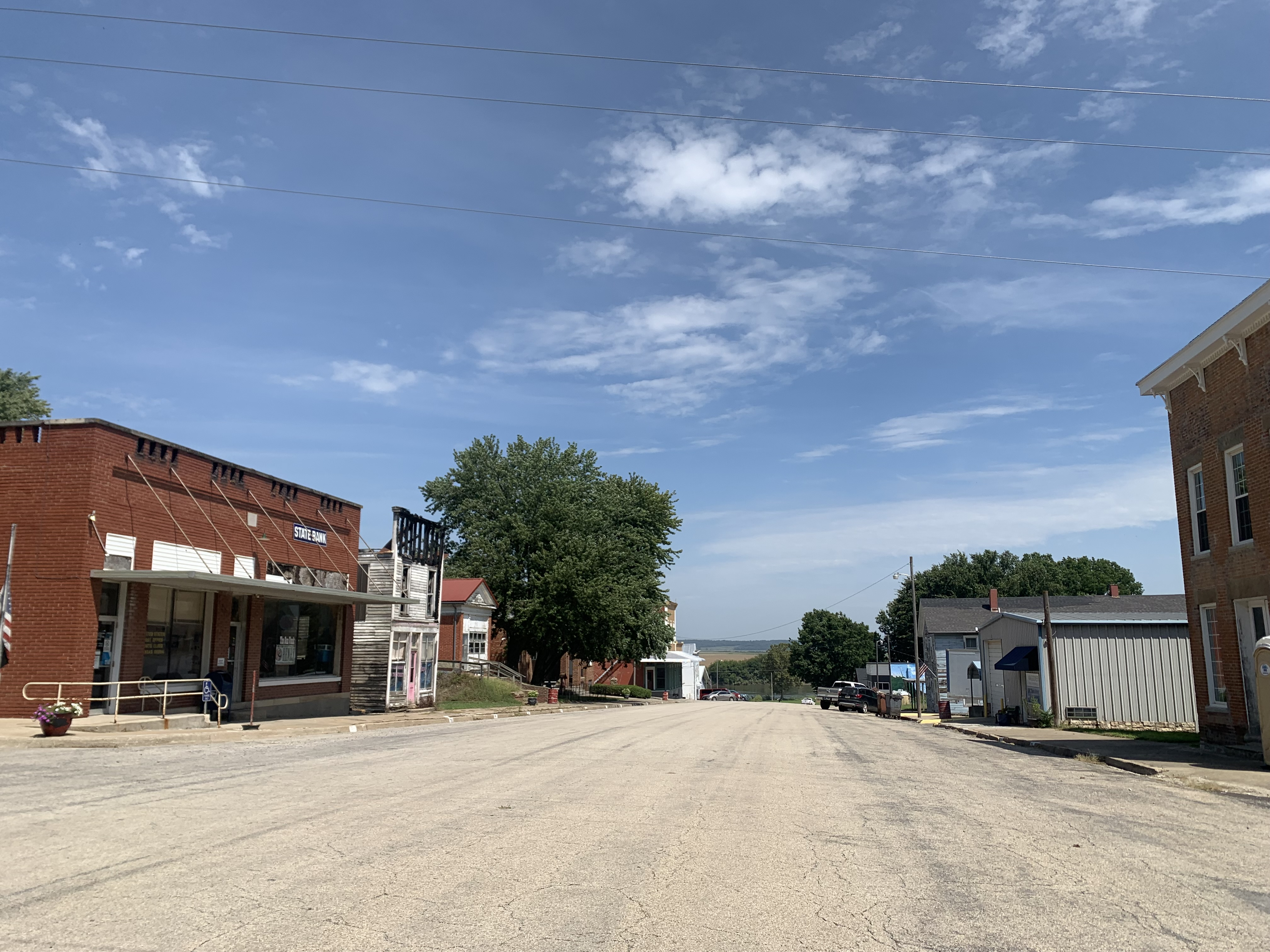
- White Cloud Downtown (2026)

- Location within Doniphan County and Kansas

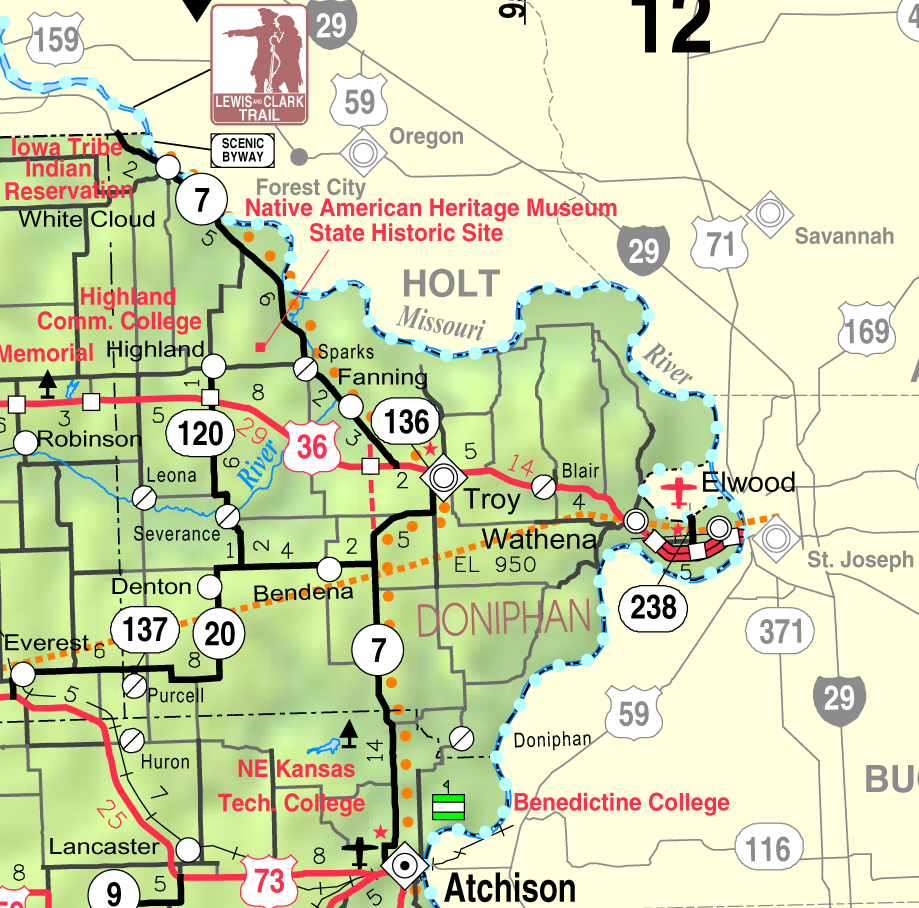
- KDOT map of Doniphan County (legend)
- Coordinates: 39°58′28″N 95°17′57″W
- Country: United States
- State: Kansas
- County: Doniphan
- Founded: 1855
- Platted: 1857
- Incorporated: 1862
- Named for: Francis White Cloud

Area
  - Total: 0.73 sq mi (1.88 km^{2})
  - Land: 0.73 sq mi (1.88 km^{2})
  - Water: 0 sq mi (0.00 km^{2})
- Elevation: 879 ft (268 m)

Population (2020)
  - Total: 115
  - Density: 158/sq mi (61.2/km^{2})
- Time zone: UTC-6 (CST)
  - Summer (DST): UTC-5 (CDT)
- ZIP Code: 66094
- Area code: 785
- FIPS code: 20-77850
- GNIS ID: 2397301
- Website: City website

White Cloud is a city in Doniphan County, Kansas, United States. As of the 2020 census, the population of the city was 115. White Cloud is the seat of government for the Iowa Tribe of Kansas and Nebraska.

== Etymology ==
The town was named for Francis White Cloud, a son of Chief White Cloud of the Iowa people. In Ioway, the town is known as Chína Maxúthga, pronounced [tʃʰiꜜnã mãxuθꜜkɐ], or Chína Maxúhga, pronounced [tʃʰiꜜnã mãxuhꜜkɐ].

== History ==
The first post office at White Cloud was established in July, 1855.

In 1857, the town site was purchased by John Utt and Enoch Spaulding, two land promoters from Oregon, Missouri, who then sold lots in the town. White Cloud prospered by taking advantage of steamboat traffic on the nearby Missouri River.

In 1913, ten-year-old Wilbur Chapman of White Cloud gained widespread publicity after raising and selling a pig for $25, which he donated to the American Mission to Lepers. An obelisk-shaped monument was installed in front of the Community Christian Church in White Cloud in Chapman's honor.

Some scenes from the 1973 movie Paper Moon were filmed in White Cloud. White Cloud is featured in episode 4 of the 2008 television documentary Stephen Fry in America.

The entire downtown district of White Cloud is listed on the National Register of Historic Places, as are the Poulet House and the White Cloud School.

== Geography ==
According to the United States Census Bureau, the city has a total area of 0.73 square miles (1.89 km^{2}), all land.

White Cloud is also the westernmost city in Kansas that is located on the Missouri River.

== Demographics ==
Historical population
Census	Pop.	Note	%±
1860	251		—
1870	843		235.9%
1880	825		−2.1%
1890	699		−15.3%
1900	713		2.0%
1910	1,119		56.9%
1920	553		−50.6%
1930	476		−13.9%
1940	479		0.6%
1950	308		−35.7%
1960	238		−22.7%
1970	210		−11.8%
1980	234		11.4%
1990	255		9.0%
2000	239		−6.3%
2010	176		−26.4%
2020	115		−34.7%
U.S. Decennial Census

White Cloud is part of the St. Joseph, MO–KS Metropolitan Statistical Area.

=== 2010 census ===
As of the census of 2010, there were 176 people, 86 households, and 44 families residing in the city. The population density was 241.1 inhabitants per square mile (93.1/km^{2}). There were 132 housing units at an average density of 180.8 per square mile (69.8/km^{2}). The racial makeup of the city was 68.2% White, 3.4% African American, 18.8% Native American, 1.1% from other races, and 8.5% from two or more races. Hispanic or Latino of any race were 5.1% of the population.

There were 86 households, of which 24.4% had children under the age of 18 living with them, 33.7% were married couples living together, 12.8% had a female householder with no husband present, 4.7% had a male householder with no wife present, and 48.8% were non-families. 40.7% of all households were made up of individuals, and 24.5% had someone living alone who was 65 years of age or older. The average household size was 2.05 and the average family size was 2.75.

The median age in the city was 44.7 years. 19.9% of residents were under the age of 18; 12.6% were between the ages of 18 and 24; 18.8% were from 25 to 44; 27.3% were from 45 to 64; and 21.6% were 65 years of age or older. The gender makeup of the city was 51.1% male and 48.9% female.

=== 2000 census ===
As of the census of 2000, there were 239 people, 108 households, and 57 families residing in the city. The population density was 329.7 inhabitants per square mile (127.3/km^{2}). There were 134 housing units at an average density of 184.8 per square mile (71.4/km^{2}). The racial makeup of the city was 70.71% White, 3.77% African American, 17.99% Native American, 1.26% Asian, 1.26% from other races, and 5.02% from two or more races. Hispanic or Latino of any race were 5.44% of the population.

There were 108 households, out of which 26.9% had children under the age of 18 living with them, 37.0% were married couples living together, 11.1% had a female householder with no husband present, and 46.3% were non-families. 36.1% of all households were made up of individuals, and 14.8% had someone living alone who was 65 years of age or older. The average household size was 2.21 and the average family size was 2.98.

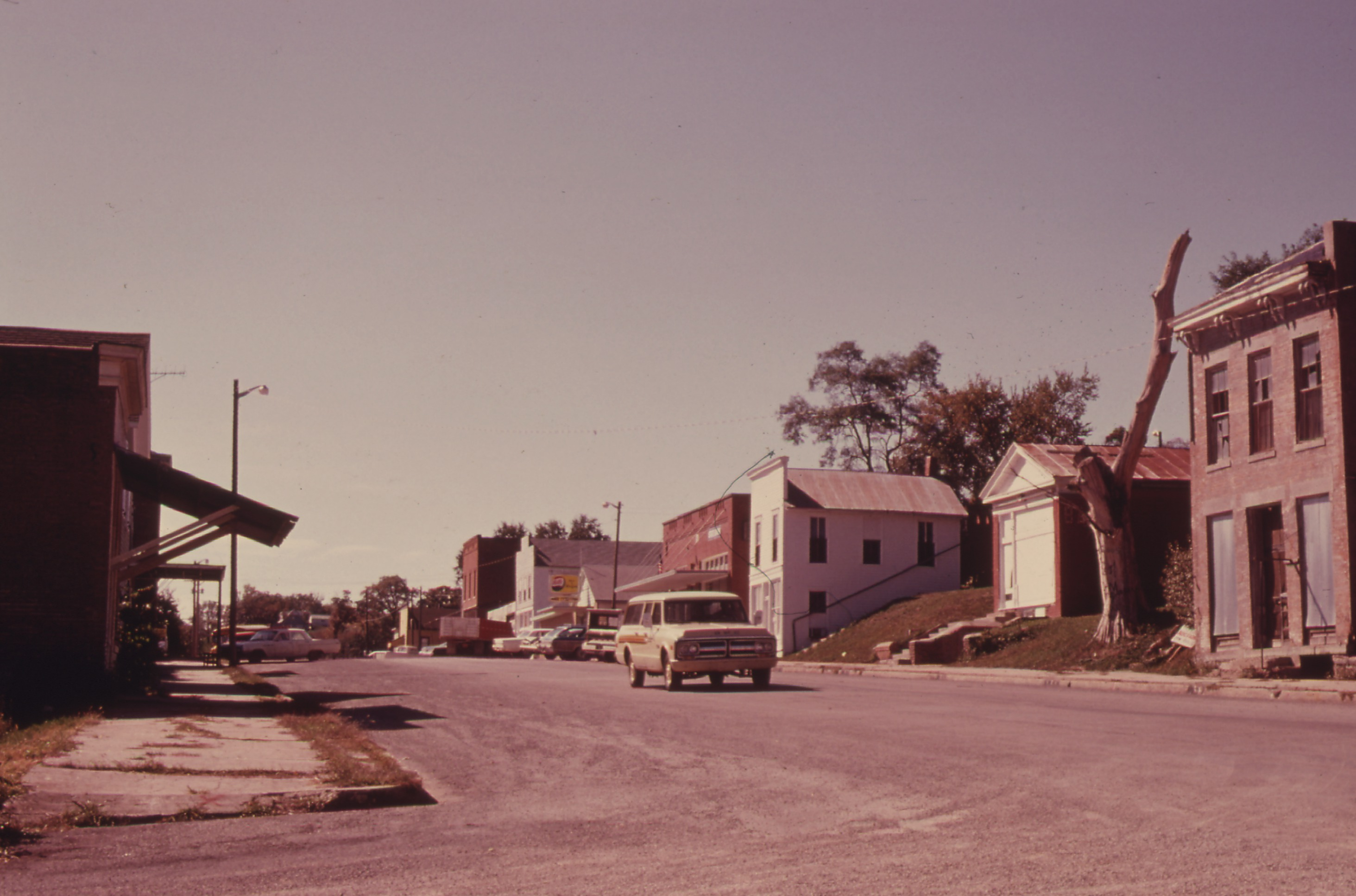
White Cloud (1974). Photo by Patricia DuBose Duncan.

In the city, the population was spread out, with 22.2% under the age of 18, 18.8% from 18 to 24, 22.2% from 25 to 44, 23.4% from 45 to 64, and 13.4% who were 65 years of age or older. The median age was 34 years. For every 100 females, there were 95.9 males. For every 100 females age 18 and over, there were 111.4 males.

The median income for a household in the city was $28,393, and the median income for a family was $34,688. Males had a median income of $25,938 versus $16,563 for females. The per capita income for the city was $17,828. About 1.9% of families and 6.1% of the population were below the poverty line, including 5.0% of those under the age of eighteen and 5.1% of those 65 or over.

== Education ==
The community is served by Doniphan West USD 111 public school district.
