= Pikes Peak Ocean to Ocean Highway =

Highway sign

Highway marker

Pikes Peak Ocean to Ocean Highway was an early coast-to-coast highway in the United States. The route crossed the nation from New York City to Los Angeles, and was in direct competition with the Lincoln Highway and the National Old Trails Road. Its route markers were marked PP-OO.

== History ==
It started as a boosterism campaign in Colorado Springs, and depended upon cities and towns along the route to participate with monetary contributions and road improvements. It was formalized March 18, 1914, at a meeting in St. Joseph, Missouri, with state and federal highway officials. The highway was completed in 1924.

The route originally was to be from Washington, D.C., to San Francisco, but the existence of the good National Old Trails Road in the east made New York City a natural terminus, and competition with the Lincoln Highway and the ease of the southern route to California determined the change to Los Angeles.

=== Colorado route ===
The route through Colorado took two different paths from Colorado Springs to Grand Junction. The first went through Manitou, Buena Vista, Leadville, and Glenwood Springs and the second went through Canon City, Salida, Montrose, and Delta.

== Route ==
East to West:

- New York:
  - New York City
- New Jersey:
  - Trenton
- Pennsylvania:
  - Philadelphia
  - Harrisburg
  - Hollidaysburg
  - Blairsville
  - Washington
- Ohio: primarily State route 7, State route 151, U.S. Route 22, U.S. Route 250, U.S. Route 36, State route 751, U.S. Route 36, State route 571
  - Coshocton
  - Bellefontaine
- Indiana: primarily what became State Road 32 and what became U.S. Route 136
  - Anderson
- Illinois:
  - Danville
  - Decatur
  - Springfield
- Missouri: primarily State Route MM, and what became U.S. Route 36
  - Hannibal
  - Chillicothe
  - St Joseph
- Kansas: primarily what became U.S. Route 36 and U.S. Route 24
  - Marysville
  - Colby
- Colorado:
  - Limon
  - Colorado Springs
    - First route through Glenwood Springs
    - Second route through Montrose
  - Grand Junction
- Utah:
  - Price
  - Beaver
  - St. George
  - Shivwits
- Arizona: primarily what became old U.S. Route 91, now a county road
  - Beaver Dam, Arizona
  - Littlefield, Arizona
- Nevada:
  - Las Vegas
- California:
  - Barstow
  - San Bernardino
  - Pasadena
  - Los Angeles
