= Denton, Kansas =

City in Doniphan County, Kansas

- City
- Location within Doniphan County and Kansas

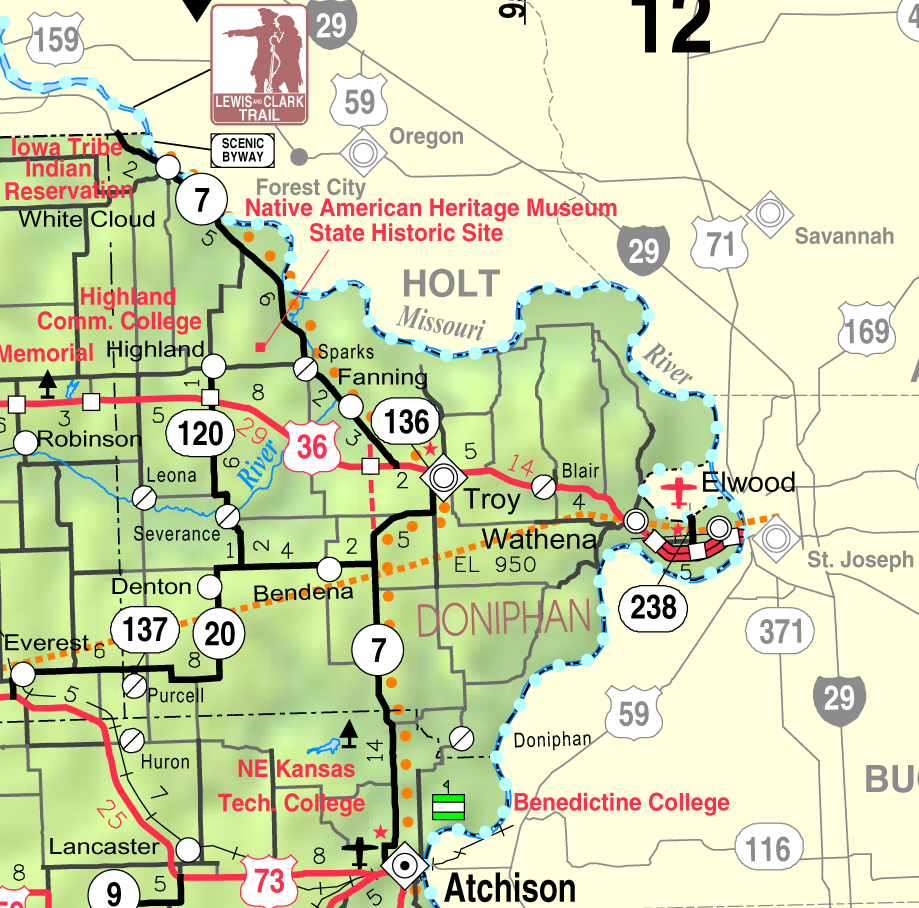
- KDOT map of Doniphan County (legend)
- Coordinates: 39°43′55″N 95°16′10″W
- Country: United States
- State: Kansas
- County: Doniphan
- Founded: 1886
- Platted: 1886
- Incorporated: 1896
- Named for: John Denton

Area
  - Total: 0.15 sq mi (0.38 km^{2})
  - Land: 0.15 sq mi (0.38 km^{2})
  - Water: 0 sq mi (0.00 km^{2})
- Elevation: 1,079 ft (329 m)

Population (2020)
  - Total: 130
  - Density: 890/sq mi (340/km^{2})
- Time zone: UTC-6 (CST)
  - Summer (DST): UTC-5 (CDT)
- ZIP Code: 66017
- Area code: 785
- FIPS code: 20-17750
- GNIS ID: 2394518
- Website: City website

Denton is a city in Doniphan County, Kansas, United States. As of the 2020 census, the population of the city was 130.

== History ==
Denton was laid out in 1886. It was named for one of its founders, John Denton.

The first post office at the site of Denton was established in 1882. Prior to 1905, it was called Darwin for some time, then Dentonville.

== Geography ==
According to the United States Census Bureau, the city has a total area of 0.14 square miles (0.36 km^{2}), all land.

== Demographics ==
Historical population
Census	Pop.	Note	%±
1900	247		—
1910	337		36.4%
1920	193		−42.7%
1930	193		0.0%
1940	156		−19.2%
1950	157		0.6%
1960	161		2.5%
1970	162		0.6%
1980	156		−3.7%
1990	166		6.4%
2000	186		12.0%
2010	148		−20.4%
2020	130		−12.2%
U.S. Decennial Census

Denton is part of the St. Joseph, MO–KS Metropolitan Statistical Area.

=== 2020 census ===
The 2020 United States census counted 130 people, 58 households, and 37 families in Denton. The population density was 896.6 per square mile (346.2/km^{2}). There were 65 housing units at an average density of 448.3 per square mile (173.1/km^{2}). The racial makeup was 91.54% (119) white or European American (91.54% non-Hispanic white), 0.0% (0) black or African-American, 0.0% (0) Native American or Alaska Native, 0.0% (0) Asian, 0.0% (0) Pacific Islander or Native Hawaiian, 0.0% (0) from other races, and 8.46% (11) from two or more races. Hispanic or Latino of any race was 0.77% (1) of the population.

Of the 58 households, 27.6% had children under the age of 18; 53.4% were married couples living together; 22.4% had a female householder with no spouse or partner present. 29.3% of households consisted of individuals and 13.8% had someone living alone who was 65 years of age or older. The average household size was 2.2 and the average family size was 2.6. The percent of those with a bachelor's degree or higher was estimated to be 20.0% of the population.

19.2% of the population was under the age of 18, 3.1% from 18 to 24, 29.2% from 25 to 44, 23.1% from 45 to 64, and 25.4% who were 65 years of age or older. The median age was 44.0 years. For every 100 females, there were 94.0 males. For every 100 females ages 18 and older, there were 101.9 males.

The 2016–2020 5-year American Community Survey estimates show that the median household income was $71,719 (with a margin of error of +/- $6,252) and the median family income was $103,125 (+/- $49,033). Males had a median income of $51,250 (+/- $11,266) versus $28,750 (+/- $8,858) for females. The median income for those above 16 years old was $42,000 (+/- $8,671). Approximately, 13.2% of families and 14.1% of the population were below the poverty line, including 27.8% of those under the age of 18 and 16.1% of those ages 65 or over.

=== 2010 census ===
As of the census of 2010, there were 148 people, 63 households, and 42 families residing in the city. The population density was 1,057.1 inhabitants per square mile (408.1/km^{2}). There were 74 housing units at an average density of 528.6 per square mile (204.1/km^{2}). The racial makeup of the city was 93.9% White and 6.1% from two or more races. Hispanic or Latino of any race were 2.0% of the population.

There were 63 households, of which 36.5% had children under the age of 18 living with them, 50.8% were married couples living together, 9.5% had a female householder with no husband present, 6.3% had a male householder with no wife present, and 33.3% were non-families. 33.3% of all households were made up of individuals, and 15.8% had someone living alone who was 65 years of age or older. The average household size was 2.35 and the average family size was 2.95.

The median age in the city was 43.5 years. 20.9% of residents were under the age of 18; 12.2% were between the ages of 18 and 24; 18.3% were from 25 to 44; 36.5% were from 45 to 64; and 12.2% were 65 years of age or older. The gender makeup of the city was 50.0% male and 50.0% female.

=== 2000 census ===
As of the census of 2000, there were 186 people, 71 households, and 47 families residing in the city. The population density was 1,286.4 inhabitants per square mile (496.7/km^{2}). There were 74 housing units at an average density of 511.8 per square mile (197.6/km^{2}). The racial makeup of the city was 99.46% White, and 0.54% from two or more races. Hispanic or Latino of any race were 0.54% of the population.

There were 71 households, out of which 38.0% had children under the age of 18 living with them, 62.0% were married couples living together, 2.8% had a female householder with no husband present, and 33.8% were non-families. 32.4% of all households were made up of individuals, and 22.5% had someone living alone who was 65 years of age or older. The average household size was 2.62 and the average family size was 3.40.

In the city, the population was spread out, with 33.9% under the age of 18, 4.8% from 18 to 24, 29.0% from 25 to 44, 15.1% from 45 to 64, and 17.2% who were 65 years of age or older. The median age was 35 years. For every 100 females, there were 95.8 males. For every 100 females age 18 and over, there were 89.2 males.

The median income for a household in the city was $30,500, and the median income for a family was $40,625. Males had a median income of $31,875 versus $20,417 for females. The per capita income for the city was $12,872. None of the families and 4.5% of the population were living below the poverty line, including no under eighteens and 6.9% of those over 64.

== Education ==
The community is served by Doniphan West USD 111 public school district.
