= Troy, Kansas =

City in Doniphan County, Kansas

- City and County seat
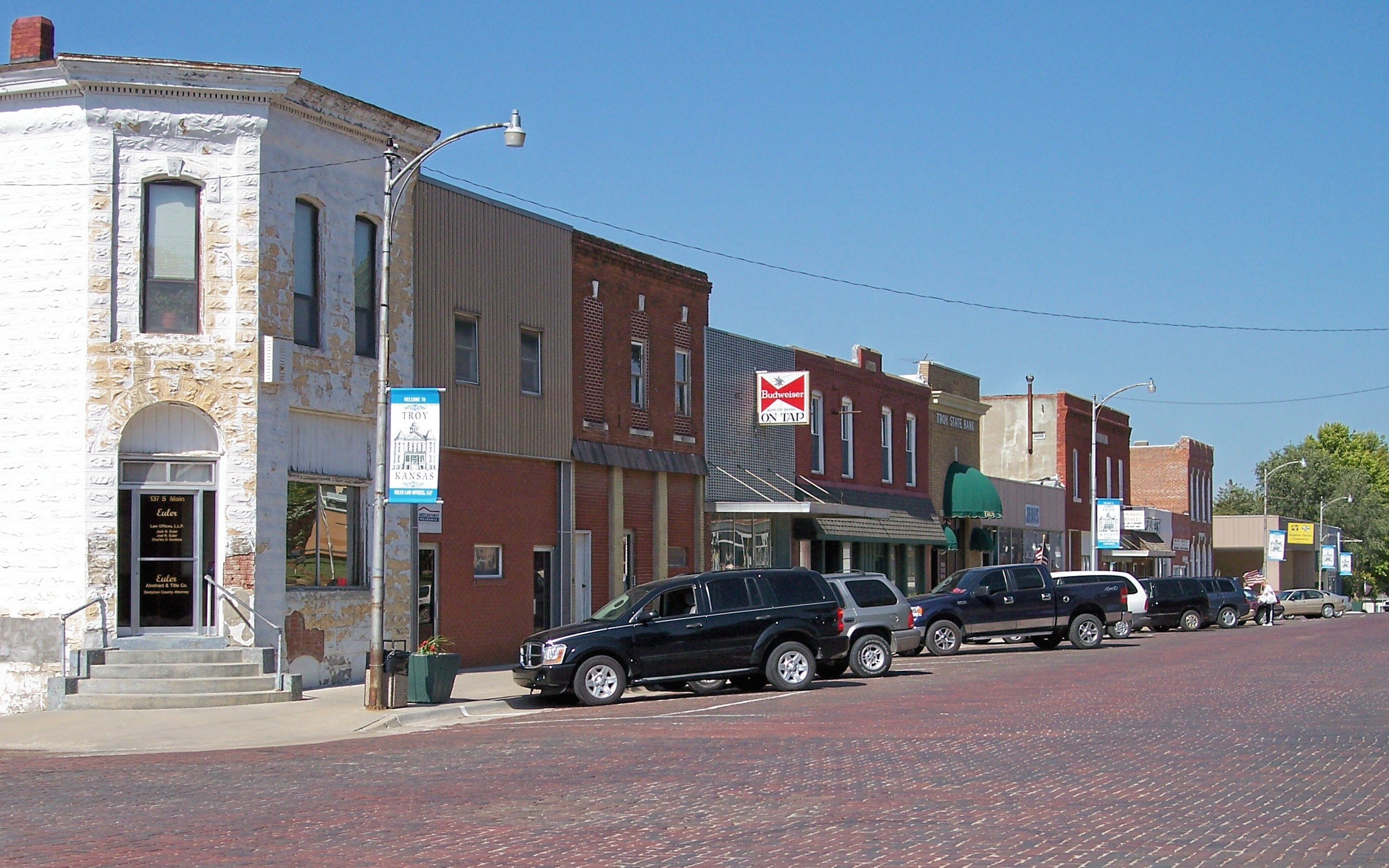
- Troy business district with brick street (2006)

- Location within Doniphan County and Kansas

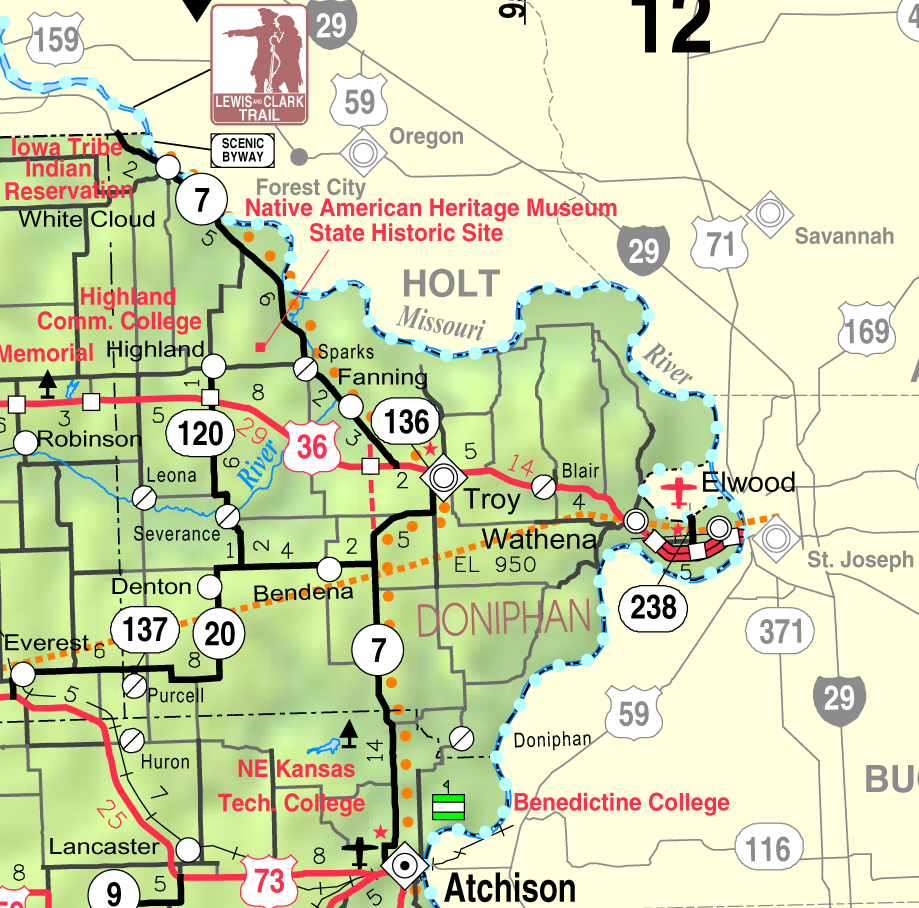
- KDOT map of Doniphan County (legend)
- Coordinates: 39°47′05″N 95°05′37″W
- Country: United States
- State: Kansas
- County: Doniphan
- Founded: 1855
- Incorporated: 1860
- Named for: Troy

Government
  - Type: Mayor–Council
  - Mayor: Micheal Brissett

Area
  - Total: 0.98 sq mi (2.54 km^{2})
  - Land: 0.97 sq mi (2.52 km^{2})
  - Water: 0.0077 sq mi (0.02 km^{2})
- Elevation: 1,089 ft (332 m)

Population (2020)
  - Total: 964
  - Density: 991/sq mi (383/km^{2})
- Time zone: UTC-6 (CST)
  - Summer (DST): UTC-5 (CDT)
- ZIP Code: 66087
- Area code: 785
- FIPS code: 20-71575
- GNIS ID: 2397063
- Website: troykansas.com

Troy is a city in and the county seat of Doniphan County, Kansas, United States. As of the 2020 census, the population of the city was 964.

== History ==
Troy was platted in 1855. It was named after the ancient city of Troy. The first house in Troy was built in 1856, and the first store opened in 1857. Troy was incorporated as a city in 1860. The first post office in Troy was established in March, 1857.

Troy grew up from humble beginnings along the wagon route from St. Joseph, Missouri to Oregon and California. British explorer Richard Francis Burton en route to California in 1860 noted: "Passing through a few wretched shanties called Troy ..."

== Geography ==
According to the United States Census Bureau, the city has a total area of 0.99 square miles (2.56 km^{2}), of which 0.98 square miles (2.54 km^{2}) is land and 0.01 square miles (0.03 km^{2}) is water.

=== Climate ===
Climate data for Troy 3N, Kansas (1991–2020 normals, extremes 1950–present)
Month	Jan	Feb	Mar	Apr	May	Jun	Jul	Aug	Sep	Oct	Nov	Dec	Year
Record high °F (°C)	73 (23)	79 (26)	89 (32)	94 (34)	97 (36)	103 (39)	106 (41)	106 (41)	103 (39)	95 (35)	83 (28)	72 (22)	106 (41)
Mean maximum °F (°C)	60.6 (15.9)	65.3 (18.5)	77.4 (25.2)	84.6 (29.2)	88.7 (31.5)	92.6 (33.7)	96.3 (35.7)	95.8 (35.4)	91.6 (33.1)	85.7 (29.8)	72.7 (22.6)	63.0 (17.2)	97.6 (36.4)
Mean daily maximum °F (°C)	36.0 (2.2)	41.5 (5.3)	53.7 (12.1)	64.5 (18.1)	74.2 (23.4)	82.9 (28.3)	86.7 (30.4)	85.4 (29.7)	78.7 (25.9)	67.0 (19.4)	52.5 (11.4)	40.0 (4.4)	63.6 (17.6)
Daily mean °F (°C)	26.5 (−3.1)	31.2 (−0.4)	42.5 (5.8)	53.0 (11.7)	63.6 (17.6)	72.9 (22.7)	76.9 (24.9)	74.9 (23.8)	67.3 (19.6)	55.4 (13.0)	42.2 (5.7)	31.0 (−0.6)	53.1 (11.7)
Mean daily minimum °F (°C)	17.0 (−8.3)	20.9 (−6.2)	31.2 (−0.4)	41.6 (5.3)	53.1 (11.7)	63.0 (17.2)	67.0 (19.4)	64.5 (18.1)	55.9 (13.3)	43.8 (6.6)	31.8 (−0.1)	22.0 (−5.6)	42.6 (5.9)
Mean minimum °F (°C)	−5.0 (−20.6)	1.3 (−17.1)	10.7 (−11.8)	25.4 (−3.7)	38.0 (3.3)	49.5 (9.7)	54.8 (12.7)	52.6 (11.4)	38.6 (3.7)	26.0 (−3.3)	14.4 (−9.8)	1.8 (−16.8)	−8.4 (−22.4)
Record low °F (°C)	−18 (−28)	−23 (−31)	−13 (−25)	8 (−13)	26 (−3)	40 (4)	45 (7)	43 (6)	30 (−1)	17 (−8)	−7 (−22)	−22 (−30)	−23 (−31)
Average precipitation inches (mm)	0.97 (25)	1.37 (35)	2.23 (57)	3.75 (95)	5.13 (130)	4.50 (114)	5.00 (127)	3.90 (99)	3.40 (86)	3.06 (78)	1.96 (50)	1.57 (40)	36.84 (936)
Average snowfall inches (cm)	5.5 (14)	5.9 (15)	2.2 (5.6)	0.8 (2.0)	0.1 (0.25)	0.0 (0.0)	0.0 (0.0)	0.0 (0.0)	0.0 (0.0)	0.3 (0.76)	1.3 (3.3)	5.0 (13)	21.1 (54)
Average precipitation days (≥ 0.01 in)	6.6	6.4	8.8	10.5	11.5	10.3	9.4	8.6	8.0	8.2	6.2	6.4	100.9
Average snowy days (≥ 0.1 in)	3.7	3.2	1.7	0.5	0.0	0.0	0.0	0.0	0.0	0.2	0.8	3.1	13.2
Source: NOAA

== Demographics ==
Historical population
Census	Pop.	Note	%±
1860	131		—
1870	639		387.8%
1880	694		8.6%
1890	730		5.2%
1900	750		2.7%
1910	940		25.3%
1920	1,013		7.8%
1930	1,042		2.9%
1940	1,049		0.7%
1950	977		−6.9%
1960	1,051		7.6%
1970	1,047		−0.4%
1980	1,240		18.4%
1990	1,073		−13.5%
2000	1,054		−1.8%
2010	1,010		−4.2%
2020	964		−4.6%
U.S. Decennial Census

Troy is part of the St. Joseph, Missouri Metropolitan Area.

=== 2020 census ===
As of the census of 2020, there were 964 people and 375 households in the city. The racial makeup of the city was 94.2% White, 0.6% African American, 0.2% Native American, 0.3% Asian, 0.6% from other races, and 4% from two or more races. Hispanic or Latino of any race were 2.4% of the population.

There were 375 households, of which 22.6% had children under the age of 18 living with them.

The median age in the city was 44.2 years. 22.6% of residents were under the age of 18; 8.8% were between the ages of 18 and 24; 20.1% were from 25 to 44; 32.8% were from 45 to 64; and 13.9% were 65 years of age or older. The gender makeup of the city was 52.8% male and 57.2% female.

=== 2010 census ===
As of the census of 2010, there were 1,010 people, 421 households, and 275 families residing in the city. The population density was 1,030.6 inhabitants per square mile (397.9/km^{2}). There were 467 housing units at an average density of 476.5 per square mile (184.0/km^{2}). The racial makeup of the city was 97.3% White, 0.5% African American, 0.2% Native American, 0.3% Asian, 0.2% from other races, and 1.5% from two or more races. Hispanic or Latino of any race were 2.7% of the population.

There were 421 households, of which 31.4% had children under the age of 18 living with them, 49.6% were married couples living together, 10.0% had a female householder with no husband present, 5.7% had a male householder with no wife present, and 34.7% were non-families. 30.9% of all households were made up of individuals, and 16.1% had someone living alone who was 65 years of age or older. The average household size was 2.38 and the average family size was 2.95.

The median age in the city was 39.1 years. 24.7% of residents were under the age of 18; 8.8% were between the ages of 18 and 24; 23.9% were from 25 to 44; 24.9% were from 45 to 64; and 17.3% were 65 years of age or older. The gender makeup of the city was 48.3% male and 51.7% female.

== Education ==
The community is served by Troy USD 429 public school district.

== Notable people ==
- Chloe Gartner, American novelist.
- Charles "Buffalo" Jones, American frontiersman, farmer, rancher, hunter, and conservationist who cofounded Garden City, Kansas.
- Charles Evans Whittaker, Associate Justice of the United States Supreme Court from 1957 to 1962
