= Severance, Kansas =

City in the United States

- City
- Location within Doniphan County and Kansas

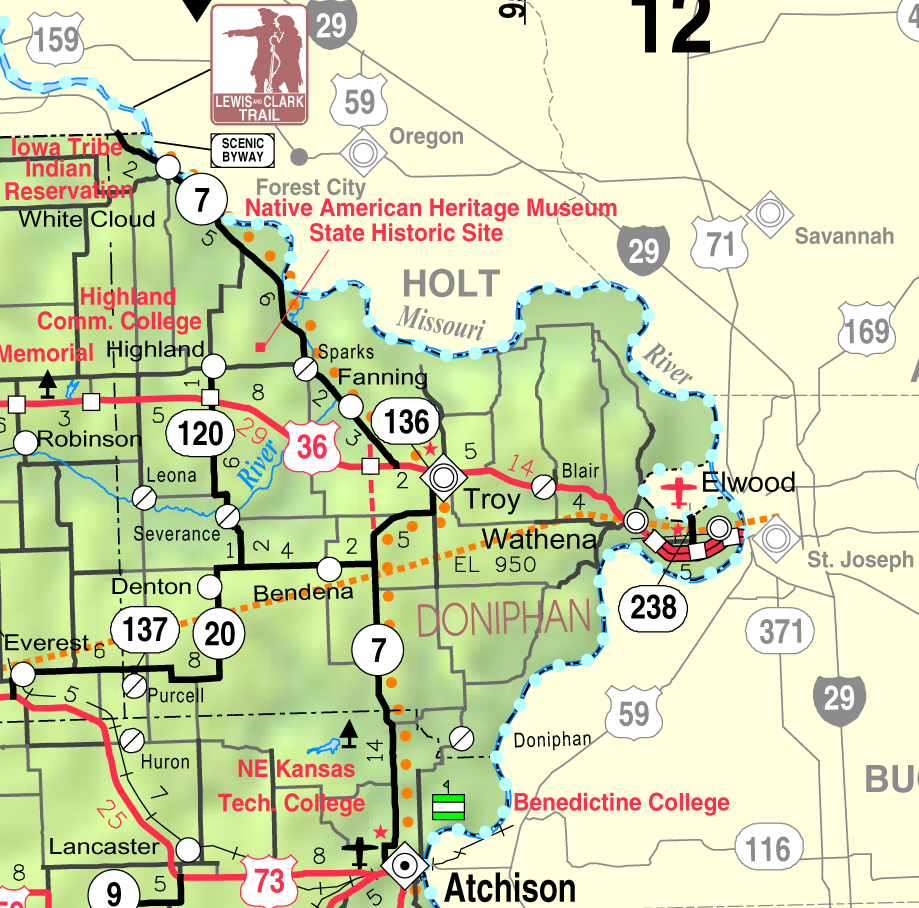
- KDOT map of Doniphan County (legend)
- Coordinates: 39°46′00″N 95°15′01″W
- Country: United States
- State: Kansas
- County: Doniphan
- Founded: 1869
- Platted: 1869
- Incorporated: 1877
- Named for: John Severance

Area
  - Total: 0.14 sq mi (0.36 km^{2})
  - Land: 0.14 sq mi (0.36 km^{2})
  - Water: 0 sq mi (0.00 km^{2})
- Elevation: 948 ft (289 m)

Population (2020)
  - Total: 76
  - Density: 550/sq mi (210/km^{2})
- Time zone: UTC-6 (CST)
  - Summer (DST): UTC-5 (CDT)
- ZIP Code: 66087
- Area code: 785
- FIPS code: 20-64025
- GNIS ID: 2396577
- Website: City website

Severance is a city in Doniphan County, Kansas, United States. As of the 2020 census, the population of the city was 76.

== History ==
Severance was laid out in 1869. It was named for John Severance, one of its founders. A railroad depot was built in Severance in 1874. Severance was incorporated as a city in 1877.

A post office was opened in Severance in 1869, and remained in operation until it was discontinued in 1992.

== Geography ==
Severance is located along the Wolf River. According to the United States Census Bureau, the city has a total area of 0.14 square miles (0.36 km^{2}), all land.

== Demographics ==
Historical population
Census	Pop.	Note	%±
1880	375		—
1890	377		0.5%
1900	424		12.5%
1910	383		−9.7%
1920	350		−8.6%
1930	312		−10.9%
1940	266		−14.7%
1950	197		−25.9%
1960	146		−25.9%
1970	128		−12.3%
1980	134		4.7%
1990	98		−26.9%
2000	108		10.2%
2010	94		−13.0%
2020	76		−19.1%
U.S. Decennial Census

=== 2010 census ===
As of the census of 2010, there were 94 people, 39 households, and 21 families residing in the city. The population density was 671.4 inhabitants per square mile (259.2/km^{2}). There were 49 housing units at an average density of 350.0 per square mile (135.1/km^{2}). The racial makeup of the city was 100.0% White.

There were 39 households, of which 25.6% had children under the age of 18 living with them, 41.0% were married couples living together, 10.3% had a female householder with no husband present, 2.6% had a male householder with no wife present, and 46.2% were non-families. 38.5% of all households were made up of individuals, and 20.6% had someone living alone who was 65 years of age or older. The average household size was 2.41 and the average family size was 3.29.

The median age in the city was 43.5 years. 25.5% of residents were under the age of 18; 9.6% were between the ages of 18 and 24; 17.1% were from 25 to 44; 29.7% were from 45 to 64; and 18.1% were 65 years of age or older. The gender makeup of the city was 47.9% male and 52.1% female.

=== 2000 census ===
As of the census of 2000, there were 108 people, 46 households, and 28 families residing in the city. The population density was 841.8 inhabitants per square mile (325.0/km^{2}). There were 53 housing units at an average density of 413.1 per square mile (159.5/km^{2}). The racial makeup of the city was 100.00% White.

There were 46 households, out of which 34.8% had children under the age of 18 living with them, 43.5% were married couples living together, 15.2% had a female householder with no husband present, and 37.0% were non-families. 32.6% of all households were made up of individuals, and 15.2% had someone living alone who was 65 years of age or older. The average household size was 2.35 and the average family size was 3.00.

In the city, the population was spread out, with 28.7% under the age of 18, 8.3% from 18 to 24, 25.9% from 25 to 44, 24.1% from 45 to 64, and 13.0% who were 65 years of age or older. The median age was 34 years. For every 100 females, there were 96.4 males. For every 100 females age 18 and over, there were 102.6 males.

The median income for a household in the city was $25,313, and the median income for a family was $27,083. Males had a median income of $25,625 versus $15,500 for females. The per capita income for the city was $13,690. There were 21.4% of families and 26.6% of the population living below the poverty line, including 41.9% of under eighteens and 29.4% of those over 64.

== Education ==
The community is served by Doniphan West USD 111 public school district.

== Notable people ==
Harry Chapman, catcher in Major League Baseball
