= National Register of Historic Places listings in Doniphan County, Kansas =

Location of Doniphan County in Kansas

This is a list of the National Register of Historic Places listings in Doniphan County, Kansas.

This is intended to be a complete list of the properties and districts on the National Register of Historic Places in Doniphan County, Kansas, United States. The locations of National Register properties and districts for which the latitude and longitude coordinates are included below, may be seen in a map.

There are 36 properties and districts listed on the National Register in the county. Six properties were once listed, but have since been delisted.

This National Park Service list is complete through NPS recent listings posted July 10, 2026.

== Current listings ==
	Name on the Register	Image	Date listed	Location	City or town	Description
1	Albert Albers Barn	Albert Albers Barn	May 7, 1987 (#86003552)	South of Bendena; 39°41′13″N 95°10′52″W	Bendena	Destroyed in 1989 fire
2	Nicholas Bohr Barn	Nicholas Bohr Barn	May 7, 1987 (#86003531)	Southeast of Troy; 39°43′35″N 95°02′49″W	Troy	
3	Brenner Vineyards Historic District	Brenner Vineyards Historic District	May 24, 2005 (#04001514)	Southwest of the junction of Mineral Point and 95th Rds. 39°38′26″N 95°05′09″W	Doniphan	Brenner Corncrib (6) and Pump House (8) no longer extant as of May 2026
4	Herman Chrystal Barn		May 7, 1987 (#86003538)	West of Wathena; 39°44′14″N 95°00′45″W	Wathena	Demolished in 2025
5	Doniphan Archeological Site		March 1, 1974 (#74000825)	Address restricted	Doniphan	
6	Doniphan County Courthouse	Doniphan County Courthouse	July 15, 1974 (#74000826)	Courthouse Sq., bounded by Walnut, Liberty, Chestnut, and Main Sts. 39°47′10″N 95°05′20″W	Troy	
7	Doniphan County Courthouse Square Historic District	Doniphan County Courthouse Square Historic District	July 3, 2002 (#02000717)	Roughly bounded by E. Walnut, E. Chestnut, S. Main, and S. Liberty Sts. 39°47′10″N 95°05′21″W	Troy	
8	Doniphan County Waddell Truss Bridge	Doniphan County Waddell Truss Bridge	January 4, 1990 (#89002185)	Troy City Park, W. Myrtle St. 39°47′17″N 95°05′41″W	Troy	
9	Mathew Eylar Barn No. 1	Mathew Eylar Barn No. 1	May 7, 1987 (#86003549)	South of Denton off K-20; 39°39′15″N 95°15′47″W	Denton	
10	Mathew Eylar Barn No. 2	Mathew Eylar Barn No. 2	May 7, 1987 (#86003550)	Southeast of Denton off K-20; 39°39′47″N 95°14′30″W	Denton	
11	Fanning Archeological Site		June 20, 1972 (#72000492)	Address restricted	Fanning	
12	John R. Hale Barn	John R. Hale Barn	May 7, 1987 (#86003545)	K-120; 39°48′32″N 95°15′57″W	Highland	
13	George Hanson Barn	George Hanson Barn	May 7, 1987 (#86003548)	South of Leona; 39°45′58″N 95°19′15″W	Leona	
14	Highland Christian Church	Highland Christian Church	April 4, 2007 (#07000250)	102 E. Main St. 39°51′35″N 95°15′53″W	Highland	
15	Highland Presbyterian Church	Highland Presbyterian Church	April 4, 2007 (#07000248)	101 South Ave. 39°51′34″N 95°16′16″W	Highland	
16	Iowa, Sac, and Fox Presbyterian Mission	Iowa, Sac, and Fox Presbyterian Mission	December 2, 1970 (#70000248)	1.5 miles east of Highland on U.S. Route 36 and 0.2 miles north on K-136; 39°51′51″N 95°13′45″W	Highland	
17	Irvin Hall, Highland Community Junior College	Irvin Hall, Highland Community Junior College	February 24, 1971 (#71000307)	Highland Community College campus 39°51′36″N 95°16′13″W	Highland	
18	Fred W. Kienhoff Barn	Fred W. Kienhoff Barn	May 7, 1987 (#86003537)	West of Wathena; 39°43′34″N 95°02′21″W	Wathena	Collapsed prior to May 2026
19	George Kinkhead Barn	George Kinkhead Barn	May 7, 1987 (#86003542)	Off U.S. Route 36; 39°47′31″N 95°05′05″W	Troy	
20	Lincoln School, District 2	Lincoln School, District 2	June 27, 2014 (#14000348)	410 N. 9th St. 39°45′31″N 94°52′51″W	Elwood	
21	Abram M. Minier House	Abram M. Minier House	April 7, 2014 (#14000115)	307 South Ave. 39°51′24″N 95°16′16″W	Highland	Part of the Highland, Doniphan County, Kansas MPS
22	Godfrey Nuzum Barn	Godfrey Nuzum Barn	May 7, 1987 (#86003533)	K-7; 39°53′27″N 95°12′37″W	Sparks	
23	Poulet House	Poulet House	September 3, 1971 (#71000308)	Poplar St. between 1st and 2nd Sts. 39°58′41″N 95°17′49″W	White Cloud	
24	St. Benedict's Church	St. Benedict's Church	April 9, 1998 (#98000324)	5 miles southwest of Bendena; 39°43′08″N 95°13′52″W	Bendena	
25	St. Martha's AME Church and Parsonage	St. Martha's AME Church and Parsonage	July 20, 2000 (#00000757)	101 S. Canada; 39°51′34″N 95°15′43″W	Highland	
26	St. Mary's Catholic Church	St. Mary's Catholic Church	April 25, 2001 (#01000413)	446 K-137; 39°40′54″N 95°19′49″W	Purcell	
27	John Silvers Barn	John Silvers Barn	May 7, 1987 (#86003553)	North of Wathena; 39°49′56″N 94°57′33″W	Wathena	
28	Site No. RH00-062	Site No. RH00-062	June 19, 1987 (#87001001)	6½ miles southeast of Rulo, Nebraska and 200 feet west of the road between White Cloud, Kansas and Rulo; 40°00′00″N 95°19′55″W	Iowa Township	Extends into Brown County, Kansas and Richardson County, Nebraska
29	John Streib Barn		May 7, 1987 (#86003547)	North of Leona; 39°47′38″N 95°19′13″W	Leona	No longer extant as of February 2024
30	J.A. Symns Barn	J.A. Symns Barn	May 7, 1987 (#86003536)	K-7; 39°40′35″N 95°08′30″W	Bendena	
31	Wathena Fruit Growers' Association Building	Wathena Fruit Growers' Association Building	December 17, 2009 (#09001092)	104 3rd St. 39°45′34″N 94°56′52″W	Wathena	
32	T.L. White Barn	T.L. White Barn	May 7, 1987 (#86003544)	K-7; 39°40′31″N 95°08′39″W	Bendena	
33	White Cloud Historic District	White Cloud Historic District	June 28, 1996 (#96000701)	Roughly bounded by Poplar, 6th, and Chestnut Sts. and K-7; 39°58′34″N 95°17′49″W	White Cloud	As of December 2025, the following buildings were no longer extant: Cooper House. Northwest corner of 2nd & Poplar; Beckett, James M. & Anna, House. Northeast corner of 2nd & Poplar; White Cloud School/St. Joseph's Church. South side Poplar between 3rd & 4th; Lynds Shed. Southwest corner 1st & Poplar; and Macy, H.F. House. East side 1st Street between Poplar & Main.
34	White Cloud School	White Cloud School	April 13, 1973 (#73000752)	Southwestern corner of 5th and Main Sts. 39°58′30″N 95°17′59″W	White Cloud	
35	M. D. L. Williams Barn	M. D. L. Williams Barn	May 7, 1987 (#86003551)	3 miles south of K-20; 39°40′59″N 95°12′27″W	Bendena	
36	A.L. Wynkoop House	A.L. Wynkoop House	April 4, 2007 (#07000251)	307 W. Pennsylvania; 39°51′27″N 95°16′05″W	Highland	

== Former listings ==
	Name on the Register	Image	Date listed	Date removed	Location	City or town	Description
1	Dorland Building		December 1, 1978 (#78001278)	April 3, 1986	Main St.	White Cloud	
2	Eclipse School		March 7, 1988 (#88000200)	December 16, 2004	210 Roseport Road (formerly Off US 36 NE of Troy); 39°45′00″N 94°52′18″W	Elwood, (formerly Troy vicinity)	Delisted due to relocation to Elwood.
3	First National Bank Building		July 2, 2008 (#08000609)	November 26, 2024	422-424 W. Main St. 39°51′35″N 95°16′08″W	Highland	
4	Benjamin Harding House		August 29, 1977 (#77000578)	December 16, 2004	308 N. 5th	Wathena	
5	Highland Water Tower		April 4, 2007 (#07000249)	December 29, 2015	Junction of N. Genesee and W. Illinois Sts. 39°51′37″N 95°16′02″W	Highland	Dismantled in June, 2015
6	Mission-Herring Barn		May 7, 1987 (#86003535)	December 16, 2004	US 36	Highland vicinity	

== See also ==
- List of National Historic Landmarks in Kansas
- National Register of Historic Places listings in Kansas
