= Wathena =

Wathena may refer to:

- Wathena (chief), a Native American chief of the Kickapoo tribe
- Wathena, Kansas
- USS Wathena (ID-3884), a cargo ship in commission in 1919
- USS Wathena (YTB-825), a harbor tug placed in service in 1973
