= Sophie Rubeti =

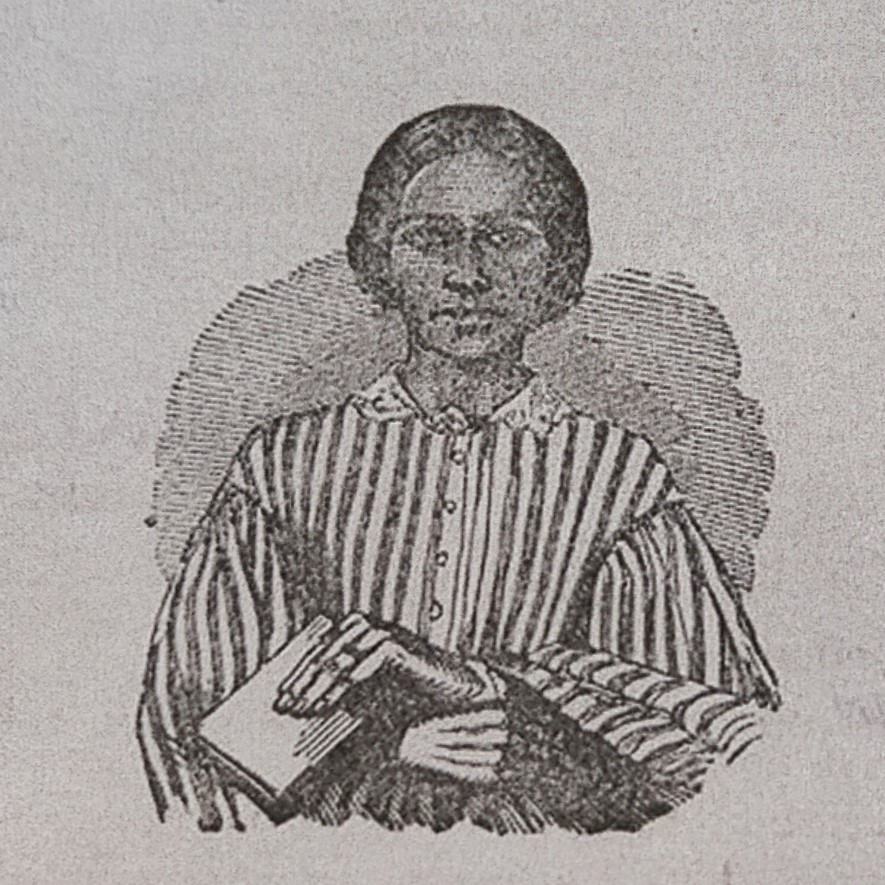
- Born: c. 1843
- Died: 1861; Highland, Kansas, US

Sophie Rubeti was a young girl whose bequest built the Rubeti Lodge, a home for Indian girls in Highland, Kansas.

== Early life ==
Rubeti was born c.1843 to a Sac and Fox mother and a father of French-Canadian descent. Her father was set to become a Catholic priest but instead decided to move west with the Indians and work for the American Fur Company. Sophies mother and father died in the summer of 1851 when she was around 8 years old. Sophie and her two younger sisters were brought to the Iowa and Sac & Fox Mission. The oldest two sisters walked to the mission on foot with the youngest being carried by a missionary. Sophie quickly adhered to the Christian faith being taught to her at the mission by Samuel M. Irvin and was quite devout until her death. Her health started to decline sometime after 1855 until her confirmed diagnosis of Consumption (disease) that would eventually take her in 1861.

== Death ==
On her death bed she spoke extensively about her fate to those who were attending to her in her final moments including her sisters.

"...I am done with the world; I am ready to go... I am going very soon, and I want all to be quiet and the room to be still and no one to cry or make a noise, that I may go quietly away and be at rest."

In her final moments fighting against death, she spoke of band playing from the village even after being told that no such event was happening.

"Is not the village band playing this evening?... I hear delightful music... it is delightful, listen... I have now lost the use of one of my hands (it was cold in death) but if I could use it, I would raise it and clap both my hands for joy."

in her last breath she spoke of Jesus coming to raise her up from the earth and then laid lifeless on the bed after the remark.

"Jesus is coming--they are coming--raise me up."

It seems that Sophie knew of her demise far before the actual event by verses found in her bible cover that she had written before she bed ridden (shown below).

"Worlds should not bribe me back to tread

Again Life's weary waste

To see again my days o'erspread

With all the gloomy past.

"My home henceforth is in the skies,

Earth, sea, and sun adieu

All heaven unfolded to my eyes,

I have no sight for you."

== Sophie’s contribution ==
Before Sophie’s death, she had 200 dollars that she had saved up from dividends from the tribe and those funds were deposited into a savings bank and trust in St. Joseph, Missouri. The evening before her death she instructed "Of that money at St. Joseph, I want you to give one hundred to the ' Highland University, ' and one hundred in any way you think best to teach little children about Jesus."

== Rubeti Lodge ==
After Sophie’s death, Sabbath school scholars in Glasgow, Scotland had learned of her story and made a $100 donation for a Dormitory to be built in her honor. in 1869 enough money had been obtained to finally make the honorary building. Before obtaining the name "Rubeti Hall" it was often referred to as "The Boarding house" and the "Indian Home". Rubeti Hall was a girl's dorm until 1964 when it was converted to a boy's dorm and then was demolished in 1978 in order to build Culbertson Auditorium. Bricks from the fireplace of the dorm were used in a memorial outside of Irvin Hall in remembrance of the 110-year-old building that was razed and the girl it was named after. The memorial however does not use any of the beforementioned names opting for the name "Rubeti Lodge".

== Sophie’s ghost ==
Whilst in use Rubeti hall was said to be haunted with residents claiming to hear sounds of disembodied footsteps and scraping chairs on the vacant 3rd floor. Two dorm parents of the hall said they would hear footsteps upstairs during the holidays while no one was there and would find small "woman-like" footsteps left in the dust. They would hear running water and wet sinks without any probable explanation. Sophie is described as friendly or at least non hostile with stories of her ghostly presence in the auditorium being spread to this day.
