= Mattie Lee Starr Lyle =

African-American in 1939 discrimination case

Mattie Lee Starr Lyle (December 4, 1902 – April 9, 1995) was an African-American woman who won a discrimination suit after being denied entrance to the State Theater in Fort Collins, Colorado in 1939.

== Early life ==
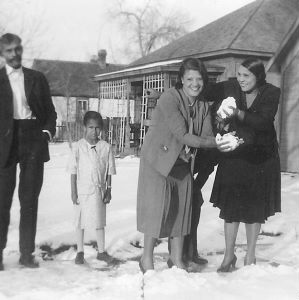
Mattie Lyle, far right; William Lyle, crouching behind, second from right; unidentified woman, center; Joyce Lyle, second from left; unidentified man, far left; circa early 1930s

Mattie Lee Starr Lyle was born on December 4, 1902, in Kansas to Charles Hendricks Starr and Lucy Jane Clark Starr. She grew up in Highland, Kansas, and attended college at Kansas State Normal School (now known as Emporia State University). While studying there she met her future husband, William Lyle. They both graduated with teaching degrees. William and Mattie Lyle were married on June 14th, 1923 in St. Martha's AME Church and Parsonage in Highland, Kansas.

== Life in Fort Collins ==
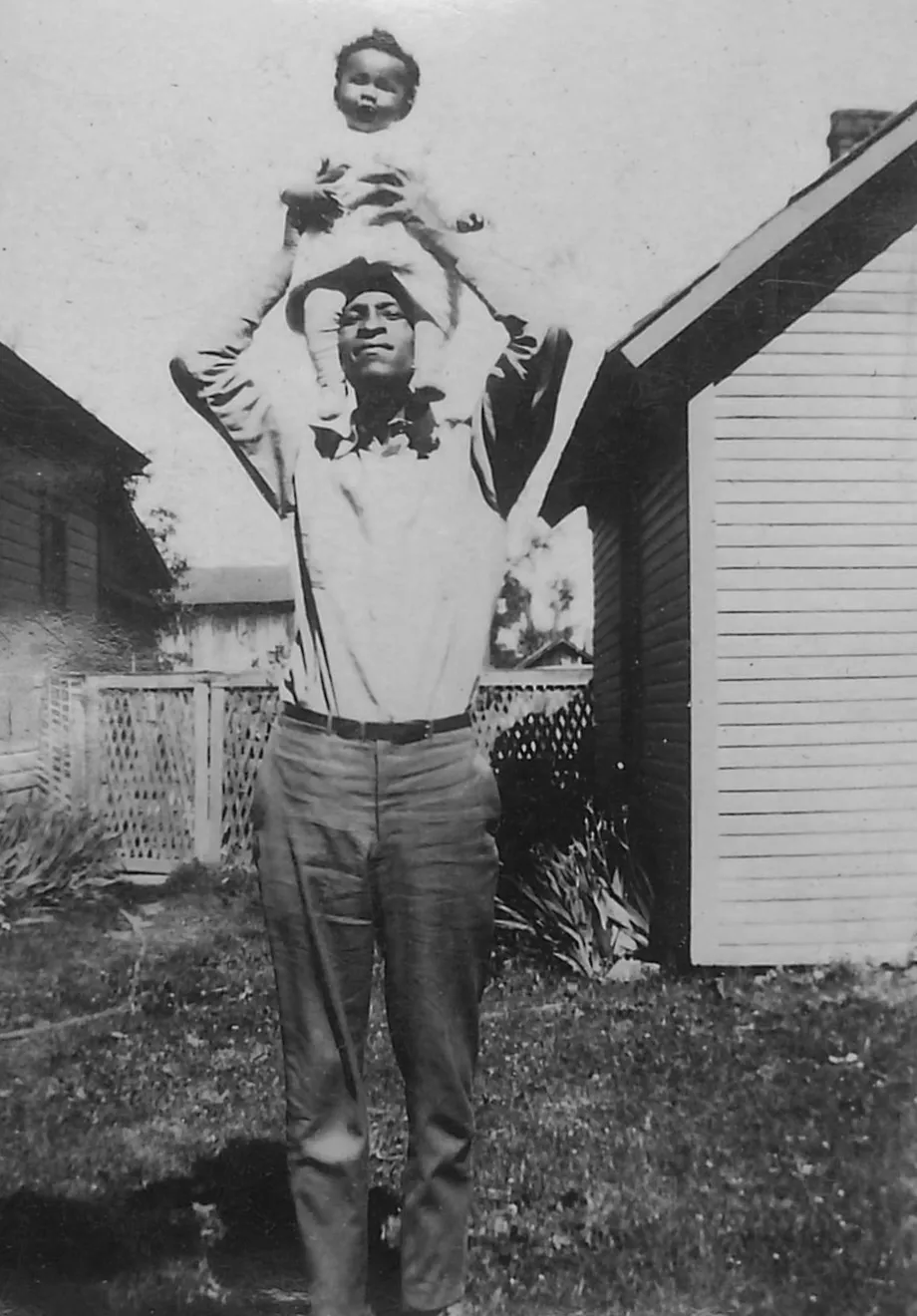
William Lyle holding baby Joyce over his head in June 1926. The house on the right was 310 N. Meldrum St. and on the left is 312 N. Meldrum St. The Lyle family lived in both homes during their time in Fort Collins. The 312 N. Meldrum St. bungalow still stands today.

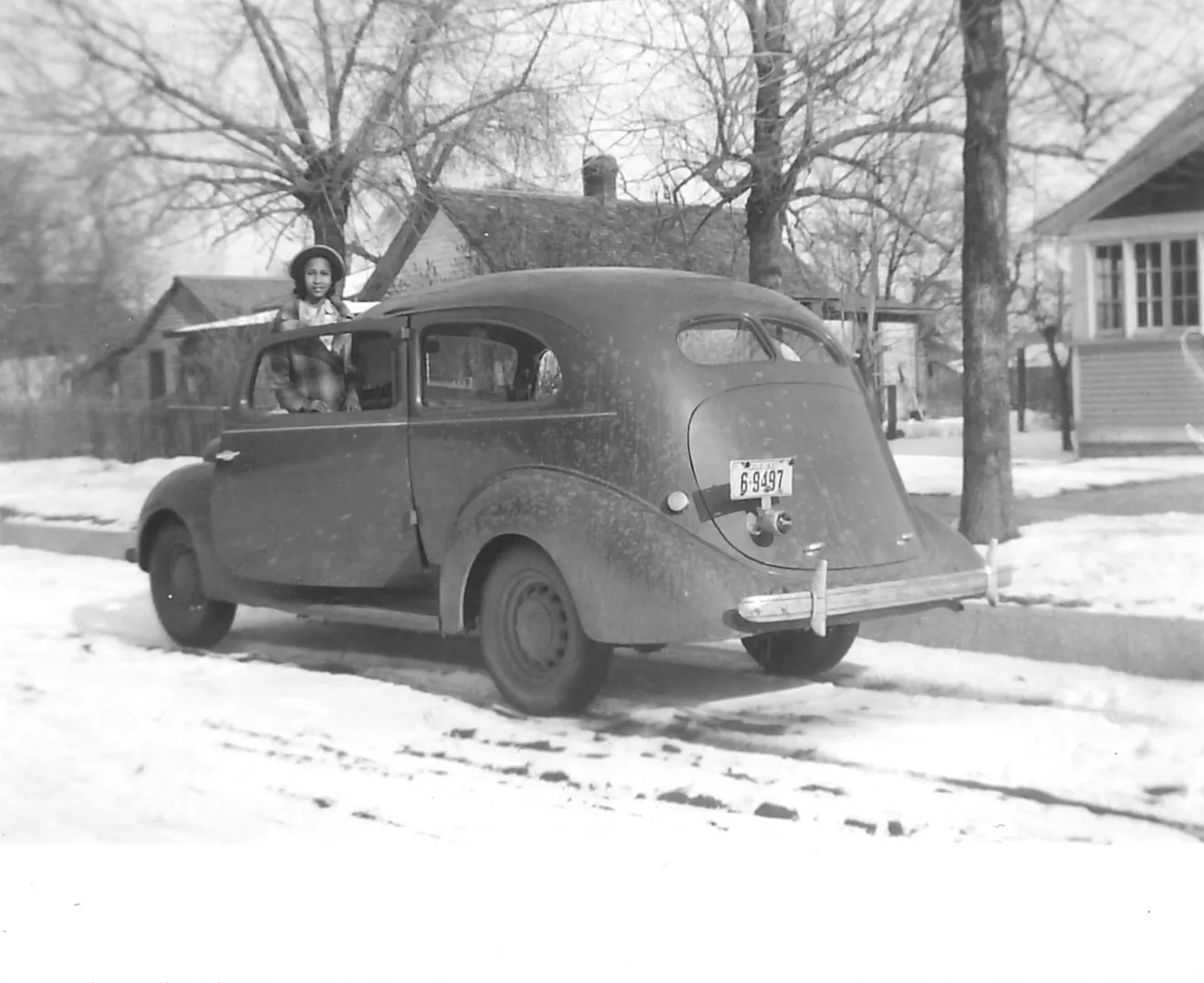
Joyce Lyle standing with the family's new car - a 1936 Hudson Terraplane - in November 1937. Their home, 312 N. Meldrum St., can be seen in the background.

William and Mattie Lyle moved to Fort Collins, Colorado in 1925. They moved into 310 N Meldrum St. Even though both her and her husband held teaching degrees, they worked in custodial services. In 1932, they moved next door, to 312 N Meldrum St.

== State Theater Case ==
In 1939, Mattie Lyle attended the State Theater (153 N College Avenue), which had opened in 1938, with her family. She was denied entrance into the facilities and sued the owner of the theater. She won with a unanimous decision by the jury and was awarded $500 in damages (~$11,000 today). She was the first person in Larimer County to sue on the basis of discrimination.

== Family legal connections ==
Mattie Lyle had numerous family connections to legal figures. Her great-uncle, Bird Gee, was a reconstruction-era civil rights activist. He sued a Kansas restaurant for denial of entrance into 1883. The case went to the United States Supreme Court, where it was one of the Civil Rights Cases of 1833. Bird Gee lost his case, because the Supreme Court ruled the Civil Rights Act of 1875 as unconstitutional, ruling that private businesses were free to racially discriminate.

Mattie Lyle's cousin Loren Miller was a well-known civil rights attorney who represented Hattie McDaniel and others in the 1945 "Sugar Hill" restrictive covenants lawsuit. Miller then served as chief counsel before the Supreme Court in the 1948 Shelly v. Kraemer decision that led to the outlawing of racially restrictive covenants nationwide. This case had local ramifications for the new Fort Collins subdivisions of Slade Acres and Circle Drive, which included racial covenants. However, by the time these events took place in 1948, the Lyles had moved to Seattle.

== Late life ==
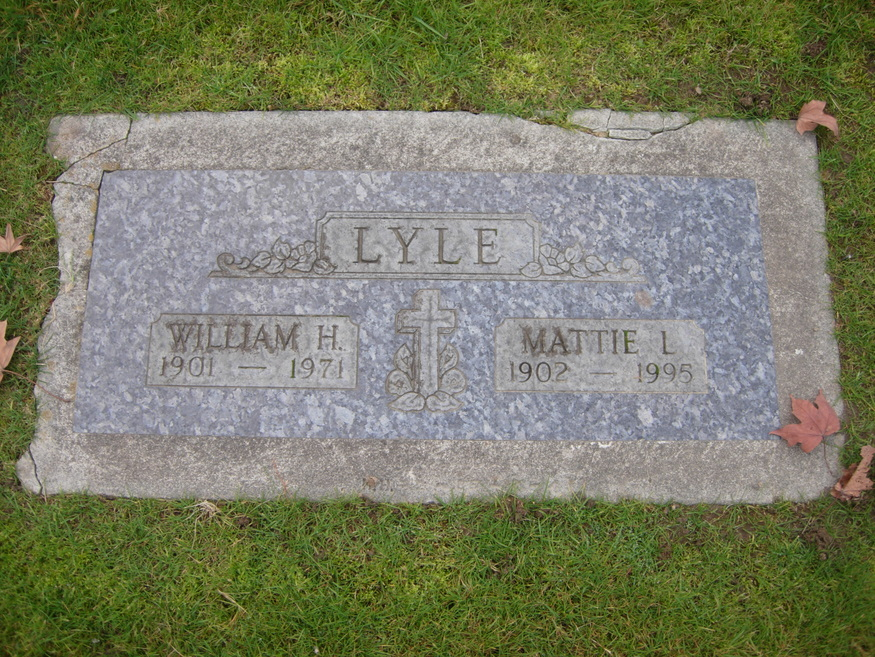
William and Mattie Lyle's grave in Evergreen-Washelli Memorial Park, Seattle, Washington

In 1944, Mattie and her family moved to Seattle, Washington where she lived for the rest of her life. She died April 9, 1995.
