= Louis W. Staudenmaier =

American lawyer, businessman, and politician

Louis William Staudenmaier (September 21, 1906 – October 12, 1980) was an American lawyer, businessman, and politician.

Born in Wathena, Kansas, Staudenmaier moved to Wisconsin in 1921 and went to Lourdes High School in Marinette, Wisconsin. He received his bachelor's degree from Marquette University and his law degree from Marquette Law School in 1933. He practiced law in Marinette, Wisconsin and was involved with the Stevenson National Bank and Trust in Marinette. From 1934 to 1936, Staudenmaier served in the Wisconsin State Assembly and was a Democrat. Staudenmaier died at his home in Marinette, Wisconsin.
