= Wathena (YTB-825) =

Tugboat of the United States Navy

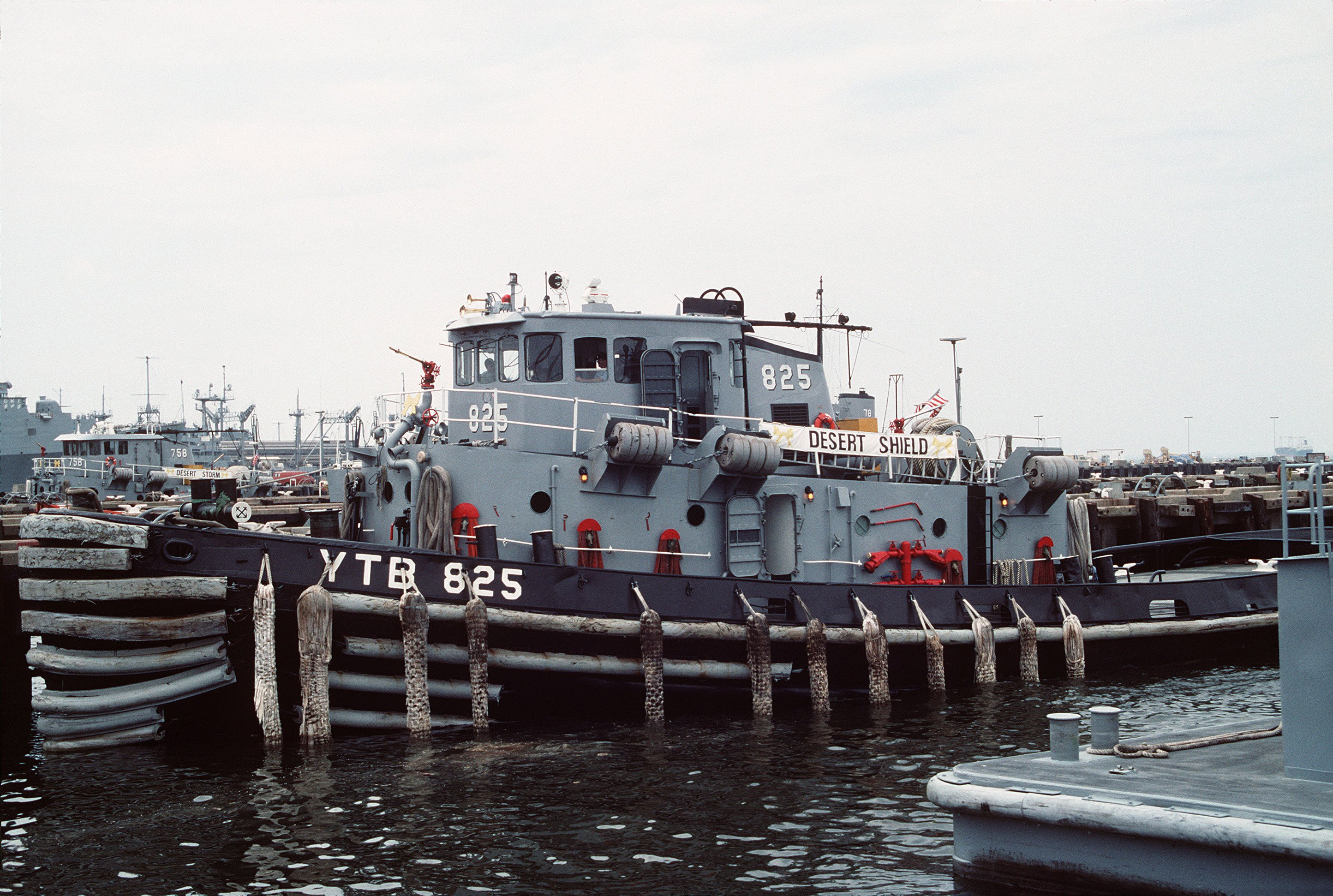
- Wathena (YTB-825) at Naval Station Norfolk, Virginia, on 28 March 1991

History

United States
- Namesake: Wathena, a Native American chief
- Awarded: 9 August 1971
- Builder: Marinette Marine Corporation, Marinette, Wisconsin
- Laid down: 4 April 1973
- Launched: 6 September 1973
- Acquired: 16 October 1973
- Stricken: 28 October 1997
- Identification: IMO number: 8972584; MMSI number: 367553370; Callsign: WDG6086
- Fate: Sold 17 May 2000

General characteristics
- Class & type: Natick-class large harbor tug
- Displacement: 286 long tons (291 t) (light); 346 long tons (352 t) (full)
- Length: 108 ft (33 m)
- Beam: 31 ft (9.4 m)
- Draft: 14 ft (4.3 m)
- Installed power: 2,000 hp (1,500 kW)
- Propulsion: one diesel engine, one screw
- Speed: 12 knots (22 km/h; 14 mph)
- Complement: 12

Wathena (YTB-825) was a United States Navy Natick-class large harbor tug named for Wathena, Kansas.

== Construction ==
The contract for Wathena was awarded 9 August 1971. She was laid down on 4 April 1973 at Marinette, Wisconsin, by Marinette Marine and launched 6 September 1973.

== Operational history ==
Placed in service soon thereafter at Norfolk, Virginia, in the 5th Naval District, Wathena provided assistance and towing services there until probably 1997.

Stricken from the Navy Directory 28 October 1997, Wathena was sold by the General Services Administration 17 May 2000. Renamed Patrick McAllister, ex-Wathena is in commercial service.
