= Albert Albers Barn =

- U.S. National Register of Historic Places
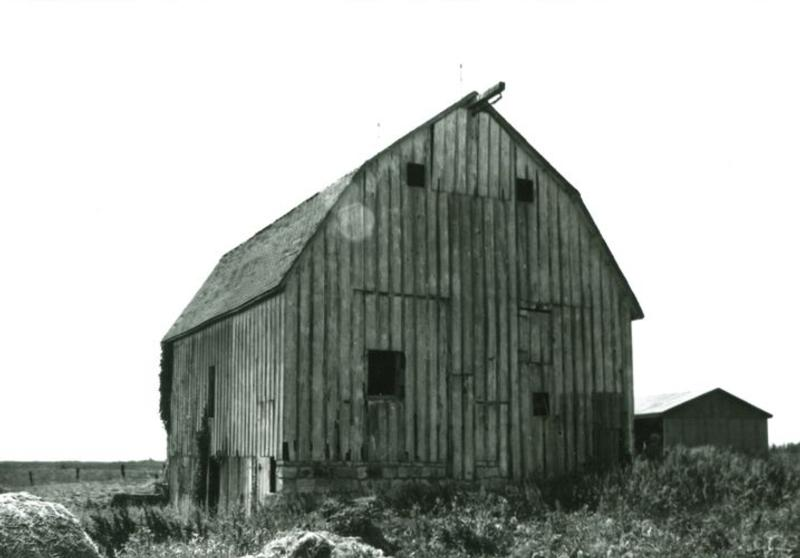
- Black and White photo of the Barn

- Location within Kansas Location within the United States
- Location: South of Bendena, Kansas
- Coordinates: 39°41′13″N 95°10′52″W
- Area: Less than one acre
- Built: c. 1897
- Architectural style: Full byre barn
- MPS: Byre and Bluff Barns of Doniphan County TR
- NRHP reference No.: 86003552
- Added to NRHP: May 7, 1987

Albert Albers Barn, in Doniphan County, Kansas, near Bendena, Kansas, was built in about 1897. It was listed on the National Register of Historic Places in 1987. It has also been known as Caudle Farms Barn.

It is a one-story, three-bay, side entrance, board and batten barn built on a limestone foundation. It is 30 by 36 feet (9.1 m × 11.0 m) in plan.
