= St. Benedict's Church (Bendena, Kansas) =

Historic church in Kansas, United States

- U.S. National Register of Historic Places
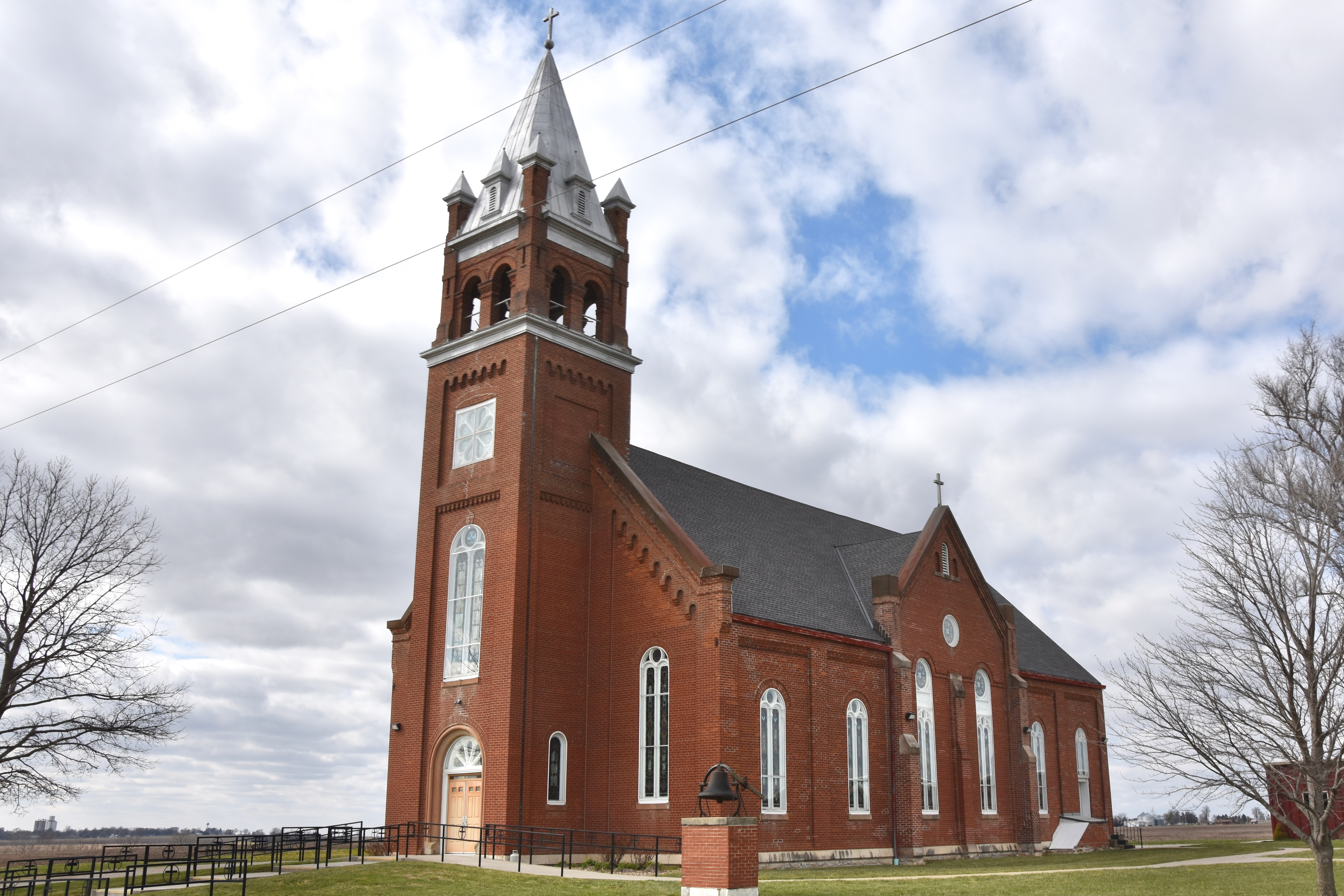
- St. Benedict's Church in 2026

- Location within Kansas Location within the United States
- Location: About 5 miles (8.0 km) southwest of Bendena, Kansas
- Coordinates: 39°43′08″N 95°13′52″W
- Area: less than one acre
- Built: 1903
- Architect: Joseph Waitz
- Architectural style: Gothic, Late Gothic Revival, Romanesque
- NRHP reference No.: 98000324
- Added to NRHP: April 9, 1998

St. Benedict's Church is a historic Roman Catholic church near Bendena, Kansas. It was built in 1903. The church was listed on the National Register of Historic Places in 1998.

It is a gable-fronted red brick building on a limestone block foundation, which was the foundation of the 1895 church which this replaced. It is 90 by 51 feet (27 m × 16 m) in plan and has a 101 feet (31 m) tower.
