= Highland Community College (Kansas) =

Public college in Highland, Kansas, US

- Former names: Highland Presbyterian Academy (1857); Highland University (1858–1910); Highland College (1910–1921); Highland Junior College (1921–29); Northeast Kansas Junior College (1929–37); Highland Public Junior College (1937–1959); Doniphan County Junior College (1959–65); Highland Community Junior College (1965–80)
- Type: Public community college
- Established: 1858
- President: Vincent Bowhay
- Students: 2,182 (fall 2023)
- Location: Highland, Kansas, United States; 39.8598525°N 95.2712458°W
- Campus: Rural
- Colors: Navy and gold
- Nickname: Scotties
- Mascot: Scottie
- Website: highlandcc.edu

Highland Community College (HCC) is a public community college in Highland, Kansas, United States.

== History ==
The college considers Highland University the precursor to Highland Community College, making it the first college in Kansas.

=== Founding ===
In November 1857 the Highland Presbytery was organized as part of the Missouri Synod and at the synods first meeting it was decided that a Presbyterian Academy would be established; By December the board had voted to establish Highland University in place of the academy to satisfy the founders' goal for highland to become an Educational and Religious center for the new territories. James Cambell acted as board president and Irvin acting as Secretary.

The Highland Town Company set aside four blocks on the western side of town for the college. The school was chartered by an act of the Kansas Territorial legislature, signed by Territorial Governor James W. Denver on February 9, 1858—making it one of the first three institutes of higher education incorporated in Kansas Territory, all of which were incorporated on that date.

=== 1858–1860 ===
James Cambell became headmaster of the college in 1858. Cambell Travelled back east to raise funds due to the campus' first building Irvin Hall going almost double the projected budget. Campbell was largely unsuccessful at obtaining funds and resigned in March 1859. Cambell was followed by two more headmasters in quick succession, but his board seat was filled by John Bayless for the next 10 years.

=== 1860–1865 ===
J.D. Paxton became headmaster in the fall of 1860. Women were permitted to attend classes at highland during this time but were supposed to be supervised by female instructors. Paxton wanted to expand the curriculum to include college courses that fall but his plans were squashed by the onset of the American Civil War. Most of the income of the college during the war was from the rent of the Mission's farm that was relinquished to the university. The war reduced student populations thus lowering Paxton's salary. Despite Paxton being permitted to live in Irvin Hall it wasn't enough causing his resignation in December 1861.

Samuel Irvin became headmaster from 1861 – 1863. Reverend H.P Johnson succeeded Irvin and founded the Highland Congregational Church. In 1864 the synod of Kansas was formed; the synod consisted of the Leavenworth, Topeka, and Highland Presbyteries. The university was handed over to the synod in 1865 believing that the support of the synod would grow the university.

=== 1865–1870 ===
Reverend William Bishiop was headmaster from 1864 to 1865 with Professor JC Mcelroy acting as headmaster until Samuel Irvin picked up the reins again for the 1866–67 school year. Academy classes were included in the 1865 curriculum but still no college courses. William T. Gage was headmaster from 1867 to 1870 and was relatively popular with one of his most prominent moves being the purchase of the school's bell.

John powers Johnson became the board of trustees' president in November 1869 following Bayless' return to his home state of New York. Johnson due to his large investment in the town of Highland (including the bank) knew that his livelihood rode on the success of the college. The Highland Presbyterian Mission was purchased by Johnson from the university in April 1868. Johnson Authorized the partial demolition of the mission (roughly 1/4) and then later authorized more resulting in the 40% of the building we see today.

Since the colleges inception until 1870 there was no dorms or eating facilities forcing students to find room and board in town. The first dorm on campus was completed around the same time as Johnson's ascension to presidency. This Dorm was a female dormitory and sits on the president day site of Culbertson Auditorium and was named for Sophie Rubeti. The second dormitory was called the square house, it sat on the corner of Prairie and Pennsylvania street. The square house was a boys' dorm and was constructed using the missions' building materials. The rest of the building materials were sold off to help ease the debt burden on the college despite the original plan of further campus expansion with them.

=== 1870–1875 ===
John A. Mcafee was hired as the college headmaster in 1870. Mcafee stressed Latin and Greek in his curriculum and had a desire to build a Christian college. Students under Mcafee were required to participate in chapel services each morning and attend church on Sunday. Mcafee however was bad in terms of finances believing that God would supply all his needs including financial ones. The college was still recognized by the Synod but was receiving no funds with solicitation efforts being largely unsuccessful. The first graduates from the university completed their degrees in 1872. The board of trustees had little faith in Mcafee's administration and was asked to resign by the board in 1874. Mcafee did retain his job as professor until he was let go in 1875. After Mcafee's departure he went on to found Park University where he died in its presidential position.

William C. Falconer replaced Mcafee in 1874 and was the first headmaster to have the presidential title. Non highland resident Presbyterians were dissatisfied with the amount of power the locals had on the synod school and was put up to a vote if the college should be moved to a more central location. The vote in 1874 to move the college failed with the majority sentiment being that the location was "the will of god". A drop in enrollment came after the 1874 grasshopper infestation shortly after his ascension and further put the college in debt. In 1875 Falconer resigned. His resignation was in large part due to the college being roughly 20k in debt by the fall of 1875.

Reverend Robert Cruikshank was named president and he, the students, faculty, and townspeople began fundraising. Samuel Irvin being one of the fundraisers went around Missouri, Iowa and Kansas with two Iowa Indians exchanging lectures from the Indians for monetary donations to the college. The fundraising under Cruikshank and the selling of college owned farmland allowed for the college to be debt free through his presidency. Elementary classes were discontinued at the college in the mid-1870s as a grade school was opened in Highland.

=== 1880–1885 ===
In 1882 Presbyterians once again demanded the college be moved to a more central location and then the synod voted to found College of Emporia. Emporia was chosen because the town had agreed to donate 38 acres and $35,000. After the founding of Emporia University many Presbyterians wanted to gut and liquidate Highland University to help support the newly founded university. The people of highland refused, and the board of trustees agreed to try and keep Highland universities doors open without the support of the synod. After the decision was made to keep the university open without the support of the synod it was determined that expenses would need to be cut to keep the college open. One of the expenses was Cruikshank's salary, after learning about the pay cut, he would have to endure he resigned and then found a teaching job at Emporia.

In 1882 H.D. McCarty was chosen as president. McCarty was known as one of the most known educators in Kansas as he was founder and president of the Kansas state teacher's association from 1870 to 1874 as well as the president of the shuttered Kansas state Concordia Normal School in 1875. Mcarty began teaching at Highland University in 1879 and acted as president from 1882 to 1885. During McCarty's presidency the university was very near bankruptcy without synod support. Financial support was hard to come by as it seemed as if everyone had lost faith in the floundering university. Staff during this time went months without pay and attendance plunged dropping from 19 college students and 88 academy students to 5 and 42 respectfully from the 81–85 years. The saving grace to this rocky financial situation was that the highland grade school was crowded. the overcrowded school allowed for the university to reintroduce elementary classes once again and get some financial relief in the form of tuition.

J.P Johnson the board of trustee's head resigned on commencement day 1885 along with H.D. Mcarty. Upon Johnson's resignation he offered $10,000 to the college if supporters could rally enough funds to match his donation. The new president, Duncan Brown, raised enough funds to match the donation securing the endowment fund of $20,000. Johnson stipulated that the funds must be used as an investment and that the interest be used to pay salaries or be given back to the donors.

=== 1885–1890 ===
In 1885 President Brown refused admission of George Washington Carver to Highland University on account of his skin color. Carver was accepted for the fall of 1885 semester as his grades were satisfactory but upon arrival he was greeted to "you didn't tell me you were a negro, Highland College does not take negroes". Carver was then forced to stay in Highland for months as he had no place to go nor any money as he had spent most of it getting to Highland. Carver worked in town and was tutored by former president McCarty who thought Highland should be more inclusive to all races. Carver then moved out of Highland and was accepted at a college outside of Highland and became one of the most famous black scientists in the U.S.

Brown resigned in 1888 to continue his missionary work. The Presbyterian church of highland building was built in 1888. After the church was built the Presbyterian chapel that resided inside Irvin Hall was removed and the building was renovated. Women residing in Rubeti hall during this time were permitted to walk and exercise after the school closed till teatime, after teatime women were to remain indoors for the rest of the night. Boys were to be off the streets by 8pm and was signaled by the ringing of the school bell, this rule however was seldom followed due to difficulty of enforcement. The first instance of a football game on campus occurred in 1889 by local players in highland against a Hiawatha team. In 1889 a campus newspaper was formed called The Nuncio and it published local and campus news as there was no town newspaper.

=== 1890–1895 ===
In 1890 J.P. Johnson offered another $10,000 on the same terms as the last one with the 1890 donation drive reaching $12,000 giving the endowment fund a total value of $42,000. Many of the donors including Johnsons were promissory notes where the donors promised to pay interest until the principal was turned over to the college. Those who discontinued their payment of interest on the promissory notes were sometimes taken to court where they would oftentimes win out on grounds of deception.

Professor Samuel Ensminger became president in 1892. in 1893 the college started collecting donations to build Eliza Irvin Hall after Samuel Irvin's wife. The hall was to be a girl's dormitory and music hall. The foundation was laid but it was never completed due to a recession and a fire destroying a portion of the business district thus hampering funding. The university fought the townspeople wanting to build a bigger grade school as they wanted to continue getting money from their elementary program. The new grade school was finished in December 1893 and the elementary program was discontinued on campus in the fall of 1894. The new grade school also cut into the universities academy program by covering the first two years of high schools well as the public-school providing education for free. Ensminger resigns in 1894 due to stagnant college growth. Rev W.D. Mcfarland became president in 1894 then asked to resign over lack of control over student body. William Boyle then followed in 1895.

=== 1895–1900 ===
Duncan McIntosh took over as board president in 1896. W.E. Lewis then replaced McIntosh as chairman in 1897 when McIntosh resigned over health reasons. Rev William Boyle is asked to resign in 1897 by the board for unknown reasons. Boyle then moved to New Mexico. Reverend Roy v. Magers became president in 1897 and then went on a fundraising trip along the east coast. The fundraising trip was a miserable failure to the extent that he resigned on his return from the trip and joined park college in 1900.

=== 1900–1905 ===
Ambrose P Hayden became president in 1900 but resigned in 1901 as he had a change of heart and started attending law school in Nebraska. Professor Amos Davis became president in 1901 and had a prosperous and assumedly quiet term at Highland. Lewis resigned from the board chair in 1903 after deciding to move to Oregon, he was replaced by Albert B. Irwin. Irwin's influence and connections with the Presbyterians got the college readopted by the synod once again in October 1905. In 1905 Davis demanded a 1k raise and that he could live in the presidential home for free. The board denied his request he then promptly resigned and moved to the Philippine islands as a missionary. Davis was replaced by George Knepper and had a focus on classroom expansion.

=== 1905–1910 ===
Highlands first formally organized football team was formed in 1905. The team was called the Orange Warriors due to their orange and blue team colors. The 1906 curriculum was altered reducing the number of semesters from three to two by Knepper. A boys' basketball team and girls' basketball team were organized in 1906. In October 1907, L.C McNair was hired and raised $20,000 in his fundraising efforts. This was used to build the administration building but was only enough to cover the building cost. The remaining cost lay in the furnishings of the building. The furnishing budget of 7.5k was administered to the college via a loan from the national college board of education of the Presbyterian church with 5% interest over a 3-year period.

The railroad arrived in Highland on May 5, 1908. It was thought that the arrival of the railroad and the readoption of the college by the synod would grow the college rapidly even without the synod contributing financially. W.M. Boone replaced Irwin the same year of the arrival of the railroad. The cornerstone laying ceremony of the administration building was held on June 1, 1909. The ceremony marked the end of Knepper's presidency with him the evening of. The admin building when completed was 82x90 feet. The building houses a small gym, janitor's room, boiler room, cloakroom, and two restrooms in the basement. The first floor contained three classrooms, a chemistry lab, a physics lab, president's office, and a 300-seat auditorium attached to the north side of the building. The second-floor houses five classrooms and a small museum. Sidewalks were also installed as well as park space north of the building.

William C. T. Adams replaced Klepper and was notorious for hiring people and spending money to solve issues. Highland University changed its name to Highland college in June 1910. The name change occurred mainly due to the size of the student body being of sub-university status in addition The Presbyterian College board also refused to loan the college money for the admin building furnishings without the name change. The board also insisted that the school becomes a standard college (modern accreditation college status) before requesting any more funding from them.

=== 1910–1915 ===
In order to become a standard college Adams expanded Highlands master's program and introduced a doctorate program. Adams even went so far as to award himself a doctorate in 1912. The gym in the basement of the admin building was remodeled to allow space for the newly created commerce (business) department. Normal training was reinstated for those seeking teaching certificates and Highlands normal school received accreditation from the Kansas state board of education in May 1912. Pre-high school academy courses were expanded to include "8th grade". By 1912 the amount of faculty had pretty much doubled to 17 teachers from 9 under the previous president. the baseball field north of campus was purchased by the city and furnished by community donations to make a proper field for the team in 1913. the college saw growth but not as much as anticipated spurring the need for more fundraising.

A.C. Brown was hired in 1913 to raise money for the dwindling endowment fund. A drought inhibited its performance however falling far short of the 200k goal. In October of the same year, the Highland Presbyterian Church burned further hurting the funding pool as it took funding priority. The following month of November saw the vote of the synod voting to once again oust Highland College. The synod decided to favor Emporia despite neither college being a standard college at this time. In the fall of 1913, the high school was updated from a 2-year high school to a four-year putting the final nail in the coffin of the academy at Highland College due to public high school being tuition free. Irvin Hall was rented to the high school for $1,750 a year due to space constraints. 1913 also spelled the end for the boys' basketball team because of Woodman Hall being burnt down.

Adams' expenses were double his predecessors in addition to the racking up interest of the admin building loan we're pushing the college further and further in debt. Despite the mounting debt Adams wanted to spend more but was eventually cut off by the board due to bankruptcy concerns. After the budget cut, Adams resigned on December 1, 1913. Professor W. Gilbert James was named president with large challenges at the opening gate. James was faced with 20k in debt and increasing interest on the loan in addition to a diminishing endowment fund.

Many community members felt the college should close in the fall of 1914 and sold to the high school, but the board and staff disagreed keeping the doors open. In June 1914 the Highland college lady's guild was organized to raise funds eventually achieving 7.5k in installments of 1.5k over the next 5 years to pay down the accumulated interest. Programs were also cut, and the student's numbers tumbled as they were cut because many dropped out after their programs had been cut. The tuition cost was the main driver in money lost as tuition had been seldom raised since the 1880s and James estimated that the college was losing around $75 per student. James increased the tuition cost by $75 and offered student work programs to reduce fees by 20 cents an hour. The work included cooking, cleaning, repairs and farming. A student who worked 2 hours a day could reduce their yearly cost to $125 or about $25 cheaper than the tuition pre-hike.

=== 1915–1920 ===
In 1916 the rules were changed from students being required to attend chapel services on all weekdays to only twice a week. Despite this change study hours began at 8 pm and lights out at 10:30. There were also rules banning liquor, tobacco, and profanity, and those who challenged or broke those rules risked dismissal from the college. Plants and livestock were in 1916 donated in hopes of student workers raising them in order for them to be sold to benefit the college. This plan was ruined by the US declaring war on Germany in April 1917. World War I Reduced the population of the student body due to the draft and obligations brought on by the war. There were 20 students attending Highland in the fall of 1917 reduced to 7 the following year as a result.

In August 1917, the Pullman Company donated an old sleeper car to be used as a boys' dorm because the square house was converted into staff housing in the 1890s and was burned to the ground a few years prior in 1911 leaving no boys dorm. The sleeper car had 10 upper berths and 10 lower berths. If 2 people slept in a bed the car could in theory hold 40 students but it's doubtful it held anything close to that during its tenure as a boys' dorm. It was placed in the lot south of Rubeti hall and was called the Pullman dorm and the Pecos by students. It was only used for one year. James resigned in June 1919 to become the dean at the University of Omaha. M.P. Smith took over in the summer of 1919 and the college at this time was nearly bankrupt. The student enrollment numbers were far worse than expected and doubt seeded even less financial support prompting Smith to resign in the fall of 1920.

=== 1920–1925 ===
In 1920, a committee was formed to oversee the closing of the campus but was convinced by the chairman of the closing committee to keep Highland running. His name was Ben Allen. The committee paid off almost all debts by liquidating the endowment fund with the only significant debt still remaining being the loan to the Presbyterian college board.

John Lynn Howe was hired as president and the fall of 1920. Howe was a missionary in Alaska until he caught Influenza and was forced to move to a warmer climate. The 1920 to 1921 school year was the last year of Highland being a four-year college. Mary Corbet Wickstrom was Highland's final bachelor's degree recipient. Howe and Allen attended a synod meeting in 1920. They were Hoping to regain support once again but were met with the recommendation for Highland to be closed, liquidated, and the funds given to Emporia. at the news of the rejection, many in the community thought it was time to close Highland doors because it had an outlived its usefulness. Howe's wife, however, was hopeful despite the bleak outlook and convinced howe to at least try to revive it.

In the fall of 1921, an agreement between Highland College and the University of Kansas was reached. The agreement entailed that students in Highland would take freshman and sophomore courses in Highland, but the classes would be under the direction of Kansas University. The credits would be recorded at both colleges, but the program only lasted until the fall of 1922. The Highlander student publication was first published in the fall of 1922. K.U. started accepting credits from Highland in November 1922, which helped aid it to accreditation status by the Kansas State Department of Education. The accreditation status allowed almost all of its credits to be universally transferable across the state. It was also around this time that Highland joined the American Association of junior colleges. The academy at Highland College officially closed in 1923 upon the completion of the public high school in Highland. The gym at the new high school was used to revive the boys' basketball team that previously hadn't played since 1913. The Trailblazer was another student publication that started in the fall of 1923. The girls' basketball team returned to Highland in 1925. Highland college's teams were called orange warriors or purple warriors depending on the uniform color and they were renamed the wildcats in 1925. Games were also never held on Sundays due to howe's religious beliefs.

The university building was renamed Irvin Hall and remodeled again in 1925. The second floor became a dining hall, and the first floor became a chem lab and a science classroom. The meals at the dining hall were kept cheap because community members frequently donated food items to the. On November 26, 1925, the administration building caught fire and the classes had to be moved to the basement of the Presbyterian Church. In December 1925, the national systems company (fundraising organization) was employed to raise $200,000 for a new dorm, a science hall, and a gym. The company publicized a fake news story of 75,000 being donated by Ben Allen's mother-in-law and as a result, people started giving large sums of money, but it all collapsed after it was leaked to be false. After this failure, the board fired the company and hired Orlando Bishop. Bishop was the local Baptist preacher and he set out on his fundraising journey by making 233 speeches calling for donations. By the time of his resignation in June 1927, he raised $11,000

=== 1925–1930 ===
Jere Kimmel became board chairman in 1924. In 1926, a $1 fine was implemented for people who cut too many classes. On New Year's Day in 1928, the president's home caught fire and he was forced to move. In the summer of 1928, howe decided college education needed to be more Christian and then banned frats, sororities, card playing, dancing, and modern jazz. Students were also required to sign a pledge to not drink, smoke, or use profanity. How also banned all Intercollegiate sports due to cost. He hoped that students would instead take up tennis, Croquet, Clock golf, Handball, and hiking. The banning of intercollegiate sports was originally denied by the board, but Howe convinced them. After the decision enrollment dropped, but it could also have been influenced by the depression. In 1929 the college was renamed Northeast Kansas Junior College as it was thought it would encourage enrollment and financial contribution by the surrounding communities.

=== 1930–1935 ===
On Saint Patrick's Day 1931 the admin building once again caught fire, leaving only the outer shell of brick. The building was not insured at least not fully with only 23,400 being covered out of the estimated 50,000 in damages. This caused uncertainty once again, but they eventually gained enough money and rebuilt the building in 1931. One of the major modifications was the roof was now flat as it was thought to save money. Also, in 1931 Cheney cottage was established as a dorm for girls with little funds. Cheney cottage was named after Lorinda Howe (Howes's wife) as Cheney was her maiden name. Housework and cooking were divided amongst the inhabitants of Cheney cottage. In 1932 how began renovating Rubeti hall himself. The chimney was built onto the hall from Stones brought in by alumni and friends of the college. How renovated the ground floor of Rubeti to house him and his family. Over 80% of students in 1932 couldn't afford to pay tuition due to the depression. Some students would work for the college to pay off debts and others brought food to keep the college running. The Highland College inn was established, and it exchanged food for tuition. During this time. Faculty often had to accept food instead of money but not all were satisfied. In 1935, a drought hit, and that in connection with the depression established another fear of closure by the fall of 1935. Howe then resigned and became secretary of the society of the friendless which is an organization that was dedicated to the welfare of released convicts.

=== 1935–1940 ===
C.M. Rankin succeeded howe in the summer of 1935. At the time of Rankin's Ascension, many of the faculty had resigned and were demanding for back pay. the endowment fund was almost non-existent, the board of education, and the University of Kansas dropped Highland's accreditation status. After becoming president, Rankin went off on a 3000 mi fundraising tour across the country to once again try to pay off Highland's debts. Rankin raised $3,200 but it was only enough to scrape by with six faculty members filing suit for unpaid salaries in racking up a $15,000 bill. In 1936, Cheney College was sold and the upper levels of Rubeti were remodeled for the girls dormitory. Rankin also closed the food service at Irvin over cost related issues. So, the only food options were a cafe downtown or a snack bar hosted by students for a fee.

In 1937, the college was forced to sell or mortgage all assets except the campus and the buildings to settle the debts to the teachers. In 1938 the school became a public college. Previously, state laws prevented the college from becoming public as it required that the local public high school be valued at a minimum of $15 million. Gerald Gordon (state representative and chairman on the board 1934–1936) and senator Ewigg Herbert introducing a special bill in 1936 that authorized a school district to be able to open a public junior college if the voters of the district agreed. Voters approved the proposition on September 6, 1936, in a special election winning in a 465 to 155 vote going into effect in the summer of 1937. After the law change Highland changes, its name from Northeast Kansas Junior College to Highland public Junior College. After the name change, Rankin was then called Dean instead of president and the college was brought under the control of the Highland high School Board.

The law also required that Doniphan Atchison and Brown County provide tuition to the college to allow its residents to attend tuition free. Brown county refused to pay and argued the bill is unconstitutional. The trial was brought to court and the case was ruled in Highland's favor, but Brown County still withheld its funds. Highlands still owed $5,750 out of the 7,500 originally owed to the national board of Christian education of the Presbyterian Church., 94 Students were still required to attend convocations held every other week.

Girls living in Rubeti were allowed to leave their dorm twice a week but had to be back before 11:00 p.m. or at midnight on Fridays and Saturdays. In 1937 the basketball team was organized marking the first intercollegiate sports organized in over a decade and This was also the first year the athletic teams began calling themselves the Scotties. This team was disbanded just a few years later in 1943 due to lack of men in World War II.

=== 1940–1945 ===
Most popular programs during this time period was the teaching program that allowed an elementary teaching certificate in one year as it was a work experience program. The medical program also required experience working at Highland hospital. In 1942 the college finally came to an agreement to fight pay $500 a year between the years of 1948 and 1958 to pay off the rest of the interest on its debt to the presbyterian college board. In 1943 there was only one male student on campus due to the draft which spelled the death of intercollegiate sports once again on campus. Rubeti Hall was closed in 1943 as a cost saving measure as well as keeping the teacher wages low. the case of brown county withholding its tuition funds from Highland was brought to the supreme court on January 25, 1944, and it finally allowed to for both Brown and Atchison counties to get out of the agreement. The high school board had three members, with Ben Allen taking the role of treasurer in 1944. Rankin resigned in April 1944 due to low budget instead becoming a superintendent in McLouth, Kansas. Ruth Culberson became dean and was the first woman in that position. Over her five-year tenure $13,500 was donated yet no buildings were constructed under her.

=== 1945–1950 ===
Under Culberson all classes were held in the admin building and Irvin was used as a storage structure. She was house mother at Rubeti, males lived off campus and no cafeteria service were provided to students. Culberson often put some of her salary back into college as she had other means of income. Culbertson also introduced summer and night school to Highland. The Highlander and Trailblazer were discontinued during this period. Basketball was reformed in 1946. Culbertson resigned in 1948. in 1949 a bill was passed sponsored by senator Ben Allen; The bill was similar to the one passed in 1936 but wasn't contested. The Highland newspaper (Highlander) was revived in 1949 In the summer of 1949 Howard Seaman becomes dean.

=== 1950–1955 ===
Football was revived in 1950 to Attract more male students and focus was shifted to highlight intercollegiate sports. On April 30, 1953, Highland School district voted to spend $80,000 on a field house to be used by both the college and the high school. Ben Allen was the treasurer of the school board and also the contractor for the building. Hence the budget of $80,000. Inflation and changes ended up ballooning the cost to $103,000 and to save money; The wood was sourced from the trestles of the abandoned rail between Highland and Severance, Kansas. Some money was recovered through donations but much of it was paid for by Allen. In 1954, permission was given to build a motel on the lot South of Rubeti. The motel acted as student housing during the school year in a commercial hotel in the summer. The building was for males but primarily for male athletes. Other construction around campus was a garage constructed north of Rubeti for Seamans car and a new roof placed on Irvin. In 1954, the first floor of Irvin was cleaned and wired for electricity. The first floor was also decorated to be used as a Students' union. In February 1955 the gym was dedicated to Alan and was named Allen fieldhouse (not Allen Fieldhouse). The field house contained a regulation basketball court with seating for 1,200 people, addressing room under the west stands and a kitchen under the east.

=== 1955–1960 ===
In 1955, the Kansas legislature ended the 60-hour certificates causing the 2-year highland certificates to not be sufficient and sinking a popular program. Stephen Byham replaced seamen in 1955 but died on November 18, 1956, after being diagnosed with double pneumonia caused by injury during the Battle of the Bulge. Dale Kessinger became dean for the rest of the school year. In 1957 Jack Flint became Dean. In November 1958, Doniphan County voted to support the college by way of a Mill levy. The college was then named Doniphan County Junior College in 1959 due to legal requirements. The Dean title was then changed back to president and the school board was resurrected with William Twombly becoming chairman. In 1959, the library was moved from the admin building to the upper level of Irvin. 116. Rubeti Hall was the only dormitory on campus and only held 20 girls. An unofficial dormitory called Parker Hall consisted of a few rooms above the post office that used to stand across the street from Allen fieldhouse was the only other housing besides the motel. In 1959, the land between the baseball field and Irvin was leveled and made into a football field with a quarter mile track circling it. Bleachers were built into the south side of the stadium along the hill.

=== 1960–1965 ===
In 1960 Highland Began offering classes at the Barracks in Fort Leavenworth with standard liberal arts courses and more refined trades. In 1962, Flint purchased a home in town. In 1964 Robert Corders office building was purchased for $20,000 and remodeled into a girl's dormitory to house 36 girls. The building was done remodeled in 1965 which boosted the capacity to 76. Rubeti was converted to a boys' dorm after the purchase. Flint resigned to become the president of Kansas City Kansas Community College in 1965. Upon his departure Flint sold his home to the college making it the official highland presidents' home.

=== 1965–1970 ===
In the summer of 1965 Tony Woodrum was hired as president. 1965 was also the same year that the Kansas legislator reorganized the junior college system throughout the state. the reorganization caused the school to change its name from Doniphan County Junior college to Highland community junior college despite still being owned by the county. The new law didn't stop at the name change however, the new law required that all students pay tuition and allowed for the college to charge more money for out of state tuition. Enrollment also increased during this period as draft deferrals were being offered to students during the Vietnam War draft. In 1966 the Library-Student Union building was completed. the building was funded with revenue bonds and a grant for $111,000 from the United States Office of Education resulting in a grand total of $233,914. The Highland Alumni Association was reorganized in March 1969. The north central accreditation team visited campus in 1969 but couldn't recommend the campus for accreditation due to financial problems and poor facilities.

=== 1970–1975 ===
A large dorm and cafeteria were then planned for $575,000 but a proposition to increase the county tax to fund it failed resulting in a more conservative plan of a small dorm with no cafeteria. The new plan cost $434,735 covered by $340,000 in sold revenue bonds and the rest being covered by the United States office of housing and urban development removing the need for additional tax money. In 1971 the college purchased the old highland Baptist church for $600 and was used to hold the Head Start (program). in November 1972 the Endowment fund was resurrected. Upward Bound set up and office on campus in 1973 until eventually leaving in 1981. During the same period Highland started hosting and administering G.E.D. testing.

In 1974 female students protested restricted dormitory hours for female students living on campus in the dorms. The female students cited discriminatory practices as their reason for protest and the endeavor was successful for abolishing dormitory hours for female students.

In fall 1974 Highland began offering classes in neighboring communities in the evenings and began allowing high school students to take courses for college credit while still in high school. Highland was assigned to offer extension courses in Atchison, Brown, Doniphan, Jackson, Jefferson, Marshell, Nemaha, and Eastern Pottawatomie Counties. Highland also offered inmates at United States Penitentiary in Leavenworth but the program was discontinued after a lack of funding in 1978.

=== 1975–1980 ===
Highland high school burnt down in August 1975 and after the new one was built Allen Field House was sold to the college for $32,000. Also in August 1975 President Woodrum resigned and Jack Nutt was hired. Chairman Twombly is replaced by Robert Peeler in 1975 as well. Nutts first goal as president is achieving national accreditation status through North Central Association of Colleges and Schools. After the poor evaluation in 1969 improvements were made and highland achieved accreditation status for 5 years in 1977 allowing for highland credits to be transferred nationwide. In the fall of 1975 highland began introducing many vocational courses including Agribusiness, Office work, Emergency medical, and justice programs. In 1976 Highland entered a partnership with the Atchison vocational school allowing a dual enrollment and significantly expanded the variety of vocational programs under Highland.

In January 1977 Yost Hall was constructed for $144,995 with the top floor being occupied by the agri-business department and the bottom floor being occupied by the art department. The building was named for Walter Yost a well-known Kansas artist that taught at highland for many years. In 1979 the college asked for $850,000 from the county after being rejected for the original asking price of $1.2 million 3 times over. The reduced asking price was passed on a slim margin. The money from the county plus the $340,000 from former president Ruth Culbertsons will was used to construct the Math science building with connected auditorium. The Math science building was named after then President Jack D. Nutt and the Auditorium after Culbertson. Before the construction on the new facility was started the 110-year-old Rubeti hall and the college motel had to be demolished to make room. Bricks from the fireplace of Rubeti were used for a memorial outside Allen fieldhouse as a tribute to Sophie Rubeti. Due to inflated gas prices highland saw an influx of students wanting to stay on campus and as a short-term solution they installed mobile homes in the north of town.

=== 1980–1982 ===
In 1980 the Kansas legislature decided to drop the "junior"from the names of the state's community colleges. The name of the school became Highland Community College.[154] A more permanent solution to the influx of campus bound students arrived in the form of two brick dorms. Financing for the dorms came from the Federal Farm and Home Administration and was to be paid back with student rent. The two dorms opened in spring of 1981 with Heritage Hall housing male students and the new Rubeti Hall housing female students. Highland was again given full accreditation for 7 years in 1982. Under Nutt, Irvin Hall, The Administration Building, and Allen Field House underwent major renovations. In the summer of 1982, Nutt resigned to become president of Lincoln College (Illinois) and was replaced by Bill Spencer.

== Campus ==
The college's campus includes several historical buildings:

- Irvin Hall – First permanent building at Highland Community College
- Rubeti Memorial – Named for Sophie Rubeti a young Sac Indian girl who fatally died of Tuberculosis shortly after her eighteenth birthday. Sophie instructed that half of her $200 savings would go to the college and the other half to "teach little children to follow Christ." The bricks of the monument are from the fireplace of the former Rubeti Lodge

== Notable alumni ==
- Tay Glover-Wright, professional football player
- Marvin Jones (born 1993), professional basketball player
- Robert Jones, professional football player
- Brandon King (born 1993), professional football player

== See also ==
- List of colleges and universities in the United States
- Irvin Hall, the first building on campus, listed on the National Register of Historic Places
