= Highland Christian Church =

Historic church in Kansas, United States

- U.S. National Register of Historic Places
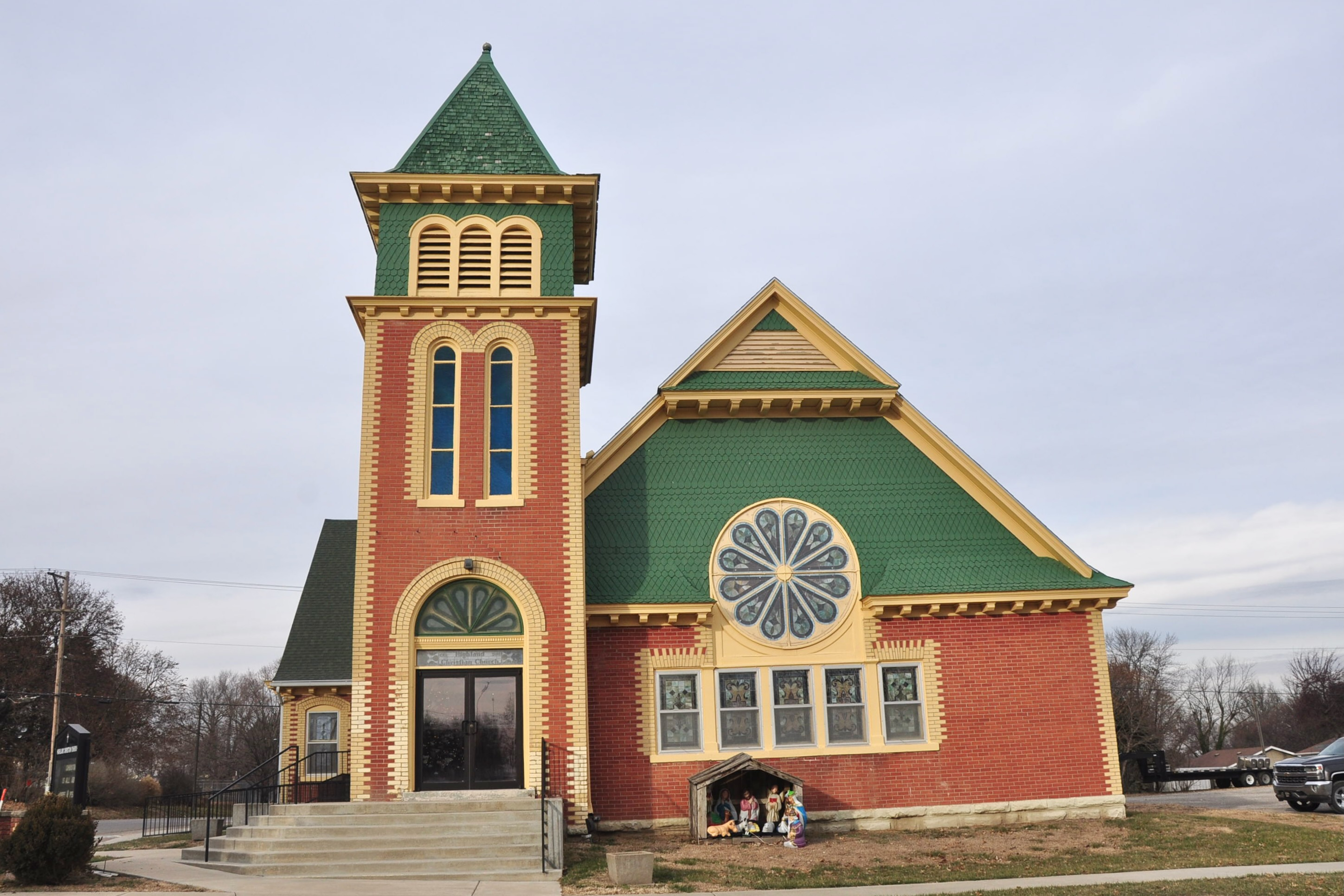

- Location within Kansas Location within the United States
- Location: 102 E. Main St., Highland, Kansas
- Coordinates: 39°51′35″N 95°15′53″W
- Area: less than one acre
- Built: 1904
- Built by: Saunders, Ely; Honeywell,
- Architectural style: Shingle Style
- MPS: Highland, Doniphan County, Kansas MPS
- NRHP reference No.: 07000250
- Added to NRHP: April 4, 2007

The Highland Christian Church is a historic church at 102 E. Main Street in Highland, Kansas. It was built in 1904 and added to the National Register in 2007.

It is a two-story building, veneered with red brick on its first story. Buff brick is used at windows and as quoins at corners. It has a three-story square steeple. It was deemed "significant as an example of the Shingle Style adapted to a church building" and "because prominent local builder Ely Saunders oversaw both phases of construction."
