= Irvin Hall =

- Irvin Hall, Highland Community Junior College
- U.S. National Register of Historic Places
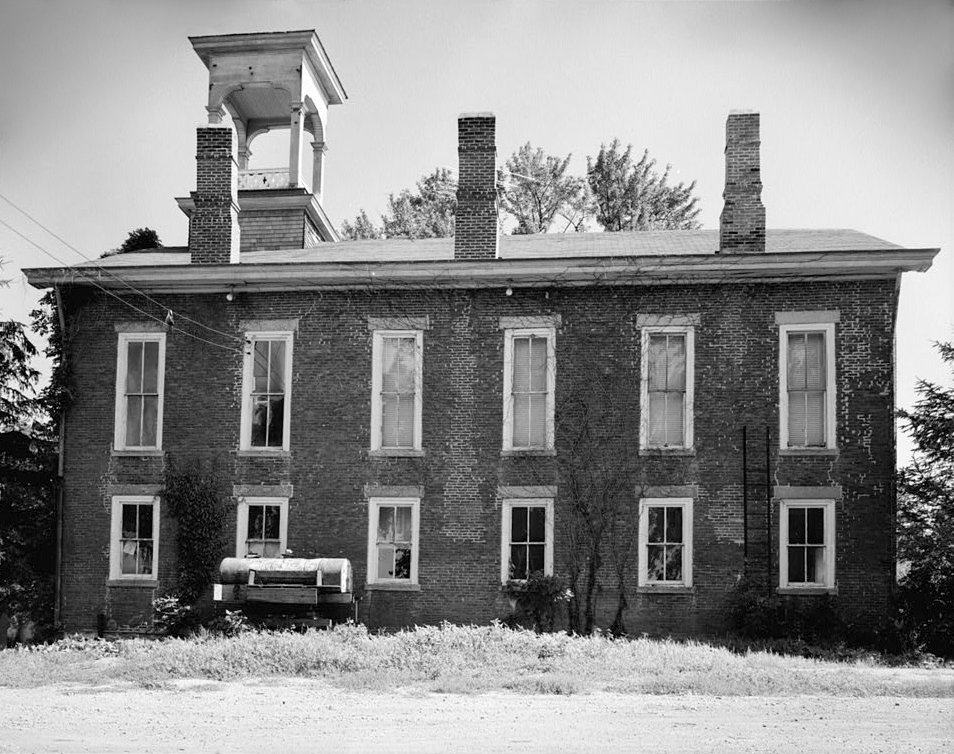
- Irvin Hall in 1958

- Location within Kansas Location within the United States
- Location: Highland Community Junior College campus, Highland, Kansas
- Coordinates: 39°51′36″N 95°16′13″W
- Area: less than one acre
- Built: 1859
- Architectural style: Plains Vernacular
- NRHP reference No.: 71000307
- Added to NRHP: February 24, 1971

Irvin Hall was the first permanent building at Highland University in Highland, Kansas. It is the oldest building in Kansas still used for higher education.

== Planning ==
The Highland Town Company offered to give the university forty-eight additional lots and a sum of $1,200 if the board of trustees would construct a building within a three-year time span at a cost of greater than or equal value of $6,000. Samuel Irvin's plan was for the university to sell the lots at $100 per lot to get $4,800 in addition to the $1,200 provided by the company to cover the cost of the building. The building committee designed an enormous structure of four stories in the center and three stories on the wings of the building. The planned structure was to be 180 feet by 40 feet. The Bricks of the building were sourced from the old gates farm just north of highland and lumber was sourced from St. Joseph, Missouri and Doniphan, Kansas.

== Groundbreaking ==
The Corner Stone for Irvin Hall was laid on May 11, 1858, accompanied by speeches by local leaders. One of Highland University's founders Samuel Irvin said at the laying of the cornerstone that only a few years had passed that "savage Indians" had roamed the area. he also added in his speech "now with the laying of the cornerstone civilization and education have taken the place of savagery and debauchery... he saw no reason why a Harvard or Yale College should not be built here..."

The first floor of what was supposed to be the east wing of building was completed as a one-story classroom building in 1858 in time for the school year that fall. The second floor was not finished until 1860. The rest of building was never completed as a due to lack of funds. The total cost ended up being almost double the original plan at $10,000. The Overspending on the hall put the college in debt and while it was the first financial burden on the college it certainly wouldn't be the last.

== The University Building ==
The two-story red brick building is described as an excellent example of the Plains Vernacular style. The facade uses flat stone lintels over the windows and doors, with pilasters and a brickwork pattern on two side. The other elevations are plain in character. A flat-topped wood frame bell tower is situated on the east end.

On the ground floor the university building had two 20x40 foot classrooms, two recitation rooms, apparatus room, library and an entrance hall. On the second floor that was completed in 1860 was a 40x40 foot chapel that was used by the Highland Presbyterian Church for worship until 1888.

== Iterations post 1900 ==
Irvin Hall was rented to highland high school in 1913 for 1,750 dollars a year due to size constraints imposed by the expansion of the high school curriculum from 2 to 4 years. This agreement was ended in 1923 when the new high school was finished.

The university building was officially renamed Irvin Hall in 1925 named for Rev. Samuel M. Irvin, a missionary at the Iowa and Sac & Fox Mission State Historic Site and a founder of Highland Community College (Kansas). Irvin Hall was also renovated again in 1925 changing the floorplan to have a dining hall on the second floor, and a chem lab and a science classroom on the first.

1944-1954 Irvin was primarily used as a storage structure and the roof was allowed to degrade. The roof was replaced in 1954 and the building was electrified. The first floor was decorated to become a student union. during the renovation there wasn't enough paint to cover all the walls of the north room in the building resulting in each wall being painted a different color giving it the name of "the rainbow room".

in 1959 the library was moved from the administration building to Irvin's upper level.

After the construction of the new library building in 1966 students formed a human chain from Irvin Hall to the new library passing each book one by one down the chain. Irvin hall was again remodeled with the arts and crafts classes being moved to Irvin's ground floor and the music department being moved up to its second floor.

Around the mid 1970s Irvin was extensively renovated with the first floor of Irvin being converted into a G.E.D. and developmental reading program classroom. The second floor being remodeled and converted into offices for the coaching staff.

The present-day interior has been extensively altered since the building's completion in 1860.

Irvin Hall was placed on the National Register of Historic Places on February 24, 1971.
