= Highland University =

Former university in Highland, Kansas

Highland University (sometimes called "Highland College") was an institution of higher learning located in Highland, Kansas, United States. It was established for the Sac and Fox Nation under the Presbyterian church. Origins of the school date back to 1837. Highland Community College claims that its roots date back to this university, and that this makes it the "first college in Kansas."

In the late 19th century, the noted scientist, botanist, educator, and inventor George Washington Carver was accepted at Highland College. When he arrived, however, they refused to let him attend because of his race.
