= Highland Presbyterian Church =

Historic church in Kansas, United States

- U.S. National Register of Historic Places
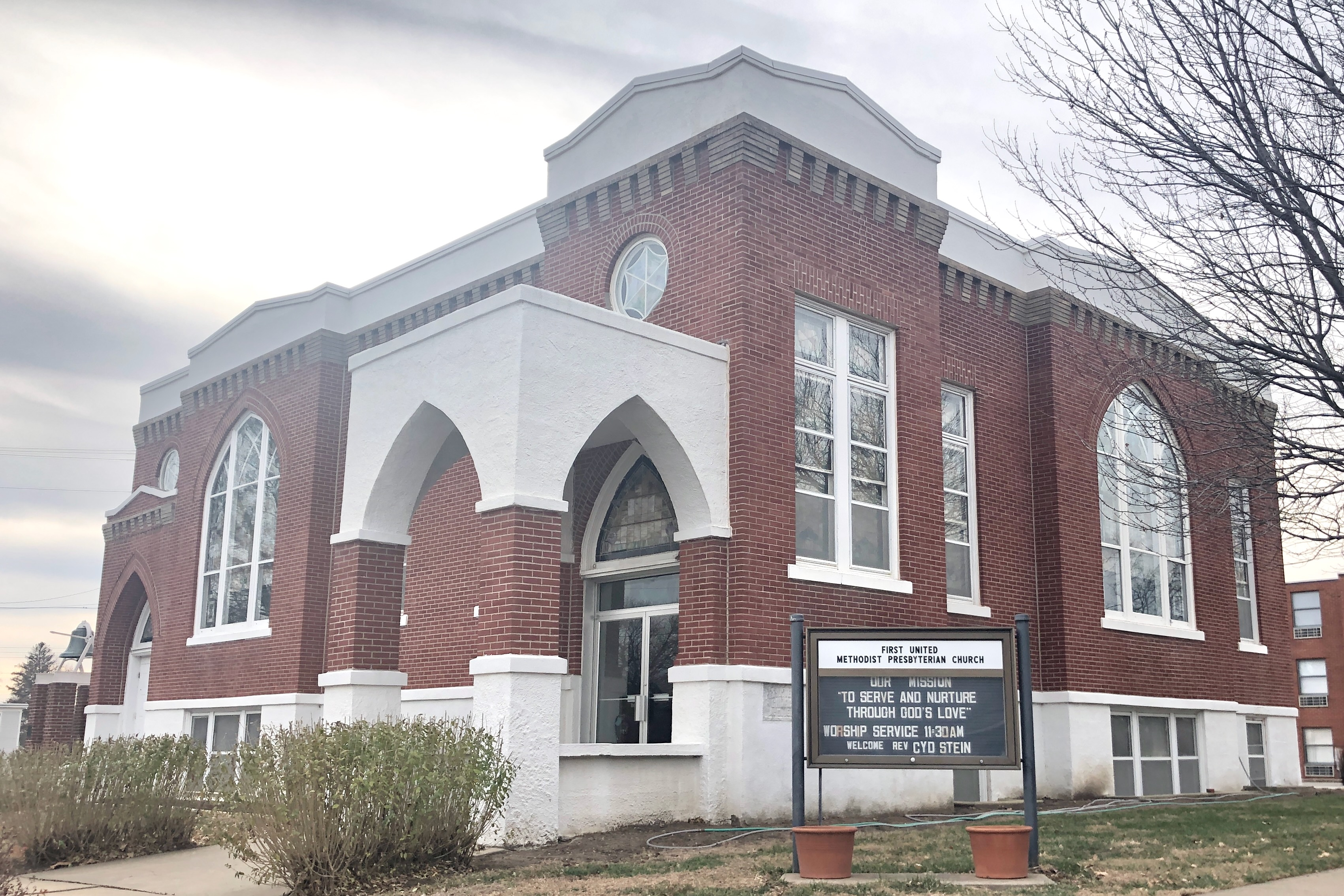

- Location within Kansas Location within the United States
- Location: 101 South Ave., Highland, Kansas
- Coordinates: 39°51′34″N 95°16′15″W
- Area: less than one acre
- Built: 1914
- Architect: Chandler, R.B.
- Architectural style: Collegiate Gothic
- MPS: Highland, Doniphan County, Kansas MPS
- NRHP reference No.: 07000248
- Added to NRHP: April 4, 2007

The Highland Presbyterian Church in Highland, Kansas, also known as the Highland United Methodist-Presbyterian Church, is a historic church listed on the National Register of Historic Places in 2007. It is located at 101 South Avenue in Highland. It was built in 1914.

It is a 52 by 64 feet (16 m × 20 m)-plan one-story brick church. It was deemed "significant as a vernacular example of the Collegiate Gothic style and local construction." After the church'2 1888 original building was destroyed by a fire, the new church was designed by church member R.B. Chandler, who was not an architect but sought to save money for the church. He also oversaw construction.
