= USS Wathena (ID-3884) =

Cargo ship of the United States Navy

History

United States
- Name: USS Wathena
- Namesake: Wathena, a Kickapoo chief
- Builder: Merchant Shipbuilding Corporation, Bristol, Pennsylvania
- Launched: 11 September 1918
- Completed: 1918
- Acquired: 1 February 1919
- Commissioned: 1 February 1919
- Decommissioned: 10 April 1919
- Stricken: 10 April 1919
- Fate: Returned to United States Shipping Board, 10 April 1919; abandoned due to age and deterioration 1933
- Notes: In Shipping Board custody as SS Wathena 1918 and 1919-1933.

General characteristics
- Type: Design 1025 ship
- Displacement: 12,225 tons
- Length: 417 ft 9.5 in (127.343 m)
- Beam: 54 ft 0 in (16.46 m)
- Draft: 25 ft 6 in (7.77 m)
- Depth: 32 ft 9 in (9.98 m)
- Propulsion: Steam, one screw
- Speed: 11 knots
- Complement: 70
- Armament: none

The first USS Wathena (ID-3884) was a United States Navy cargo ship in commission in 1919.

Wathena was a steel-hulled, single-screw freighter built for the United States Shipping Board in 1918 at Bristol, Pennsylvania, by the Merchant Shipbuilding Corporation. She was taken over by the U.S. Navy on 1 February 1919 for operation by the Naval Overseas Transportation Service (NOTS). Assigned Identification Number (Id. No.) 3884, she was placed in commission at Philadelphia, Pennsylvania, on the same day.

Wathena conducted only one round-trip voyage for NOTS. Her holds loaded with 5,754 tons of cargo, she departed Philadelphia on 13 February 1919, bound for the British Isles. After arriving at London, England, on 1 March 1919, she discharged her cargo in the ensuing days, underwent voyage repairs, and departed on 17 March 1919 to return to the United States.

Wathena arrived back at Philadelphia on 3 April 1919 and was placed in line for demobilization soon thereafter. Decommissioned and struck from the Navy List on 10 April 1919, Wathena was simultaneously turned over to the United States Shipping Board.

Wathena remained in the ownership of the Shipping Board through the 1920s. Eventually laid up, she deteriorated so much that she was abandoned in 1933 due to "age and deterioration."
