= St. Mary's Catholic Church (Purcell, Kansas) =

Historic church in Kansas, United States

- U.S. National Register of Historic Places
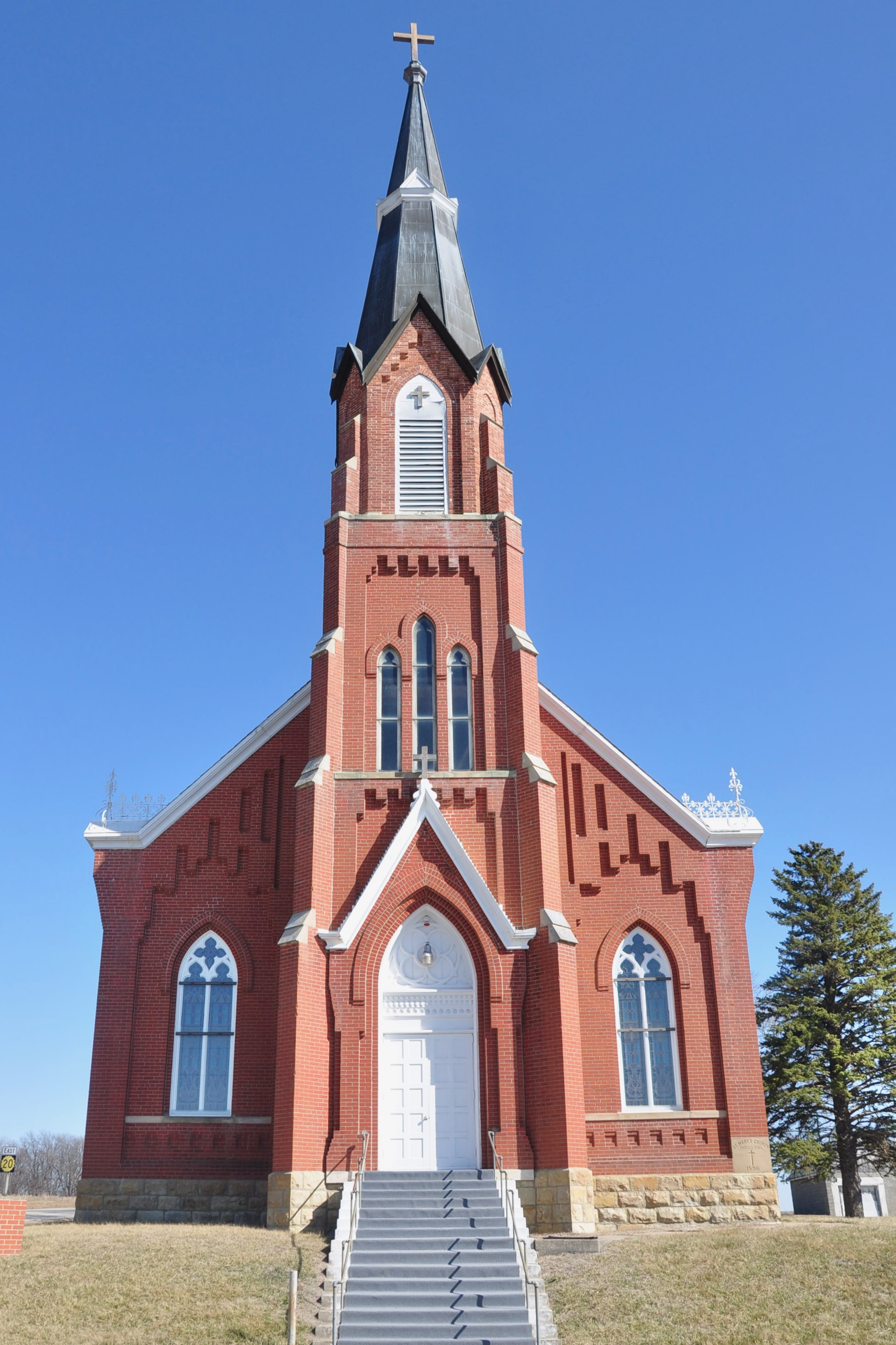
- St. Mary's Church in 2024

- Location within Kansas Location within the United States
- Location: 446 KS 137, Purcell, Kansas
- Coordinates: 39°40′54″N 95°19′49″W
- Area: 3 acres (1.2 ha)
- Built: 1896
- Built by: Mathias Schnell
- Architect: J.H. Bennet
- Architectural style: Late Gothic Revival
- NRHP reference No.: 01000413
- Added to NRHP: April 25, 2001

The St. Mary's Catholic Church in Purcell, Kansas, is a historic Roman Catholic church which was built in 1896. The church is listed on the National Register of Historic Places.

It is a red brick Late Gothic Revival-style church with a central tower having a bell and a steeple; the steeple rises to 112 feet (34 m).

It is located at the intersection of Highways 20 and 137, on the path of the original Pony Express trail from St. Joseph, Missouri to Sacramento, California.
