= Purcell, Kansas =

Unincorporated community in Doniphan County, Kansas

- Unincorporated community
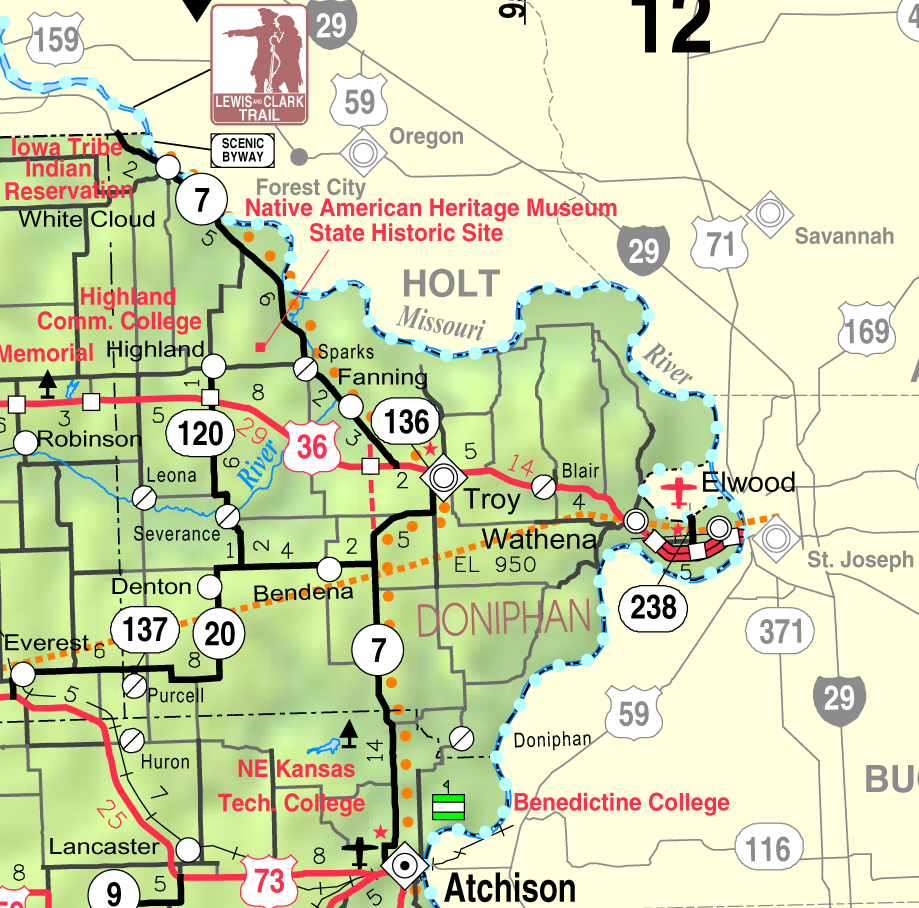
- KDOT map of Doniphan County (legend)

- Location within Kansas Location within the United States
- Coordinates: 39°40′50″N 95°19′51″W
- Country: United States
- State: Kansas
- County: Doniphan
- Founded: 1886
- Named for: John Purcell
- Elevation: 1,139 ft (347 m)
- Time zone: UTC-6 (CST)
  - Summer (DST): UTC-5 (CDT)
- Area code: 785
- FIPS code: 20-57950
- GNIS ID: 473266

Purcell is an unincorporated community in Doniphan County, Kansas, United States. It is located 5 miles (8.0 km) east of Everest, south of K-20, on highway K-137.

== History ==
Purcell was founded about 1886. John Purcell was one of the earliest settlers.

A post office was opened in Purcell in 1887, and remained in operation until it was discontinued in 1956.

St. Mary's Catholic Church, which is listed on the National Register of Historic Places, is located in Purcell.
