= Wathena (chief) =

Wathena (pronounced Wah-The-Nah) was a Native American chief of the Kickapoo tribe. His name translates as "Sun Shining on Moose Horns."

He lived on land which is now the site of the city of Wathena in Doniphan County, Kansas.

== Memorials ==
- The town of Wathena, Kansas, is named for Wathena.
- Two United States Navy ships have been named for him:
  - The cargo ship USS Wathena (ID-3884), in commission in 1919.
  - The large harbor tug USS Wathena (YTB-825), in service from 1973 until 1997.
