= Brenner Vineyards Historic District =

Historic district in Kansas, United States

- U.S. National Register of Historic Places
- U.S. Historic district
- Location within Kansas Location within the United States
- Location: Southwest and northwest of the junction of Mineral Point and 95th Rds., near Doniphan, Kansas
- Coordinates: 39°38′26″N 95°05′09″W
- Area: 4.9 acres (2.0 ha)
- Built: 1867
- Architectural style: Classical Revival
- NRHP reference No.: 04001514
- Added to NRHP: May 24, 2005

Brenner Vineyards Historic District, near Doniphan, Kansas, includes history dating from 1867. It is a 4.9 acres (2.0 ha) historic district which was listed on the National Register of Historic Places in 2005. It has also been known as the Adam Brenner and Jacob Brenner Farmsteads.

It includes Classical Revival architecture. The district included eight contributing buildings and one contributing site.

It includes two parcels southwest and northwest of the intersection of Mineral Point and 95th Roads.
