= St. Martha's AME Church and Parsonage =

Historic church in Kansas, United States

- U.S. National Register of Historic Places
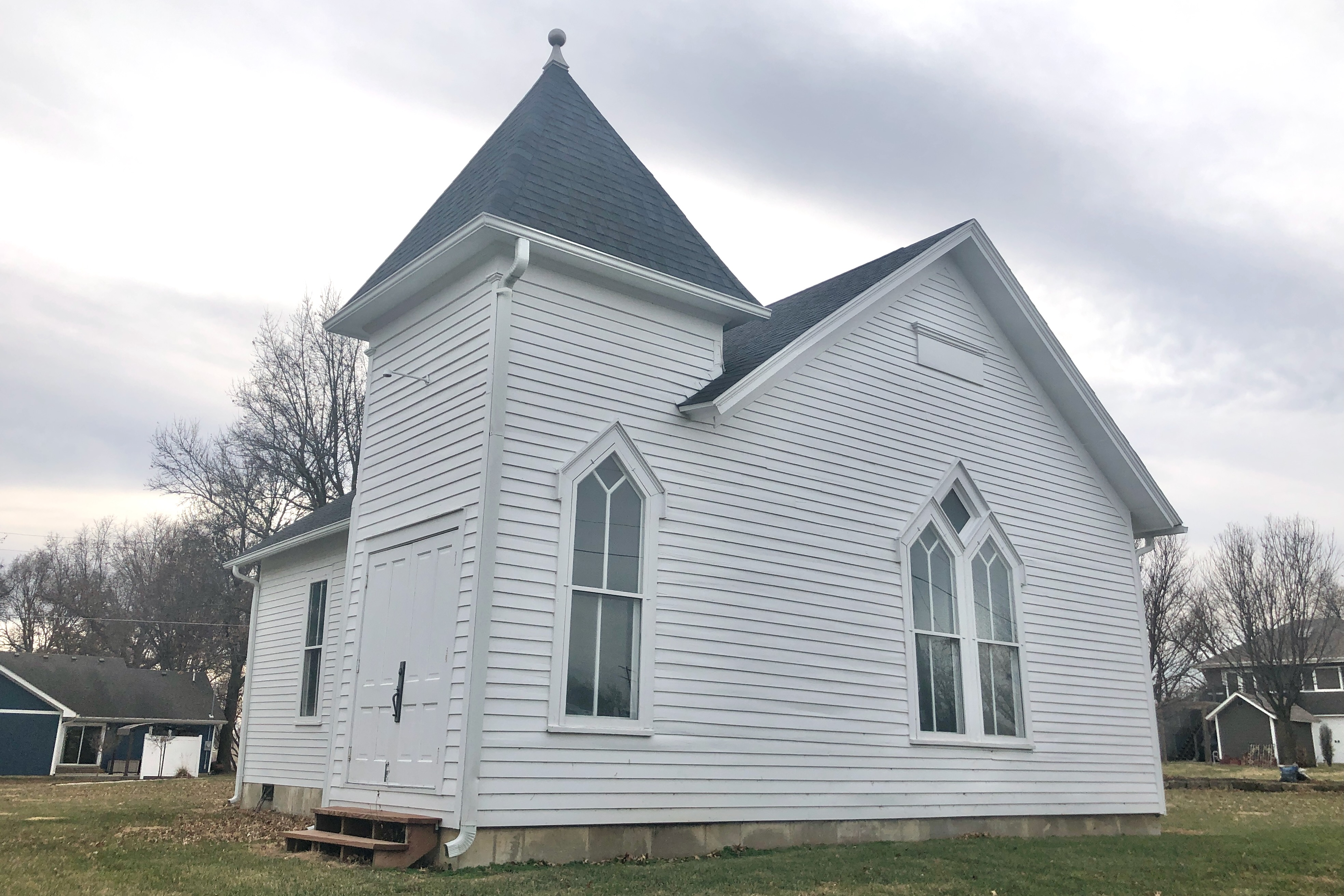
- St. Martha's AME Church from the northeast

- Location within Kansas Location within the United States
- Location: SW corner of Main and Canada, Highland, Kansas
- Coordinates: 39°51′33″N 95°15′41″W
- Area: less than one acre
- Built: c.1882
- Architectural style: Side-steeple church, Other
- NRHP reference No.: 00000757
- Added to NRHP: July 20, 2000

The St. Martha's AME Church and Parsonage in Highland, Kansas is a historic site at the southwest corner of Main and Canada. It was built in 1882 and added to the National Register of Historic Places in 2000.

It includes the St. Martha's A.M.E. Church, built c.1882, a one-story gable roof building with clapboard exterior. It also includes a one-and-a-half-story parsonage, also built c.1882.
