= Bendena, Kansas =

Unincorporated community in Doniphan County, Kansas

- CDP
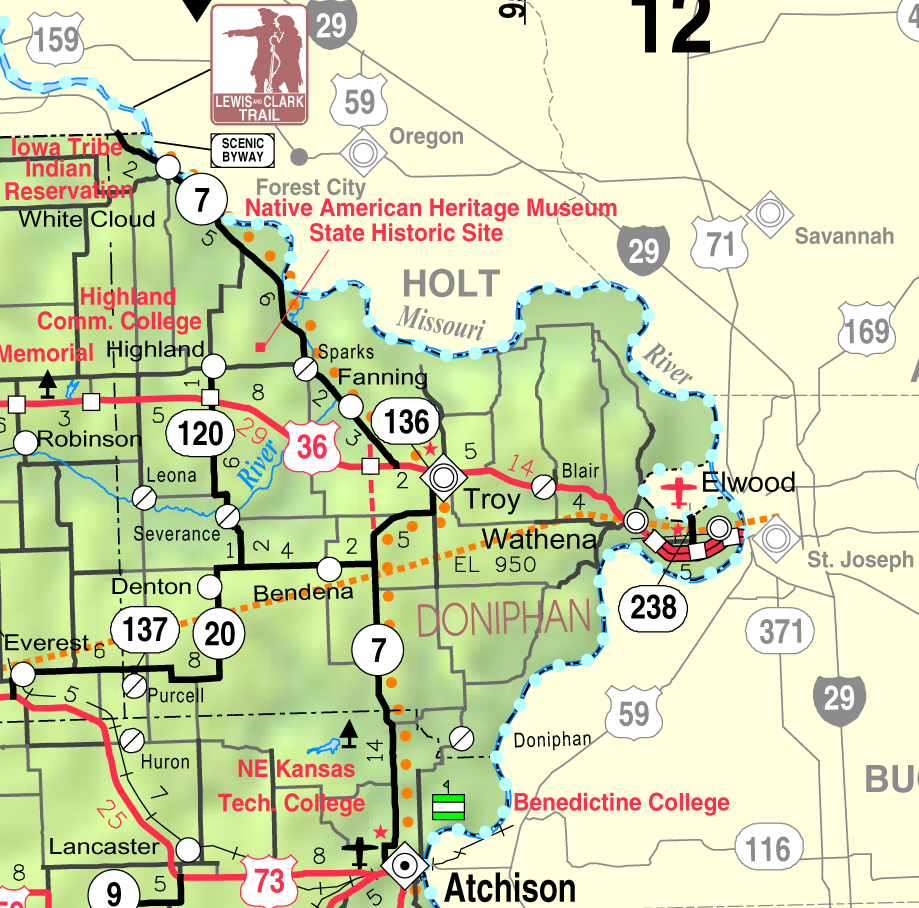
- KDOT map of Doniphan County (legend)

- Location within Kansas Location within the United States
- Coordinates: 39°44′28″N 95°10′46″W
- Country: United States
- State: Kansas
- County: Doniphan
- Founded: 1886

Area
  - Total: 1.53 sq mi (3.96 km^{2})
  - Land: 1.53 sq mi (3.96 km^{2})
  - Water: 0 sq mi (0.0 km^{2})
- Elevation: 1,112 ft (339 m)

Population (2020)
  - Total: 117
  - Density: 76.5/sq mi (29.5/km^{2})
- Time zone: UTC-6 (CST)
  - Summer (DST): UTC-5 (CDT)
- ZIP Code: 66008
- Area code: 785
- FIPS code: 20-05975
- GNIS ID: 473280

Bendena is a census-designated place (CDP) in Doniphan County, Kansas, United States. As of the 2020 census, the population was 117.

== History ==
Bendena was founded in 1886. It was originally given the name of Albers, after John Albers, who farmed on this land. But when the United States Postal Service established a post office there, they required a change of name because of similarities to other town names in Kansas. It was then named for the sweetheart of the first telegraph operator at the Chicago, Kansas and Nebraska railroad station.

The first post office in Bendena was established in January 1888. Its ZIP Code is 66008.

== Geography ==
Bendena is located southwest of the center of Doniphan County, along highway K-20. It is 7 miles (11 km) southwest of Troy, the county seat, and 15 miles (24 km) north of Atchison.

According to the U.S. Census Bureau, the CDP has an area of 1.53 square miles (3.96 km^{2}), all land.

== Demographics ==
Historical population
Census	Pop.	Note	%±
2010	117		—
2020	117		0.0%
U.S. Decennial Census

The community is part of the St. Joseph, MO–KS Metropolitan Statistical Area.

The 2020 United States census counted 117 people, 52 households, and 34 families in Bendena. The population density was 76.5 per square mile (29.5/km^{2}). There were 59 housing units at an average density of 38.6 per square mile (14.9/km^{2}). The racial makeup was 93.16% (109) white or European American (91.45% non-Hispanic white), 0.0% (0) black or African-American, 0.0% (0) Native American or Alaska Native, 0.0% (0) Asian, 0.0% (0) Pacific Islander or Native Hawaiian, 0.0% (0) from other races, and 6.84% (8) from two or more races. Hispanic or Latino of any race was 3.42% (4) of the population.

Of the 52 households, 28.8% had children under the age of 18; 55.8% were married couples living together; 26.9% had a female householder with no spouse or partner present. 30.8% of households consisted of individuals and 21.2% had someone living alone who was 65 years of age or older. The average household size was 2.0 and the average family size was 2.7. The percent of those with a bachelor's degree or higher was estimated to be 40.2% of the population.

18.8% of the population was under the age of 18, 6.0% from 18 to 24, 20.5% from 25 to 44, 28.2% from 45 to 64, and 26.5% who were 65 years of age or older. The median age was 56.3 years. For every 100 females, there were 101.7 males. For every 100 females ages 18 and older, there were 126.2 males.

The 2016–2020 5-year American Community Survey estimates show that the median household income was $50,938 (with a margin of error of +/- $33,623) and the median family income was $106,250 (+/- $25,114). Males had a median income of $41,719 (+/- $18,626) versus $38,750 (+/- $7,568) for females. The median income for those above 16 years old was $40,938 (+/- $6,065). Approximately, 0.0% of families and 5.6% of the population were below the poverty line, including 0.0% of those under the age of 18 and 0.0% of those ages 65 or over.

== Education ==
The community is served by Doniphan West USD 111 public school district.
