= Wathena, Kansas =

City in Doniphan County, Kansas

- City
- Location within Doniphan County and Kansas

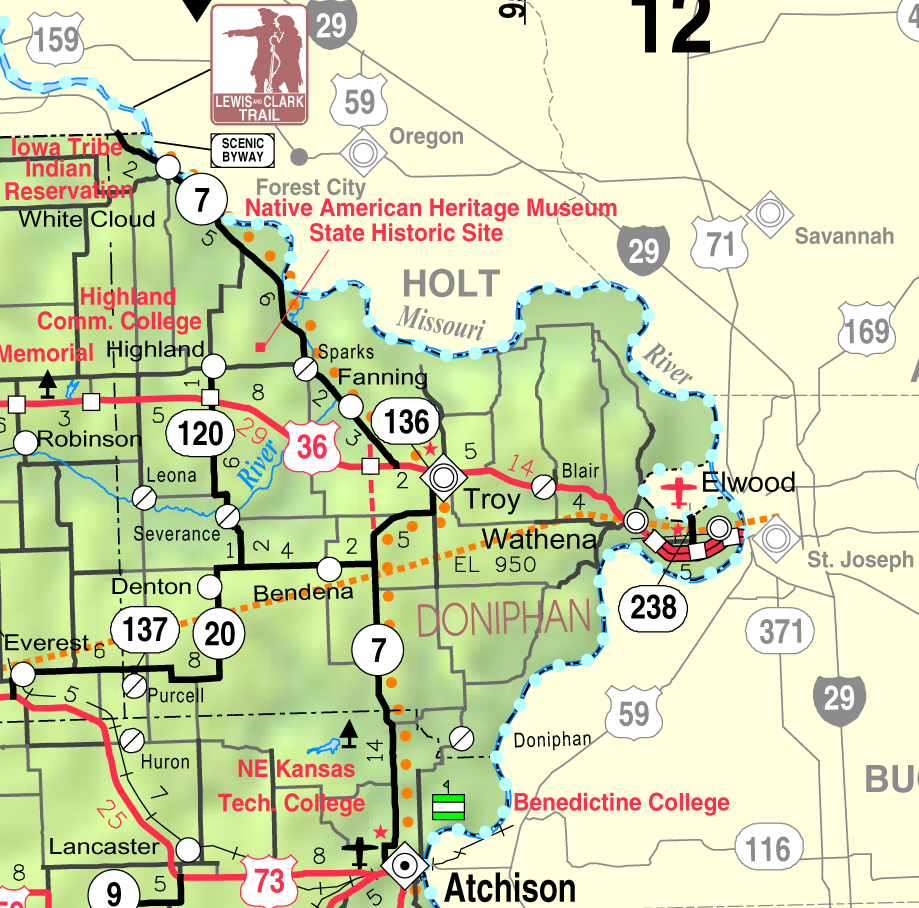
- KDOT map of Doniphan County (legend)
- Coordinates: 39°45′30″N 94°56′22″W
- Country: United States
- State: Kansas
- County: Doniphan
- Founded: 1861
- Incorporated: 1873
- Named for: Chief Wathena

Area
  - Total: 2.38 sq mi (6.17 km^{2})
  - Land: 2.34 sq mi (6.07 km^{2})
  - Water: 0.042 sq mi (0.11 km^{2})
- Elevation: 814 ft (248 m)

Population (2020)
  - Total: 1,246
  - Density: 532/sq mi (205/km^{2})
- Time zone: UTC-6 (CST)
  - Summer (DST): UTC-5 (CDT)
- ZIP Code: 66090
- Area code: 785
- FIPS code: 20-76000
- GNIS ID: 2397215
- Website: City website

Wathena is a city in Doniphan County, Kansas, United States, located about 5 miles (8.0 km) west of St. Joseph, Missouri. As of the 2020 census, the population of the city was 1,246.

== History ==
Wathena was founded in 1856. The city is named in honor of Chief Wathena, a Native American chief of the Kickapoo tribe who previously lived in the area.

The first post office in Wathena was established in 1855, but before August, 1859, the post office was called Bryan.

The St. Joseph & Denver Railroad was extended to Wathena in 1860.

Wathena was incorporated as a city in 1873.

== Geography ==
According to the United States Census Bureau, the city has a total area of 2.31 square miles (5.98 km^{2}), of which 2.28 square miles (5.91 km^{2}) is land and 0.03 square miles (0.08 km^{2}) is water.

== Demographics ==
Historical population
Census	Pop.	Note	%±
1880	710		—
1890	694		−2.3%
1900	798		15.0%
1910	777		−2.6%
1920	645		−17.0%
1930	854		32.4%
1940	860		0.7%
1950	797		−7.3%
1960	837		5.0%
1970	1,150		37.4%
1980	1,418		23.3%
1990	1,160		−18.2%
2000	1,348		16.2%
2010	1,364		1.2%
2020	1,246		−8.7%
U.S. Decennial Census

Wathena is part of the St. Joseph, MO–KS Metropolitan Statistical Area.

=== 2010 census ===
As of the census of 2010, there were 1,364 people, 550 households, and 365 families living in the city. The population density was 598.2 inhabitants per square mile (231.0/km^{2}). There were 587 housing units at an average density of 257.5 per square mile (99.4/km^{2}). The racial makeup of the city was 96.6% White, 1.3% African American, 0.3% Native American, 0.3% Asian, and 1.5% from two or more races. Hispanic or Latino of any race were 1.1% of the population.

There were 550 households, of which 32.4% had children under the age of 18 living with them, 50.0% were married couples living together, 12.7% had a female householder with no husband present, 3.6% had a male householder with no wife present, and 33.6% were non-families. 29.5% of all households were made up of individuals, and 13.2% had someone living alone who was 65 years of age or older. The average household size was 2.40 and the average family size was 2.92.

The median age in the city was 40.9 years. 24.7% of residents were under the age of 18; 6.5% were between the ages of 18 and 24; 24.9% were from 25 to 44; 25.9% were from 45 to 64; and 17.8% were 65 years of age or older. The gender makeup of the city was 47.2% male and 52.8% female.

=== 2000 census ===
As of the census of 2000, there were 1,348 people, 524 households, and 345 families living in the city. The population density was 690.6 inhabitants per square mile (266.6/km^{2}). There were 566 housing units at an average density of 290.0 per square mile (112.0/km^{2}). The racial makeup of the city was 97.48% White, 0.67% African American, 0.59% Native American, 0.30% from other races, and 0.96% from two or more races. Hispanic or Latino of any race were 0.96% of the population.

There were 524 households, out of which 34.4% had children under the age of 18 living with them, 53.4% were married couples living together, 10.3% had a female householder with no husband present, and 34.0% were non-families. 30.2% of all households were made up of individuals, and 14.7% had someone living alone who was 65 years of age or older. The average household size was 2.48 and the average family size was 3.14.

In the city, the population was spread out, with 27.3% under the age of 18, 8.7% from 18 to 24, 25.8% from 25 to 44, 23.0% from 45 to 64, and 15.2% who were 65 years of age or older. The median age was 36 years. For every 100 females, there were 85.7 males. For every 100 females age 18 and over, there were 81.1 males.

The median income for a household in the city was $34,046, and the median income for a family was $40,216. Males had a median income of $31,618 versus $20,800 for females. The per capita income for the city was $15,440. About 5.5% of families and 9.8% of the population were below the poverty line, including 11.6% of those under age 18 and 17.2% of those age 65 or over.

== Education ==
The community is served by Riverside USD 114 public school district. School unification in 2010 consolidated Elwood schools and Wathena schools forming USD 114. The Riverside High School mascot is Cyclones.

Wathena High School closed through school unification. The Wathena High School mascot was Wathena Wildcats.

== Notable people ==
- Louis W. Staudenmaier, Wisconsin state legislator and lawyer, was born in Wathena.
