= Iowa and Sac & Fox Mission State Historic Site =

Historic mission in Kansas, United States

- Iowa, Sac, and Fox Presbyterian Mission
- U.S. National Register of Historic Places
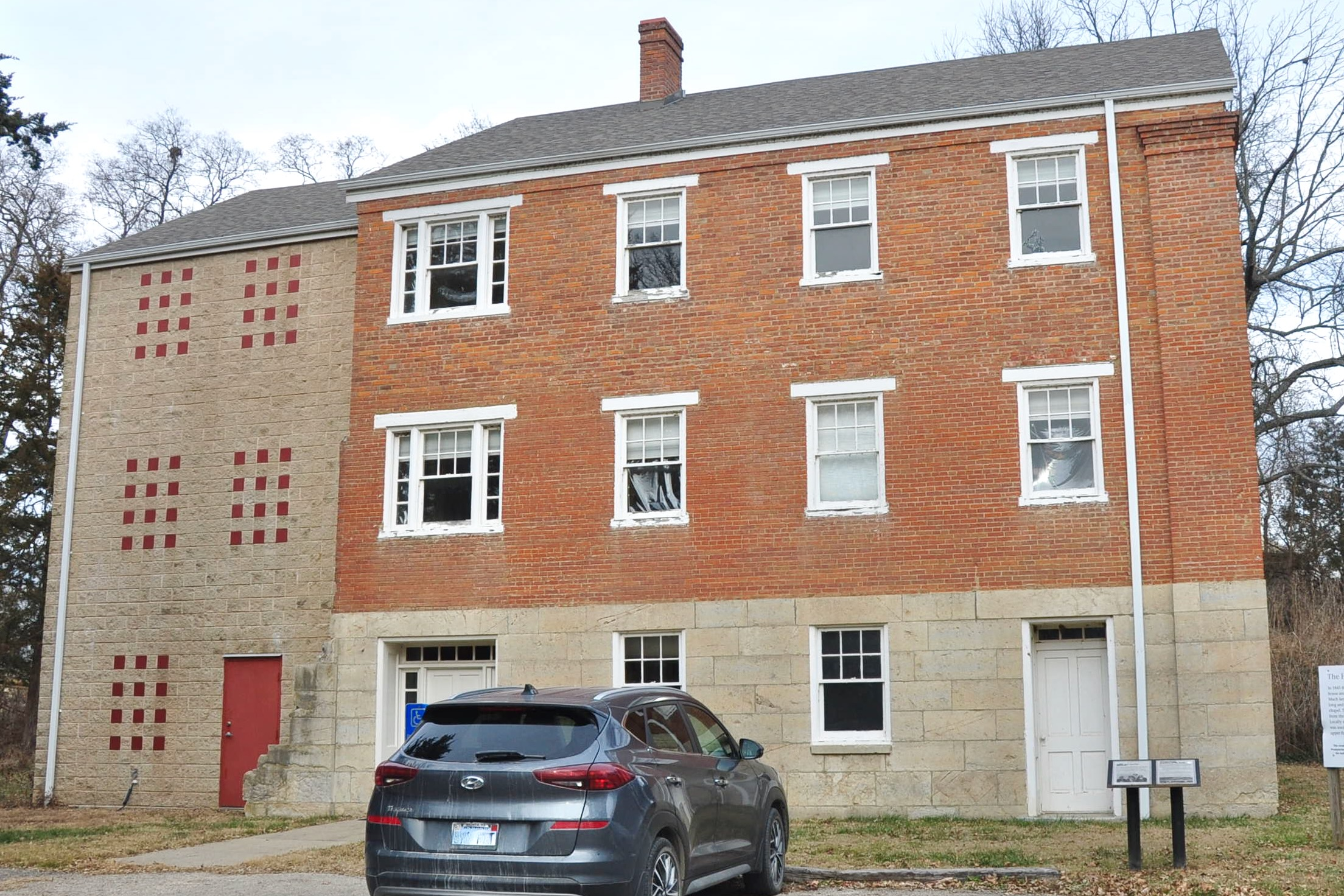
- The Iowa and Sac & Fox Mission State Historic Site in 2023

- Location within Kansas Location within the United States
- Location: 1737 Elgin Rd., near Highland, Kansas
- Coordinates: 39°51′51″N 95°13′45″W
- Area: 9.9 acres (4.0 ha)
- Built: 1846
- NRHP reference No.: 70000248
- Added to NRHP: December 2, 1970

The Iowa and Sac & Fox Mission State Historic Site, also known as the Highland Presbyterian Mission, is the site of a mission that housed the children of two local tribes between 1845 and 1863.

A historic Presbyterian mission building at the site, near Highland, Kansas, has been listed on the National Register of Historic Places since 1970, listed as Iowa, Sac, and Fox Presbyterian Mission.

The building served as a museum from 1996 to 2008. The museum reopened in 2022.

== Mission building ==
The building is a three-story stone and brick building topped by a belfrey giving it total height of 52 feet (16 m). It is 106 by 37 feet (32 m × 11 m) in plan. The building was constructed in 1846 to replace an earlier building. The mission was used as a church and school by the Native Americans in the area. The building added to the National Register of Historic Places in 1970.

== History ==
In 1836 William Clark (acting as superintendent of Indian affairs) negotiated a treaty with the Iowa people and the Sac and Fox Nation of Missouri in Kansas and Nebraska. The treaty ceded all the tribal land from Missouri to the Missouri river for $7,500; in return the government promised to build five homes and provide goods and services to the tribes. When the tribes started moving to their new established grounds the missionaries had seen an opportunity to spread their word to people in "decline" and decided to set up a mission. The mission was known as "The loway and Sac Mission" by the missionaries.

A Presbyterianism mission was established (1837) roughly two miles (3.2 km) from present day Highland, Kansas by Samuel M. Irvin and his wife before being joined by Reverend William Hamilton. Irvin was sent to the Highland area by the Presbyterian Board of Missions to establish an agricultural mission for the Iowa and Sac & Fox people, who were traditionally hunters. Irvin tried to teach the tribes to raise livestock and farm. Since he had little success, the missions board changed its tactics to teach younger children in an attempt to change the cultures.

The original mission building was a one-story log structure but a permanent structure was authorized by the presbyterian board of foreign missions in 1844 with the building being completed by July 1846. The finished building was three stories high and a belfry that combined made a total height of 52 feet. The building footprint was 107 feet long by 37 feet long. The building was made of limestone and bricks manufactured on site. There were 32 rooms including a dining hall and chapel.

Samuel Irvin requested that the missionary board supply him with a printing press in order to print books and religious texts in the Iowa language; the press was approved and received at the mission in 1843. All lessons were taught in English and the Iowa language with common study topics including spelling, Arithmetic, and geography and an emphasis on industrial, domestic, and farming skills. Irvin and Hamiliton printed several books in the Iowa language to aid in learning including An Elementary Book of the Ioway Language and a religious book called Original Hymns in the Ioway Language. Irvin and Hamilton had to develop a Syllabary for the Iowa language in order to translate and print the aforementioned books above. A small apology was included in the text explaining that any problems or defects found in the type were due to their inexperience as printmakers with little outside help. "Any defect, which may appear in the mechanical execution... our experience in the art has been acquired entirely in the Indian country, and without any instructor." nine titles were produced out of the mission and was the second printing press in the state of Kansas.

The mission's main goal was to dissuade tribal culture and transform the Indians into self-sufficient farmers with Christian beliefs. On average about 40 students lived at the mission. a typical day at the mission is waking up at 5am, having 6 hours of school from 9 am and all non-school hours spent at work under Irvin's leadership. Girls were taught homemaking and housekeeping by Mrs. Eliza Irvin.

from the early 1840s to 1965 the Oregon Trail was active with the mission acting as a lucrative destination due its position on the trail. The tribes benefited by charging a toll over their bridge but the travelers who came through brought diseases along with them. Diseases such as smallpox and cholera caused epidemics causing the tribes to move away from the mission.

Kansas–Nebraska Act (1854) brought further reductions to the Indian reservations and increased the distance between the mission and the reservations; this made it difficult for the tribes' children to attend causing the closure of the mission in 1863. In 1856 the mission had 44 students.

The mission found new life as an orphanage and was operated from 1863 to 1866. The mission then sat empty from 1866 to 1868 until the western side of the building was razed to make a dormatory leaving only 40 percent of the original structure.

the Northeast Kansas Historical Society decided to preserve the remaining portion of the building that had been acting as a private residence from 1905 to 1937. in 1941 the state had acquired the property and has been declared a state historical site since 1963. The building was added to the National Register of Historic Places in 1970. In 1996 the museum was renovated and reopened as a museum for native American arts until its closure in 2008.

In 2021 the state relinquished control of the property to the Iowa tribe of Kansas and became part of the Ioway Tribal National Park. The Museum was reopened in 2022.

The site is located 1.5 miles (2.4 km) east of Highland on 240th Road and .2 miles (0.32 km) north on Elgin Road.
