= Highland, Kansas =

City in Doniphan County, Kansas

- City
- Location within Doniphan County and Kansas

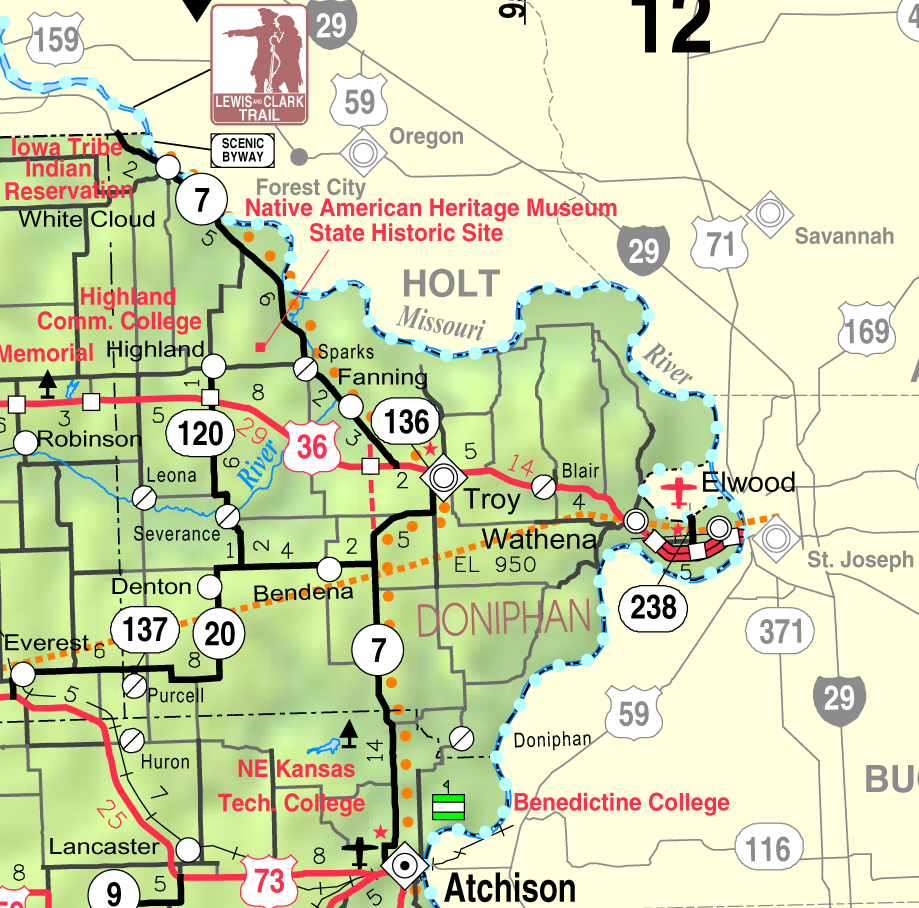
- KDOT map of Doniphan County (legend)
- Coordinates: 39°51′37″N 95°15′55″W
- Country: United States
- State: Kansas
- County: Doniphan
- Founded: 1854
- Platted: 1857
- Incorporated: 1857
- Named for: Highland, Illinois

Area
  - Total: 0.53 sq mi (1.36 km^{2})
  - Land: 0.53 sq mi (1.36 km^{2})
  - Water: 0 sq mi (0.00 km^{2})
- Elevation: 1,037 ft (316 m)

Population (2020)
  - Total: 903
  - Density: 1,720/sq mi (664/km^{2})
- Time zone: UTC-6 (CST)
  - Summer (DST): UTC-5 (CDT)
- ZIP Code: 66035
- Area code: 785
- FIPS code: 20-31850
- GNIS ID: 239437
- Website: highlandks.com

Highland is a city in Doniphan County, Kansas, United States. As of the 2020 census, the population of the city was 903. It is home to Highland Community College.

== History ==
=== Short summary ===
The Highland Township was started with the founding of the Iowa and Sac & Fox Mission State Historic Site by Reverend Samuel Irvin and Reverend William Hamilton in 1837. The mission was sponsored and funded by the Presbyterians. The Founders plan behind the town was to make it an educational town and in 1857 when the town was laid out a spot was chosen for the future university. Samuel Irvin established the first Highland Community College Building Irvin Hall with the building being built in 1858. The college was chartered and founded in 1858 and has gone through eight name changes over the course of its history.

In 2011 Highland became the self proclaimed Snowflake City of Kansas

=== Early history ===
Reverend Samuel Irvin and Reverend William Hamilton found the Ioway Presbtaryian Church in 1843 with Rev. Hamilton acting as Minister. The church was moved from the Mission to Highland in 1860. John Powers Johnson builds a log home 2 miles west of the mission in 1854 due to land unavailability along the Missouri River. The Cabin was the first Building in Highland sitting on the site of the current Senior Citizen Center. Johnson left Kansas for two years as he didn't have to live in the home he only had to make improvements to the land in order to purchase it under the Preemption Act of 1841 he however could not purchase the land until after the Iowa tribe members had been removed and the land had been surveyed. John Bayless preempted the land just west of Johnson and founded the Susquehanna western Immigration Company to promote anti-slavery people moving to Kansas. Samuel Irvin looked over the claims till the land could properly be purchased in 1857.

=== The Highland Town Company ===
On May 16, 1857, the Highland Town Company was formed buying town lots to resell to what they had hoped to be a bustling town. Bayless was the Company's president with Johnson acting as Secretary and Irvin as the treasurer. The town company had built some amenities such as a large hotel despite slow growth. The town struggled to gain population but despite its small size the town had a newspaper called The Highlander and the first bank arrived by 1862 being opened by Johnson. These three founding fathers hoped that Highland would become not only an educational center but also a religious center for Kansas and surrounding territories. In November 1857 the Highland Presbytery was organized as part of the Missouri Synod and eventually came to encompass all 21 old school presbyteries in the Kansas and Nebraska territories.

=== Highland University ===
At the first meeting of the presbytery, it was decided by the members that a Presbyterian academy would be established in highland. On December 26, 1857, the board had decided that the academy which could be compared to a private high school was not sufficient and voted to established Highland University instead with James Cambell as president and Samuel Irvin as Secretary. The board of trustees prepared a charter that was taken to Lecompton the Territorial capital of Kansas and was passed and signed by Governor Denver on February 9, 1858. Highland Town Company then reserved 4 blocks on the west side of town for the University. Elementary classes were held at the college until a Grade school was opened in the mid 1870s.

== Geography ==
According to the United States Census Bureau, the city has a total area of 0.53 square miles (1.37 km^{2}), all land.

=== Climate ===
Climate data for Highland, Kansas
Month	Jan	Feb	Mar	Apr	May	Jun	Jul	Aug	Sep	Oct	Nov	Dec	Year
Average precipitation inches	0.83	1.16	2.33	3.63	5.10	4.91	5.07	3.72	4.12	2.92	2.01	1.19	36.99
Average precipitation mm	21	29	59	92	130	125	129	94	105	74	51	30	939
Source: NOAA

== Demographics ==
Historical population
Census	Pop.	Note	%±
1860	120		—
1870	282		135.0%
1880	441		56.4%
1890	493		11.8%
1900	780		58.2%
1910	763		−2.2%
1920	809		6.0%
1930	788		−2.6%
1940	764		−3.0%
1950	717		−6.2%
1960	755		5.3%
1970	899		19.1%
1980	954		6.1%
1990	942		−1.3%
2000	976		3.6%
2010	1,012		3.7%
2020	903		−10.8%
U.S. Decennial Census

Highland is part of the St. Joseph, Missouri–Kansas Metropolitan Statistical Area.

=== 2020 census ===
The 2020 United States census counted 903 people, 251 households, and 160 families in Highland. The population density was 1,720.0 per square mile (664.1/km^{2}). There were 341 housing units at an average density of 649.5 per square mile (250.8/km^{2}). The racial makeup was 75.64% (683) white or European American (73.31% non-Hispanic white), 15.61% (141) black or African-American, 1.55% (14) Native American or Alaska Native, 0.89% (8) Asian, 0.0% (0) Pacific Islander or Native Hawaiian, 2.1% (19) from other races, and 4.21% (38) from two or more races. Hispanic or Latino of any race was 4.65% (42) of the population.

Of the 251 households, 29.5% had children under the age of 18; 49.0% were married couples living together; 22.3% had a female householder with no spouse or partner present. 33.1% of households consisted of individuals and 14.3% had someone living alone who was 65 years of age or older. The average household size was 2.6 and the average family size was 3.2. The percent of those with a bachelor's degree or higher was estimated to be 13.7% of the population.

14.0% of the population was under the age of 18, 36.3% from 18 to 24, 16.2% from 25 to 44, 16.1% from 45 to 64, and 17.5% who were 65 years of age or older. The median age was 24.9 years. For every 100 females, there were 82.4 males. For every 100 females ages 18 and older, there were 79.0 males.

The 2016–2020 5-year American Community Survey estimates show that the median household income was $65,208 (with a margin of error of +/- $16,964) and the median family income was $74,063 (+/- $9,690). Males had a median income of $9,618 (+/- $2,646) versus $7,389 (+/- $2,433) for females. The median income for those above 16 years old was $8,413 (+/- $1,908). Approximately, 11.8% of families and 16.3% of the population were below the poverty line, including 26.1% of those under the age of 18 and 14.0% of those ages 65 or over.

=== 2010 census ===
At the 2010 census, there were 1,012 people, 296 households and 155 families living in the city. The population density was 1,909.4 inhabitants per square mile (737.2/km^{2}). There were 372 housing units at an average density of 701.9 per square mile (271.0/km^{2}). The racial makeup of the city was 84.7% White, 10.0% African American, 1.1% Native American, 0.4% Asian, 0.8% from other races, and 3.1% from two or more races. Hispanic or Latino of any race were 2.0% of the population.

There were 296 households, of which 23.6% had children under the age of 18 living with them, 41.6% were married couples living together, 7.8% had a female householder with no husband present, 3.0% had a male householder with no wife present, and 47.6% were non-families. 39.9% of all households were made up of individuals, and 16.2% had someone living alone who was 65 years of age or older. The average household size was 2.16 and the average family size was 2.94.

The median age in the city was 21.8 years. 12.7% of residents were under the age of 18; 41.8% were between the ages of 18 and 24; 14.6% were from 25 to 44; 17.2% were from 45 to 64; and 13.8% were 65 years of age or older. The sex makeup of the city was 53.3% male and 46.7% female.

=== 2000 census ===
At the 2000 census, there were 976 people, 316 households and 169 families living in the city. The population density was 1,842.6 inhabitants per square mile (711.4/km^{2}). There were 344 housing units at an average density of 649.5 per square mile (250.8/km^{2}). The racial makeup of the city was 90.27% White, 5.74% African American, 1.02% Native American, 0.20% Asian, 0.92% from other races, and 1.84% from two or more races. Hispanic or Latino of any race were 1.33% of the population.

There were 316 households, of which 20.3% had children under the age of 18 living with them, 44.6% were married couples living together, 7.3% had a female householder with no husband present, and 46.5% were non-families. 41.8% of all households were made up of individuals, and 22.2% had someone living alone who was 65 years of age or older. The average household size was 2.02 and the average family size was 2.76.

12.3% of the population were under the age of 18, 36.5% from 18 to 24, 14.2% from 25 to 44, 15.2% from 45 to 64, and 21.8% who were 65 years of age or older. The median age was 28 years. For every 100 females, there were 95.6 males. For every 100 females age 18 and over, there were 100.5 males.

The median household income was $25,250 and the median family income was $37,969. Males had a median income of $30,298 compared with $22,250 for females. The per capita income for the city was $12,341. About 9.0% of families and 17.4% of the population were below the poverty line, including 10.6% of those under age 18 and 13.9% of those age 65 or over.

== Education ==
=== Primary and secondary education ===
The community is served by Doniphan West USD 111 public school district, and home to Doniphan West Jr/Sr High School since 2009. The Doniphan West Jr/Sr High School mascot is Doniphan West Mustangs.

Highland High School was closed through school unification. The Highland Blue Streaks won the Kansas State High School boys class 1A Track & Field championship in 1969 and 1990.

=== Colleges and universities ===
Highland Community College is a Kansas Jayhawk Community College Conference (KJCCC) member school.

== Notable people ==
- John Misse, baseball player

== See also ==
- National Register of Historic Places listings in Doniphan County, Kansas
- The Highlands, Kansas
