= Whig Valley (Missouri) =

Valley in Missouri, U.S.

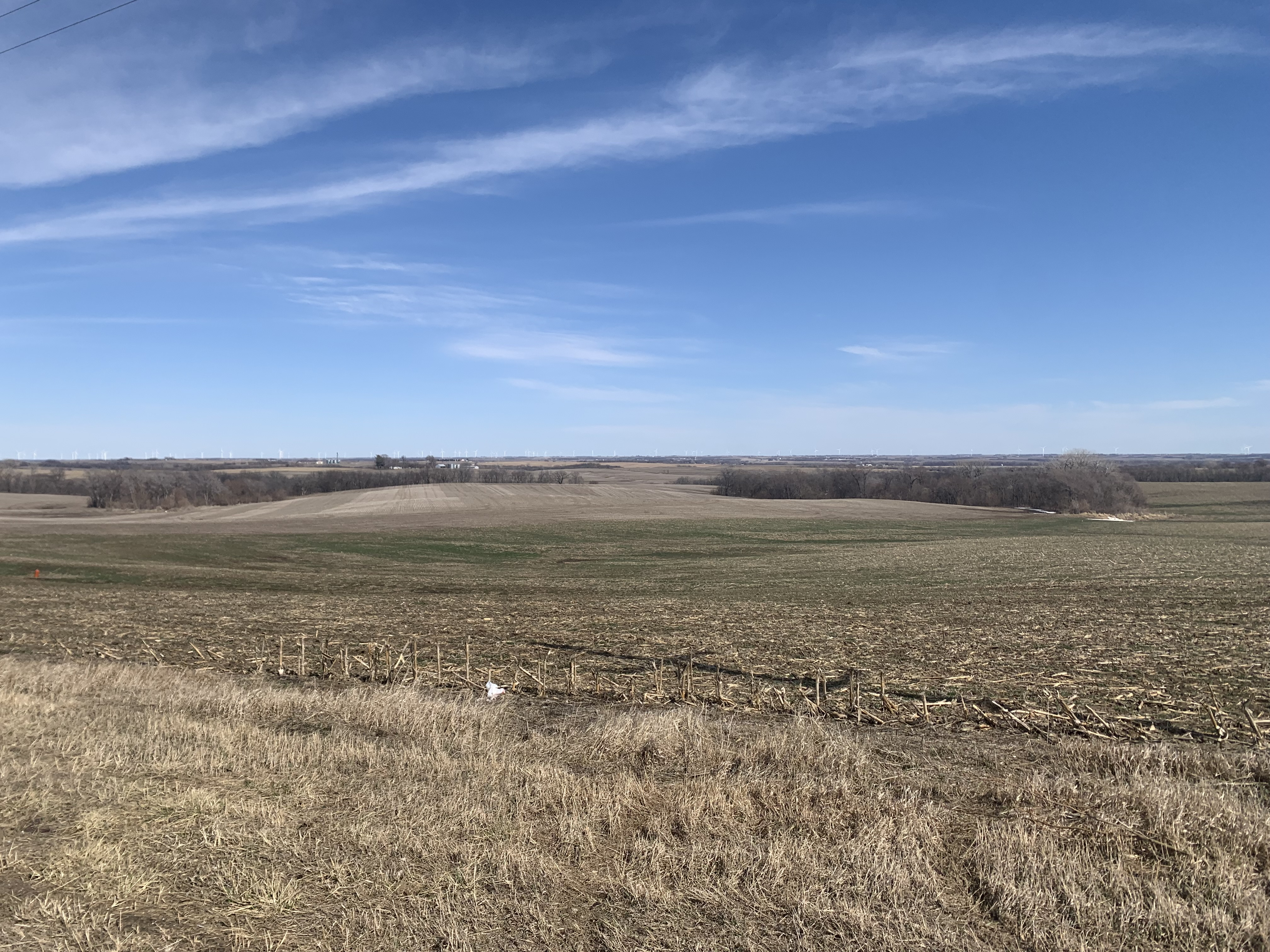
- View of Whig Valley from Route D southwest of Maitland.
- Interactive map of Whig Valley
- Coordinates: 40°10′22″N 95°05′30″W
- Location: Holt and Nodaway counties
- Etymology: Whig Party
- Elevation: 876 feet (267 m)
- Highest elevation: 1,100 feet (340 m)
- GNIS feature ID: 728701

Whig Valley is a fertile valley generally between Maitland and Mound City, in northeastern Holt County, in the U.S. state of Missouri. Whig Valley was also the name of a small community once present there in the 19th-century.

== History ==
Whig Valley was first settled in 1846 by Theodore Higley and gave the locality its name due to his admiration of Whig Party political leader Henry Clay. The majority of settlers in Whig Valley were from Kentucky, Tennessee, and Virginia. Similarly, in nearby southwestern Nodaway County near Fairview settlers named their locale Whig Valley as well. During the Civil War many of the originally settlers left this region and northerners from Ohio came in.

A post office was established in 1861 and named Whig Valley in this area. Later a store was built in 1870, and the town was platted in 1876. But when Maitland was established in 1881, the town of Whig Valley dissipated, and the post office closed that same year.

A spur route of the Kansas City, St. Joseph, and Council Bluffs Railroad travelled from Bigelow northeasterly through Holt County to Maitland. There was a train station south of the original site of the village called Whig Valley; this train station came to be in the 1880s and was called Whig Valley.

Maitland remains the only community in the valley to this day.

== Geography ==
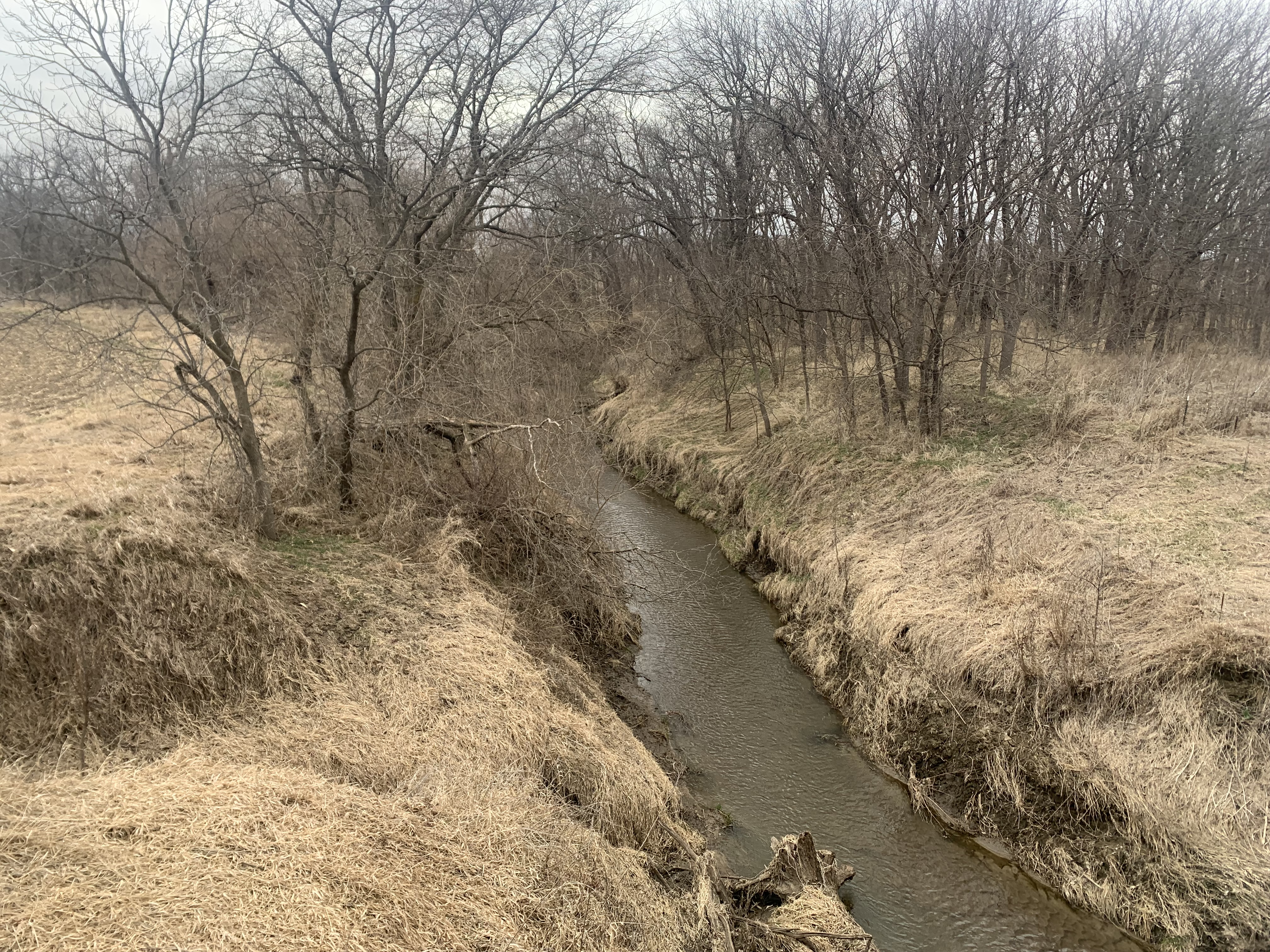
Highly Creek at Route 113 bridge

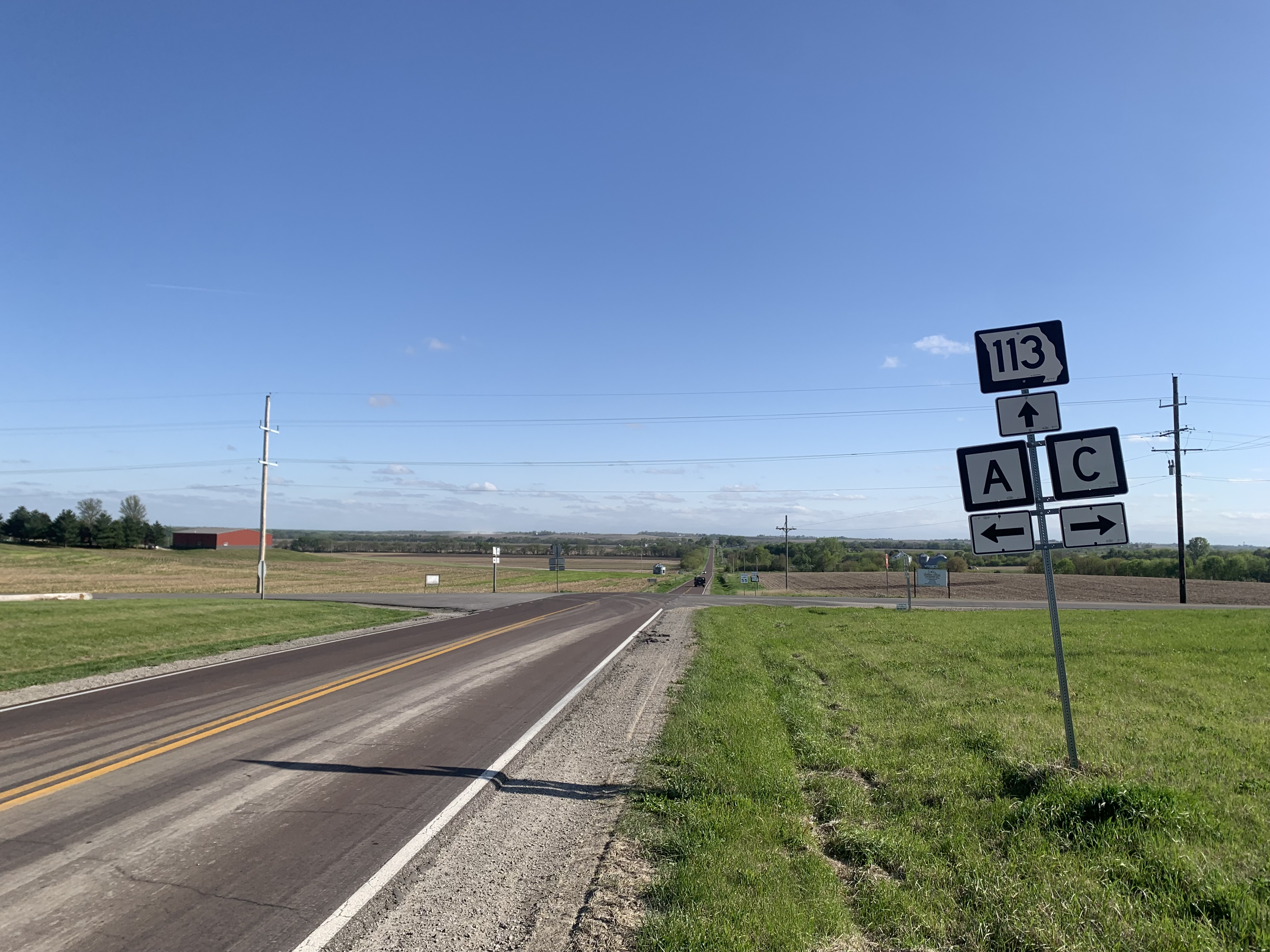
Route 113 west of Maitland, facing south

Whig Valley is localized around Clay Township and Hickory Township, though it may extend into eastern Benton Township and Hickory Township as well as the western portions of Green Township and Monroe Township in Nodaway County.

Highly Creek is the largest stream that flows through this area, depositing in the Nodaway River south of Maitland, two other streams Buck Creek and Whig Valley also makeup the waterways of this subregion.

Route 113 is the only major highway that traverses this valley, traveling north-south along the eastern side, paralleling the Nodaway River.

=== Communities ===
The extinct hamlets of Kings Grove, Whig Valley, and White's Ford all existed in this area. White's Ford was along the Nodaway River around where Maitland is today. Fairview in Nodaway County was also located in the "Whig Valley District".

== See also ==
- Bilby Ranch Lake Conservation Area
