= Missouri Route 118 =

State highway in Missouri, U.S.

Route 118
- Route 118 highlighted in red

Route information
- Maintained by MoDOT
- Length: 6.801 mi (10.945 km)

Major junctions
- West end: Route 111 west of Bigelow
- I-29 in Mound City
- East end: US 59 in Mound City

Location
- Country: United States
- State: Missouri
- County: Holt

Highway system
- Missouri State Highway System; Interstate; US; State; Supplemental
← Route 117	→ Route 119

Route 118 is a highway in Holt County, Missouri. Its eastern terminus is at U.S. Route 59 (US 59) in Mound City; its western terminus is at Route 111 about six miles (9.7 km) west of Mound City.

== Route description ==
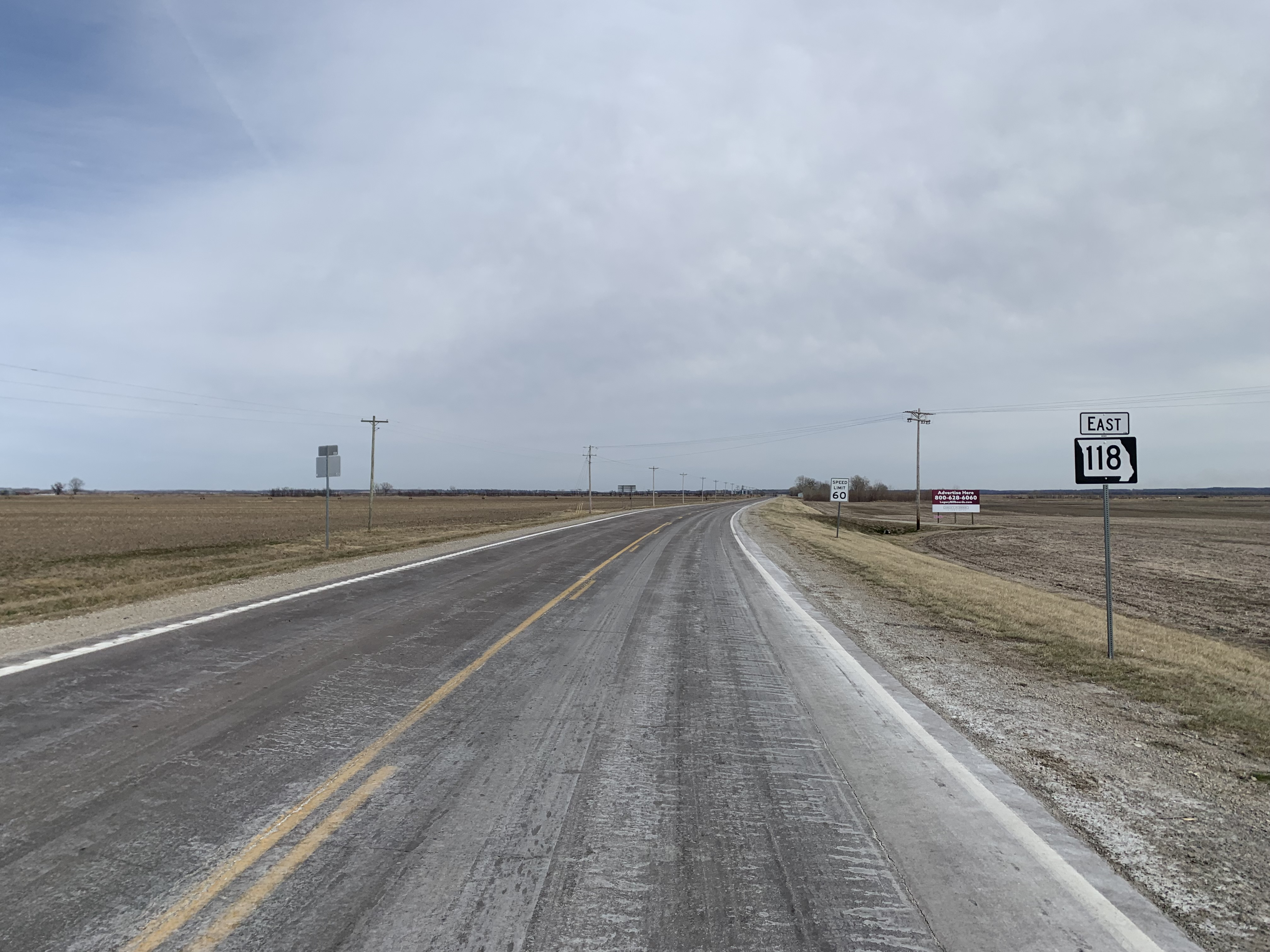
Route 118 facing east from western terminus

Route 118 begins at an intersection with Route 111 in Holt County, heading east on a two-lane undivided road. The route heads through agricultural areas with some trees, intersecting Route P. The road passes through the community of Bigelow, where it crosses BNSF Railway's Napier Subdivision. Past Bigelow, Route 118 curves northeast and passes Loess Bluffs National Wildlife Refuge on its south. The road reaches Mound City, where it comes to an interchange with Interstate 29 (I-29). A short distance later, Route 118 comes to its eastern terminus at US 59.

== History ==
What is now Route 118 began as a simple dirt road connecting Mound City to Bigelow; in Bigelow, it was known as First Street. After the United States Postal Service began mail delivery to Bigelow in 1903, Rural Free Delivery was provided west of Bigelow via this route, which was then known as Bigelow R.F.D. No. 1. A 1924 map designated the portion of road between Mound City and Bigelow as Route 1-C, and the portion west of Bigelow was only a county road. At that time, the road was not a paved road or an all-weather road. By 1927, there was still no bridge, but a ferry, to cross the Tarkio River west of Bigelow. By 1929, the Route 1-C portion became an earthen road that was graded by the state.

By 1930, the modern route numbers first appeared, though Route 1-C was first designated as Route 111, while Route 1-F, which went between Oregon and Forest City, was first designated as Route 118. By 1934, former Route 111 was paved its entire length, and by 1936, Route 111 continued west to Route 118's current western terminus, and this road section was gravel. By 1937, the current extents of Route 111 and Route 118 in southwestern Holt County were established, soon after, their designations were inverted to what they are today. Route 118 was finally the former Route 1-C and the former Bigelow R.F.D. No. 1; its eastern portion paved, and its western portion gravel. By 1940, Route 118 was fully paved.

By 1958, supplemental Route P intersected Route 118 and connected Fortescue to Bigelow. A few years later, in 1962, I-29 was proposed to cross Route 118, just west of its eastern terminus at US 59 in Mound City. By 1975, I-29 was finally constructed from Kansas City to its junction at Route 118 at the proposed location.

== Major intersections ==
The entire route is in Holt County.

Location	mi	km	Destinations	Notes
Bigelow Township	0.000	0.000	Route 111	
Bigelow Township	2.999	4.826	Route P south	
Mound City	6.580– 6.595	10.589– 10.614	I-29	I-29 exit 84
Mound City	6.801	10.945	US 59 (State Street)	
1.000 mi = 1.609 km; 1.000 km = 0.621 mi
