= Hickory Township, Holt County, Missouri =

Township in Holt County, Missouri, U.S.

Hickory Township
- Township
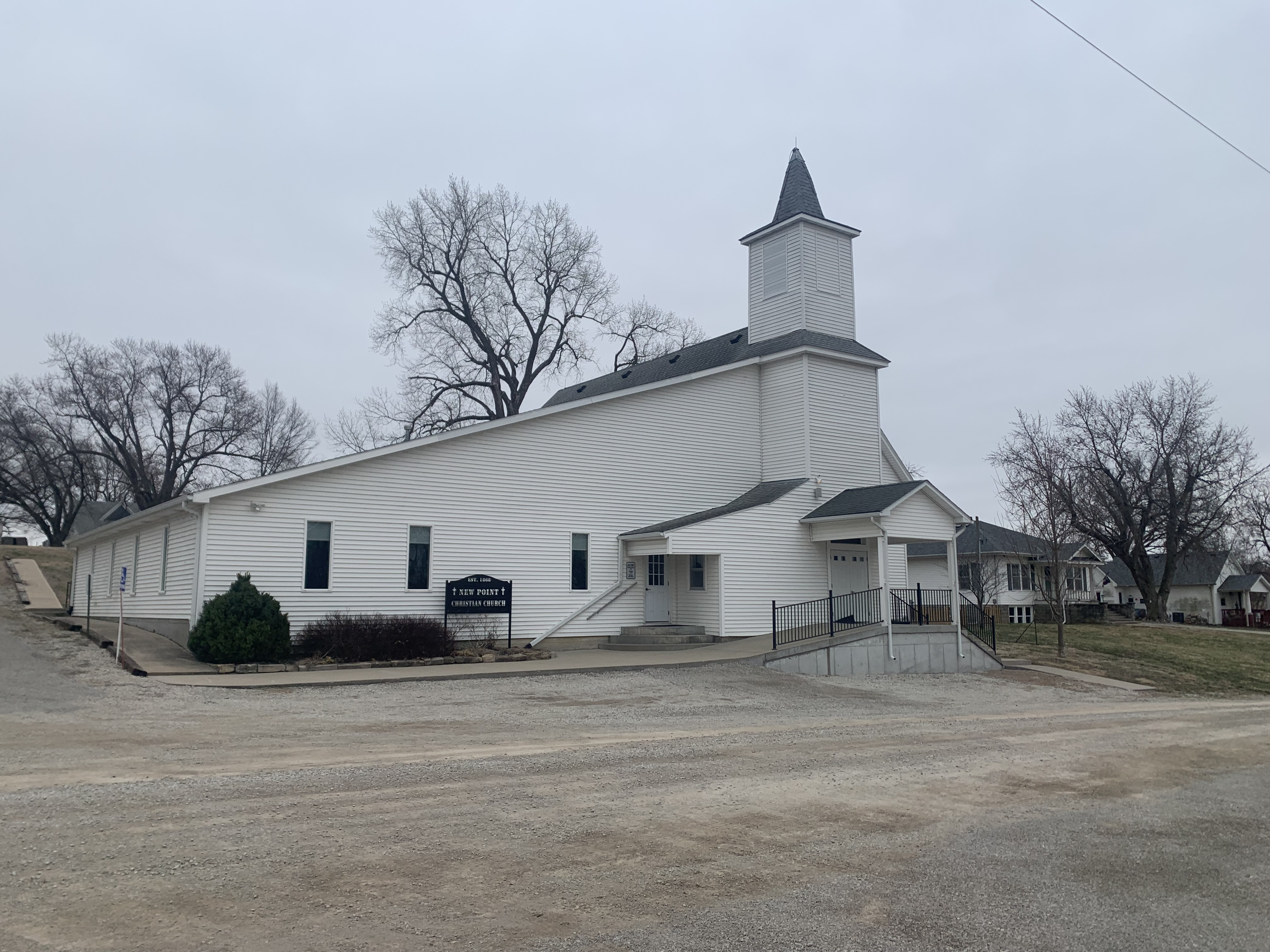
- New Point Christian Church in southern Hickory Township

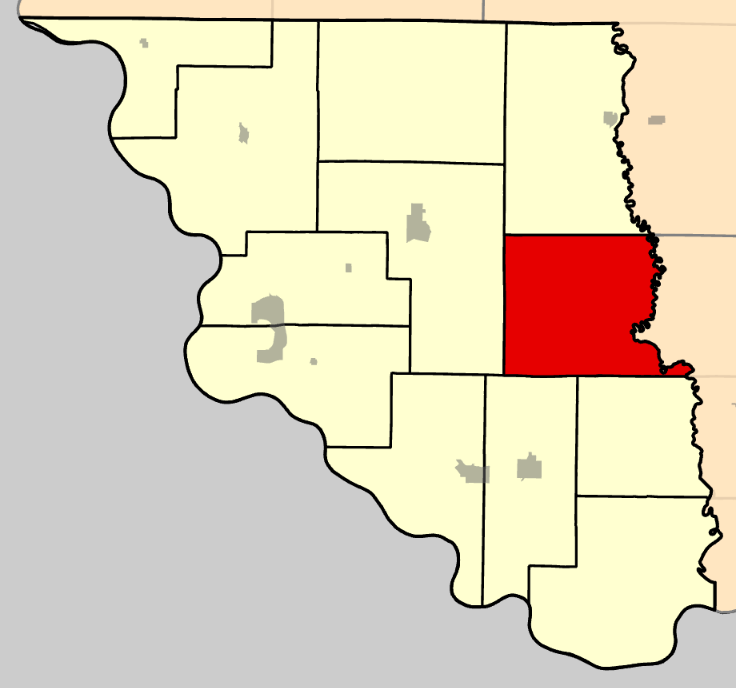
- Coordinates: 40°04′26″N 95°05′34″W
- Country: United States
- State: Missouri
- County: Holt

Area
  - Total: 39.0 sq mi (101 km^{2})
  - Land: 38.93 sq mi (100.8 km^{2})
  - Water: 0.07 sq mi (0.18 km^{2}) 0.18%
- Elevation: 925 ft (282 m)

Population (2020)
  - Total: 202
  - Density: 5.2/sq mi (2.0/km^{2})
- FIPS code: 29-08731852
- GNIS feature ID: 766766

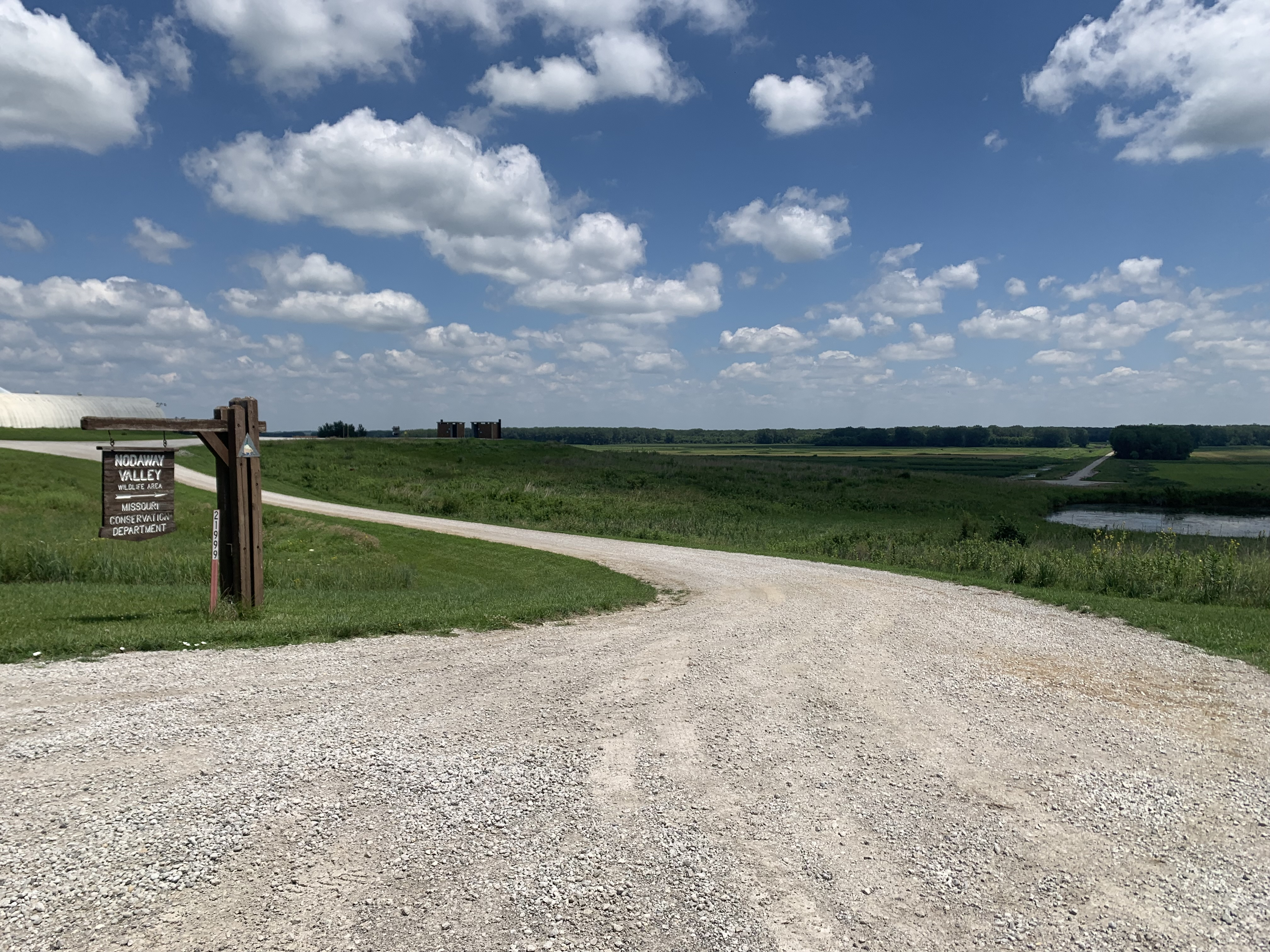
Nodaway Valley Conservation Area in Hickory Township

Hickory Township is a township in Holt County, Missouri, United States. At the 2020 census, its population was 202. It contains a little more than 40 square miles. New Point is located in its southeast and Nodaway Valley Conservation Area comprises much of its eastern boundary. The hamlet of Nichols Grove was the first settlement in the township.

Hickory Township was established on June 17, 1874, when it was created from the southern part of Clay Township and the northern part of Nodaway Township.

== Transportation ==
The following highways travel through the township:

- Interstate 29
- U.S. Route 59
- U.S. Route 159
- Route 113
- Route 120
- Route B
