= Clay Township, Holt County, Missouri =

Township in Holt County, Missouri, U.S.

Clay Township
- Township
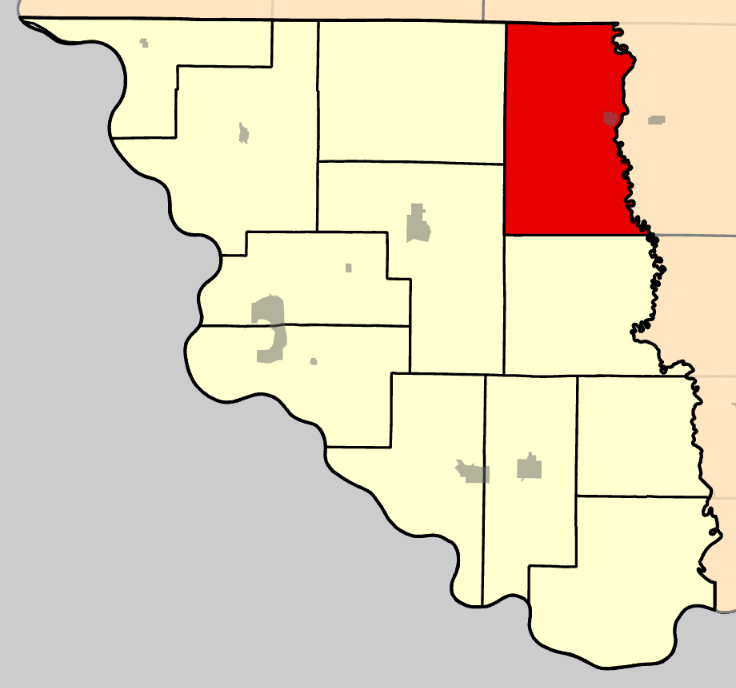
- Coordinates: 40°11′52″N 95°06′46″W
- Country: United States
- State: Missouri
- County: Holt

Area
  - Total: 46.61 sq mi (120.7 km^{2})
  - Land: 46.5 sq mi (120 km^{2})
  - Water: 0.11 sq mi (0.28 km^{2}) 0.24%
- Elevation: 915 ft (279 m)

Population (2020)
  - Total: 443
  - Density: 9.5/sq mi (3.7/km^{2})
- FIPS code: 29-08714410
- GNIS feature ID: 766763

Clay Township is a township in Holt County, Missouri, United States. At the 2020 census, its population was 443. It contains 46 square miles.

== History ==
Clay Township was predominately settled by Whigs and when it was organized in June 1854 it was named for the Whig leader, Henry Clay of Kentucky. Twenty years later, on June 20, 1874, it was reduced to its present limits due to the creation of Hickory Township from its southern portion.

== Geography ==
The Nodaway River comprises Clay Township's eastern border with neighboring Nodaway County and Maitland is situated alongside the river in the middle of the township. The hamlet, Kings Grove, was partially located in the northwest of the township. Whig Valley was a small community in the center of the township, but now is a term for the rolling hills west of the Nodaway River in northeastern Holt County.

A community called Dehornville was laid out and had lots advertised for it in 1891, which was located 2 miles north of Maitland. No evidence of the community exists today.

A place named Campbell Corner was located on the southern boundary of this township, five miles south of Maitland; today it is at the intersection of Route 113 and Route B.

== Transportation ==
The following highways travel through the township:

- U.S. Route 59
- Route 113
- Route A
- Route B
- Route C
- Route D
- Route HH
