= Napier, Missouri =

Extinct community in Missouri, U.S.

Napier
- Extinct community
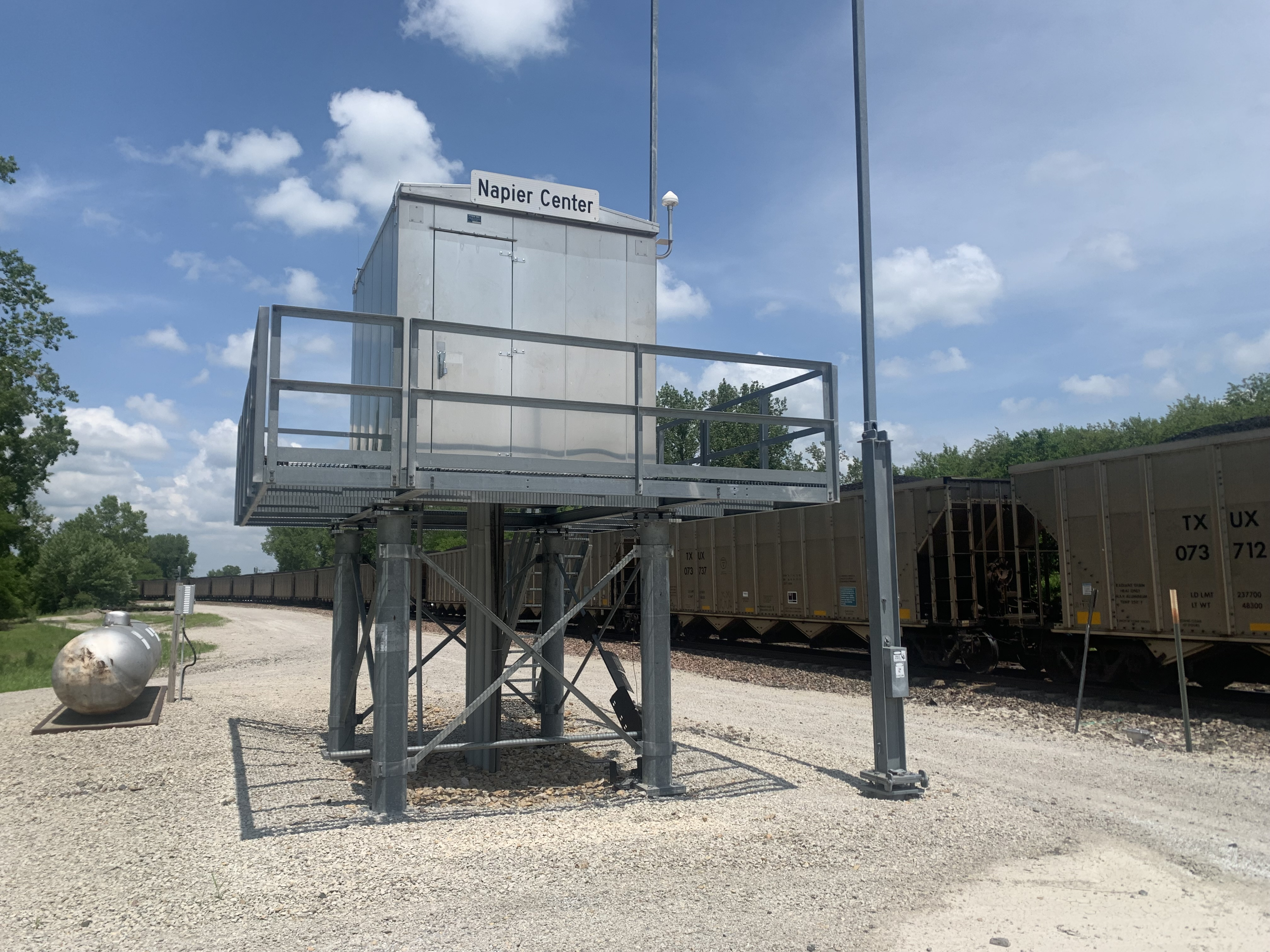
- Napier Center remote station on the BNSF railroad

- Location within the state of Missouri
- Coordinates: 40°02′56″N 95°15′28″W
- Country: United States
- State: Missouri
- County: Holt
- Township: Minton
- Founded: 1882
- Elevation: 850 ft (260 m)

Napier is an extinct community in Holt County, in the U.S. state of Missouri.

== History ==
Napier was established as a station on January 1, 1882, and named for a railroad promoter. In 1887, the St. Joseph and Nebraska Railroad was built from Napier west to the Missouri River across from Rulo, Nebraska. A post office called Banks was established in 1884; it was later called Napier in 1889. and remained in operation until 1943. In the early 20th Century, Napier boasted a hotel, an opera house, and a prominent train station in Holt County. On September 2, 1974, the train station was abandoned. The BNSF railroad still runs trains daily through Napier on the Napier Subdivision.

== Geography ==
Napier is located in the easternmost sections of Minton Township. It was the junction of two Chicago, Burlington, and Quincy railways: the Burlington and Missouri River Railroad, which traveled west beginning at Napier, and the Kansas City, St. Joseph, and Council Bluffs Railroad, which traveled northwesterly through the town. The Davis Creek Ditch passes by east of the settlement. It is located at the southwest corner of Loess Bluffs National Wildlife Refuge.
