= Missouri Route 120 =

State highway in Missouri, U.S.

Route 120
- MO 120 highlighted in red

Route information
- Maintained by MoDOT
- Length: 3.132 mi (5.040 km)

Major junctions
- West end: US 59 north of Oregon
- East end: Route B north of New Point

Location
- Country: United States
- State: Missouri

Highway system
- Missouri State Highway System; Interstate; US; State; Supplemental
← Route 119	→ Route 121

Route 120 is a short state highway in Holt County, Missouri. Its eastern terminus is at Route B about eight miles (13 km) northeast of Oregon. Its western terminus is at U.S. Route 59 about three miles (4.8 km) west of its eastern terminus. No towns are along the highway.

== Route description ==
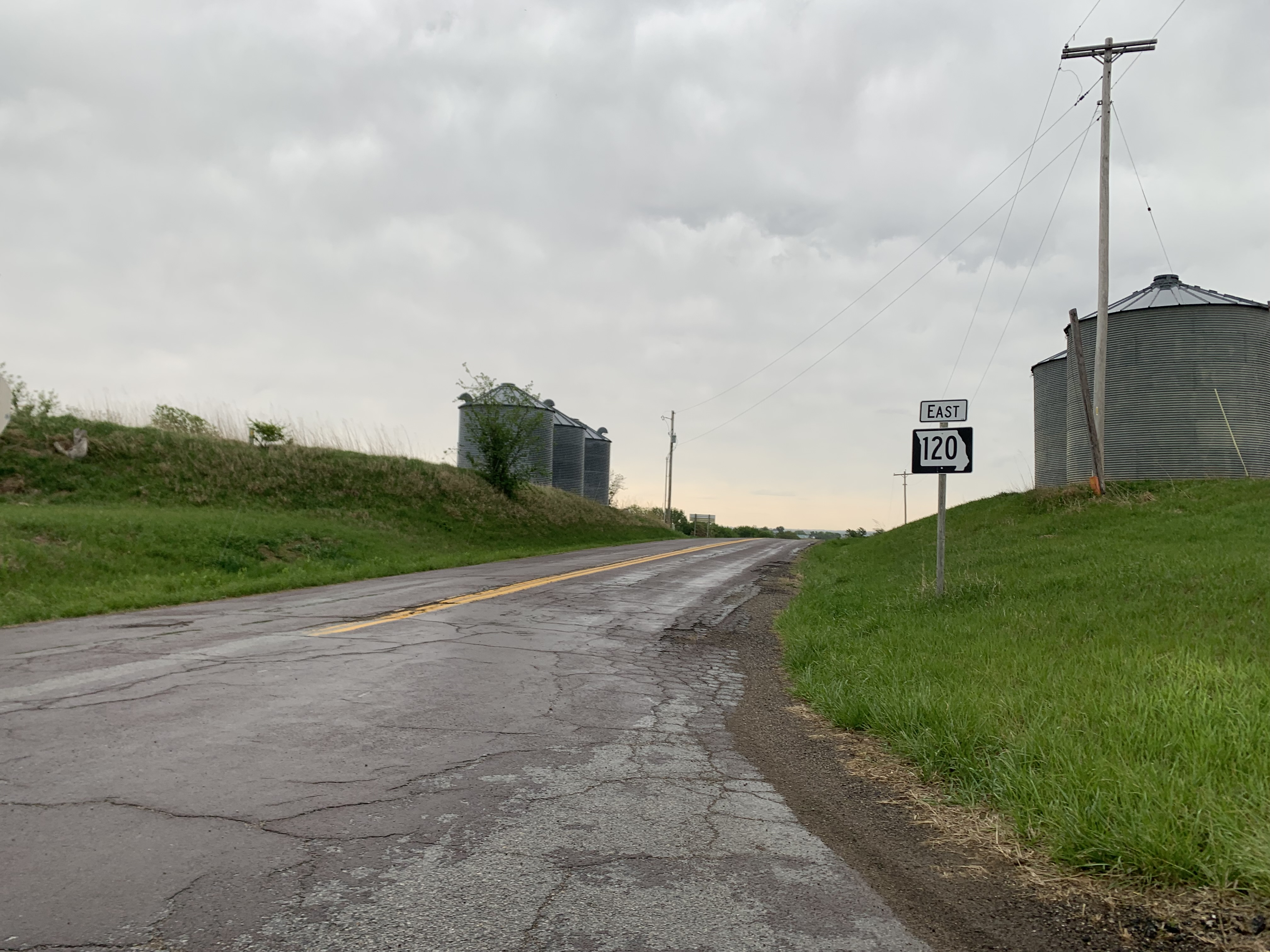
Western terminus of Route 120

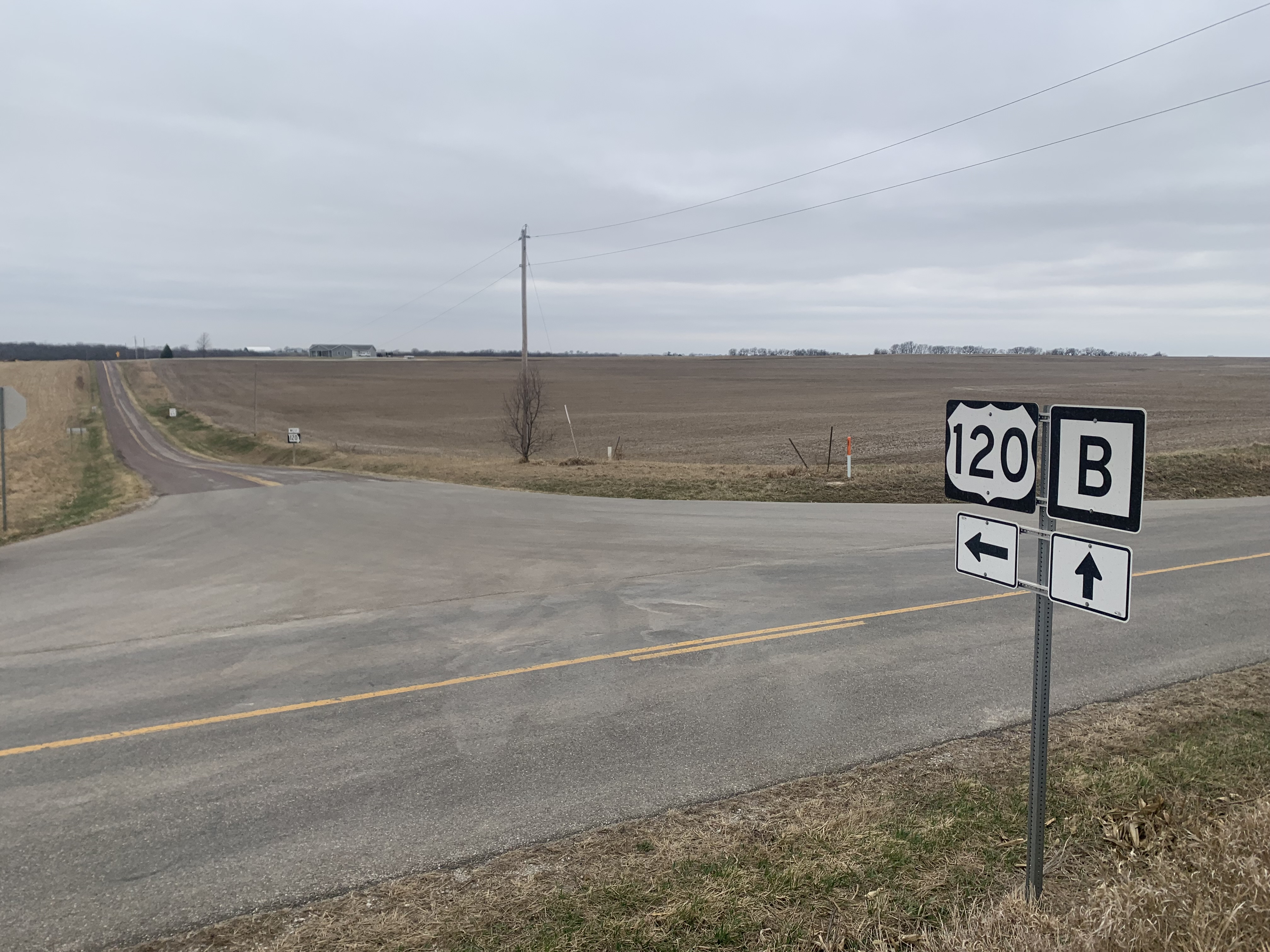
Missouri Route 120 eastern terminus just north of New Point, curiously with a U.S. Highway sign.

Route 120 begins at an intersection with US 59 north of Oregon, heading east on a two-lane undivided road. The route passes through agricultural land with some trees, curving to the southeast before heading east again. Route 120 comes to its eastern terminus at an intersection with Route B just north of New Point.

== History ==
What is now Route 120 began as a simple dirt road, resembling the current course of the present highway. Two schoolhouses and one cemetery were along the route at the end of the 19th Century. After the United States Postal Service began rural mail delivery from Oregon in 1901, Rural Free Delivery was provided west of New Point on a route called Oregon R.F.D. No. 1. This postal route was concurrent with the modern Route 120 for about 1.5 miles (2.4 km) in its middle portion. A 1924 map designated the entire route as Route 1-E; its western terminus being the newly designated Missouri Route 1

By 1930, the surface of the roadway was still not paved nor all weather, but the it did carry its present desgination of Route 120. In 1930, with its opening, U.S. Route 275 became the western terminus for Route 120. About five years later, U.S. Route 59 would become concurrent with US 275 in northwest Missouri, so both U.S. Highways were Route 120's western terminus. By 1941, the route was surfaced with gravel, and by 1957, the roadway was fully paved.

== Major intersections ==
The entire route is in Holt County.

Location	mi	km	Destinations	Notes
Hickory Township	0.000	0.000	US 59 – Mound City, Oregon	
Hickory Township	3.132	5.040	Route B – New Point	
1.000 mi = 1.609 km; 1.000 km = 0.621 mi
