= Liberty Township, Holt County, Missouri =

Township in Holt County, Missouri, U.S.

Liberty Township
- Township
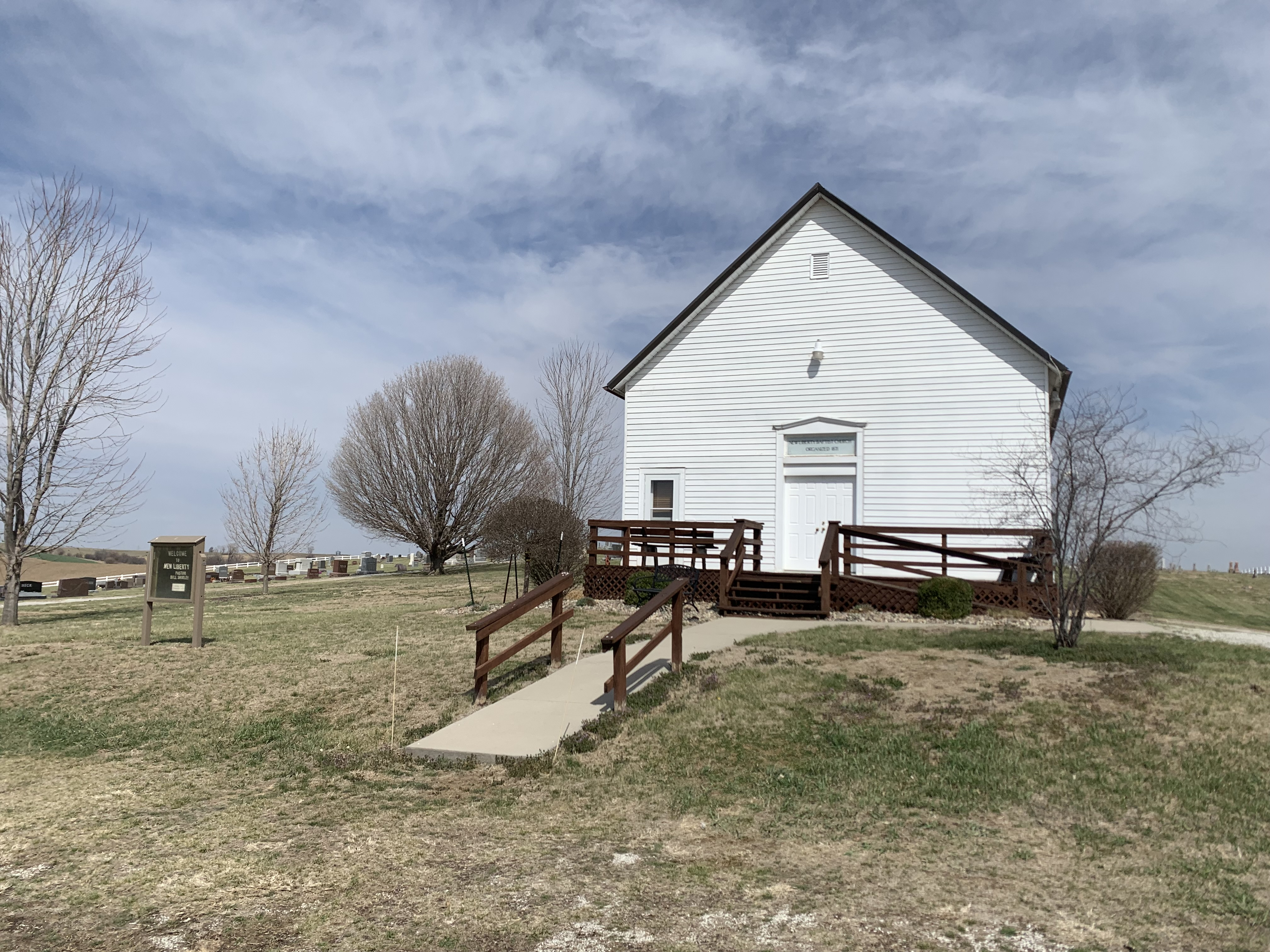
- New Liberty Church and Cemetery

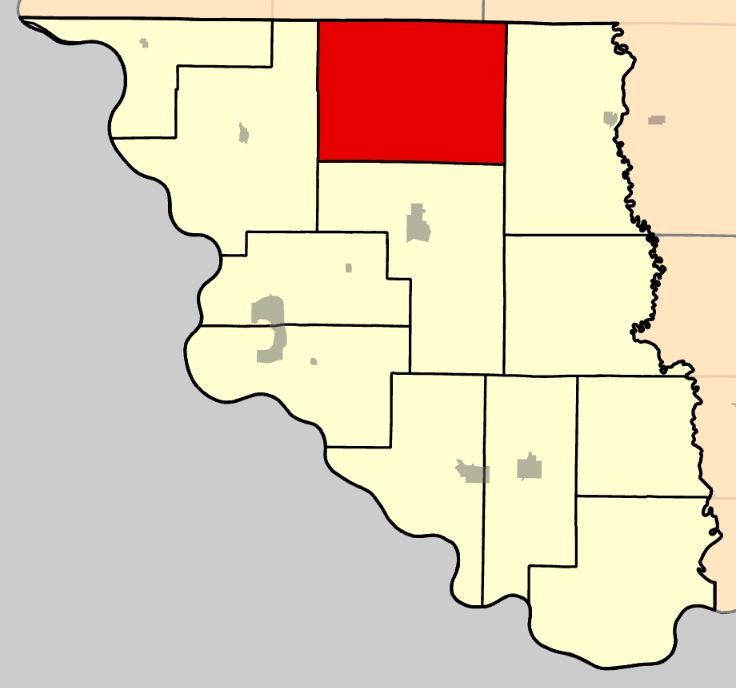
- Coordinates: 40°13′08″N 95°14′18″W
- Country: United States
- State: Missouri
- County: Holt

Area
  - Total: 48.26 sq mi (125.0 km^{2})
  - Land: 48.26 sq mi (125.0 km^{2})
  - Water: 0.0 sq mi (0 km^{2}) 0.0%
- Elevation: 958 ft (292 m)

Population (2020)
  - Total: 175
  - Density: 3.6/sq mi (1.4/km^{2})
- FIPS code: 29-08742140
- GNIS feature ID: 766768

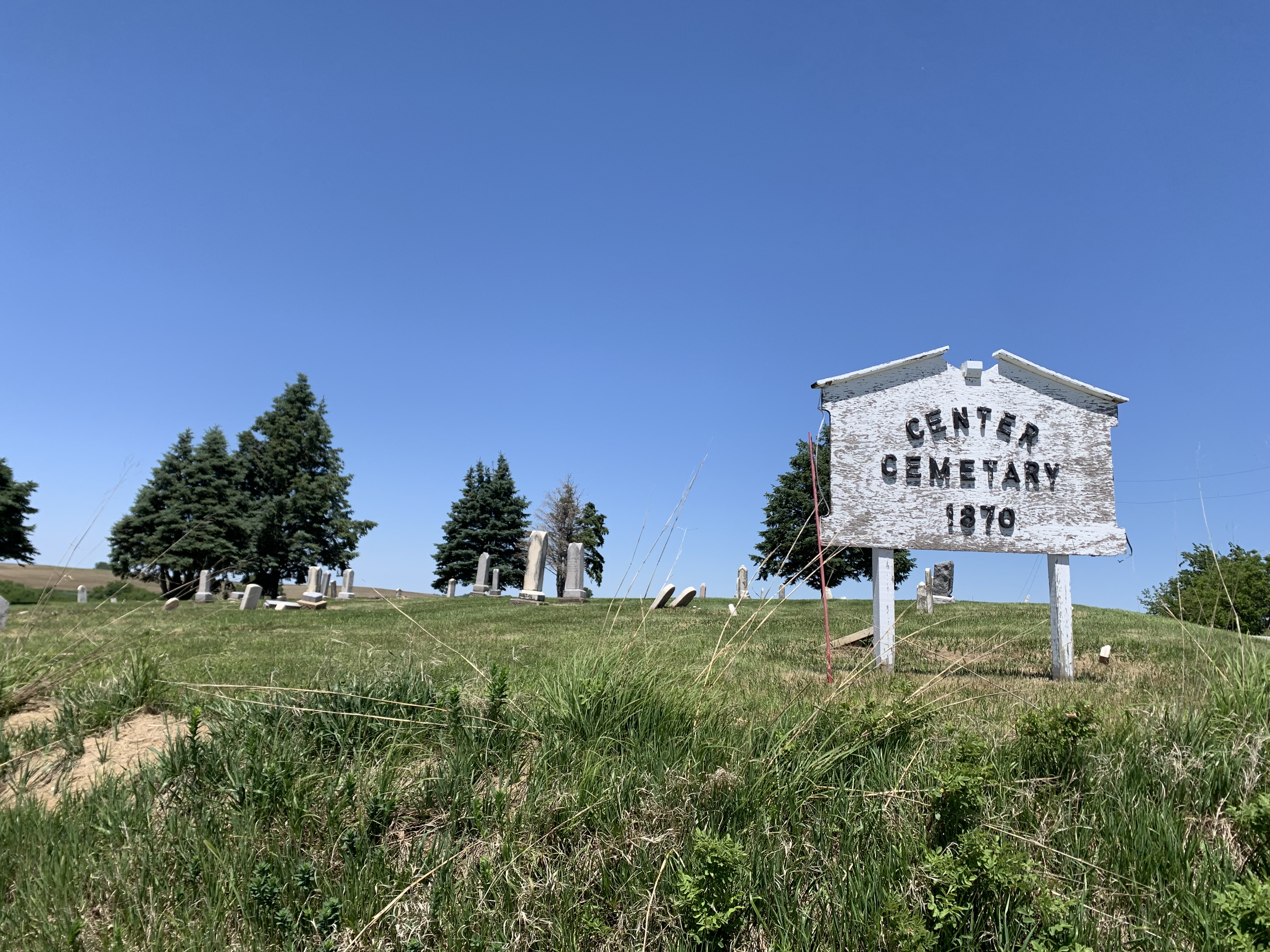
Center Cemetery in southeastern Liberty Township

Liberty Township is a township in Holt County, Missouri, United States. At the 2020 census, its population was 175. It contains 45 sections. There are no communities located within the township.

Liberty Township was established in 1874 and was created from part of Benton Township.

== Transportation ==
The following highways travel through the township:

- Interstate 29
- U.S. Route 59
- Route C
- Route DD
- Route HH
- Route N
