= Thorp Branch =

Stream in Missouri, U.S.

Coordinates: 39°57′29″N 95°07′29″W

Thorp Branch is a stream in Holt County in the U.S. state of Missouri.

Thorp Branch (also historically called "Thorp's Creek") has the name of William Thorp, the proprietor of a local watermill. Additionally, a post office was located on the creek from 1839-1841, the first in Holt County.

== See also ==
- List of rivers of Missouri
