= Missouri Route 117 =

State highway in Missouri, U.S.

Route 117
- MO 117 highlighted in red

Route information
- Maintained by MoDOT
- Length: 0.260 mi (418 m)

Major junctions
- South end: Indian Trail Conservation Area
- North end: Route 19 northeast of Salem

Location
- Country: United States
- State: Missouri

Highway system
- Missouri State Highway System; Interstate; US; State; Supplemental
← Route 116	→ Route 118

Route 117 is a short highway in Dent County. Its northern terminus is at Route 19 northeast of Salem; its southern terminus is in Indian Trail Conservation Area.

== Route description ==
Route 117 begins in the Indian Trail Conservation Area at an intersection with two park roads. The route heads northwest through areas of dense forest on a two-lane undivided road. Route 117 comes to its northern terminus at an intersection with Route 19 northeast of Salem. It is one of the only 2 highways in Missouri to be less than 1 mile. the other being Missouri Route 799 at 0.50 miles.

== Major intersections ==
The entire route is in Dent County.

Location	mi	km	Destinations	Notes
Indian Trail Conservation Area	0.000	0.000	Beginning of state maintenance	
	0.260	0.418	Route 19	
1.000 mi = 1.609 km; 1.000 km = 0.621 mi
