= Nichols Grove, Missouri =

Extinct hamlet in Missouri, U.S.

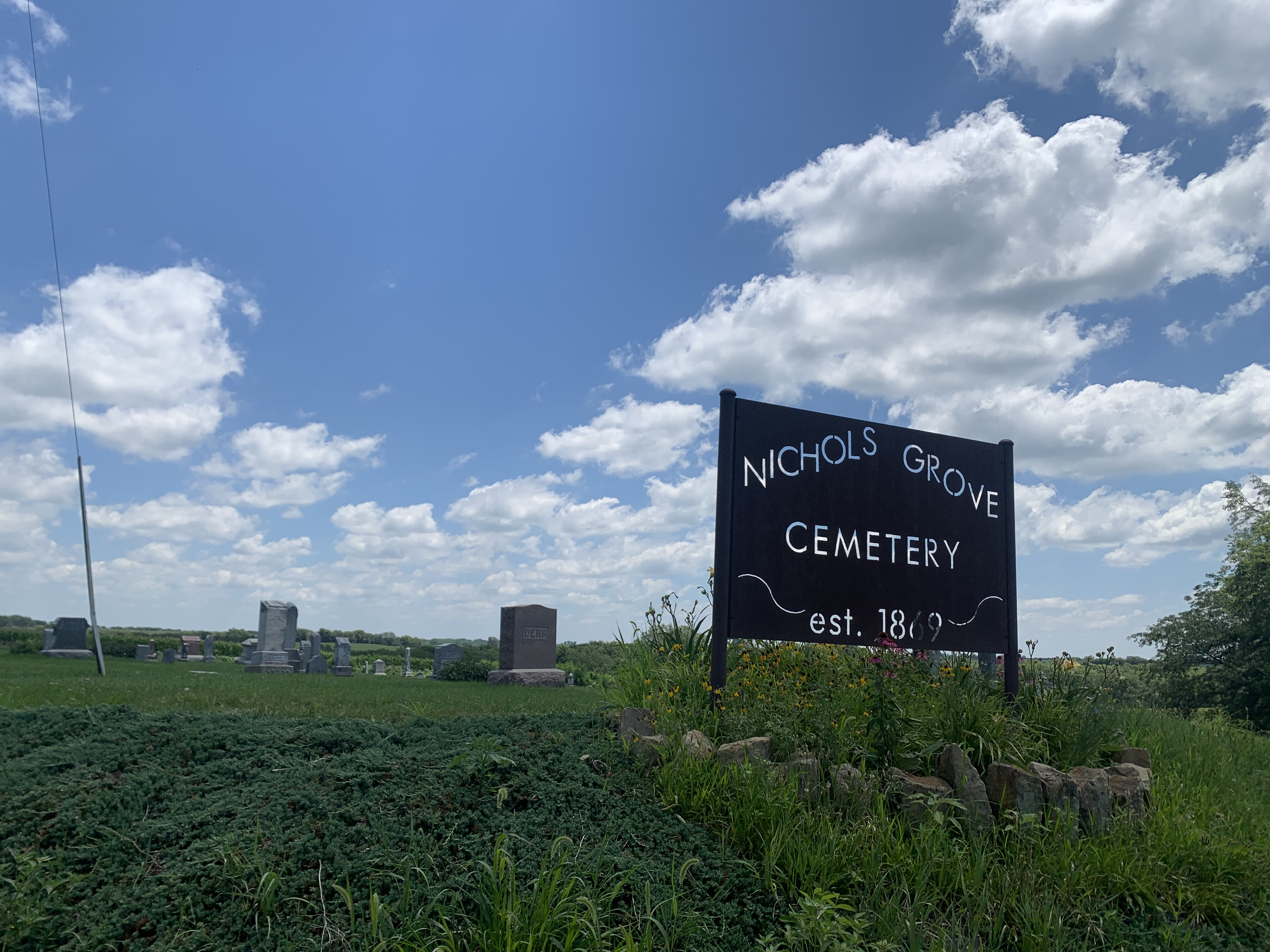
Nichols Grove Cemetery in Nodaway Township

Nichols Grove, also known as Nickols Grove or Nickell's Grove, is an extinct hamlet in Holt County, in the U.S. state of Missouri. It was first settled in 1838, making it the first settlement in Nodaway Township and perhaps one of the first in the northwestern portion of Missouri.

The community derives its name from the Nichol family of pioneer citizens.

The settlement was along Nickolls Creek, just south of New Point.
