= Fortescue, Missouri =

- Village
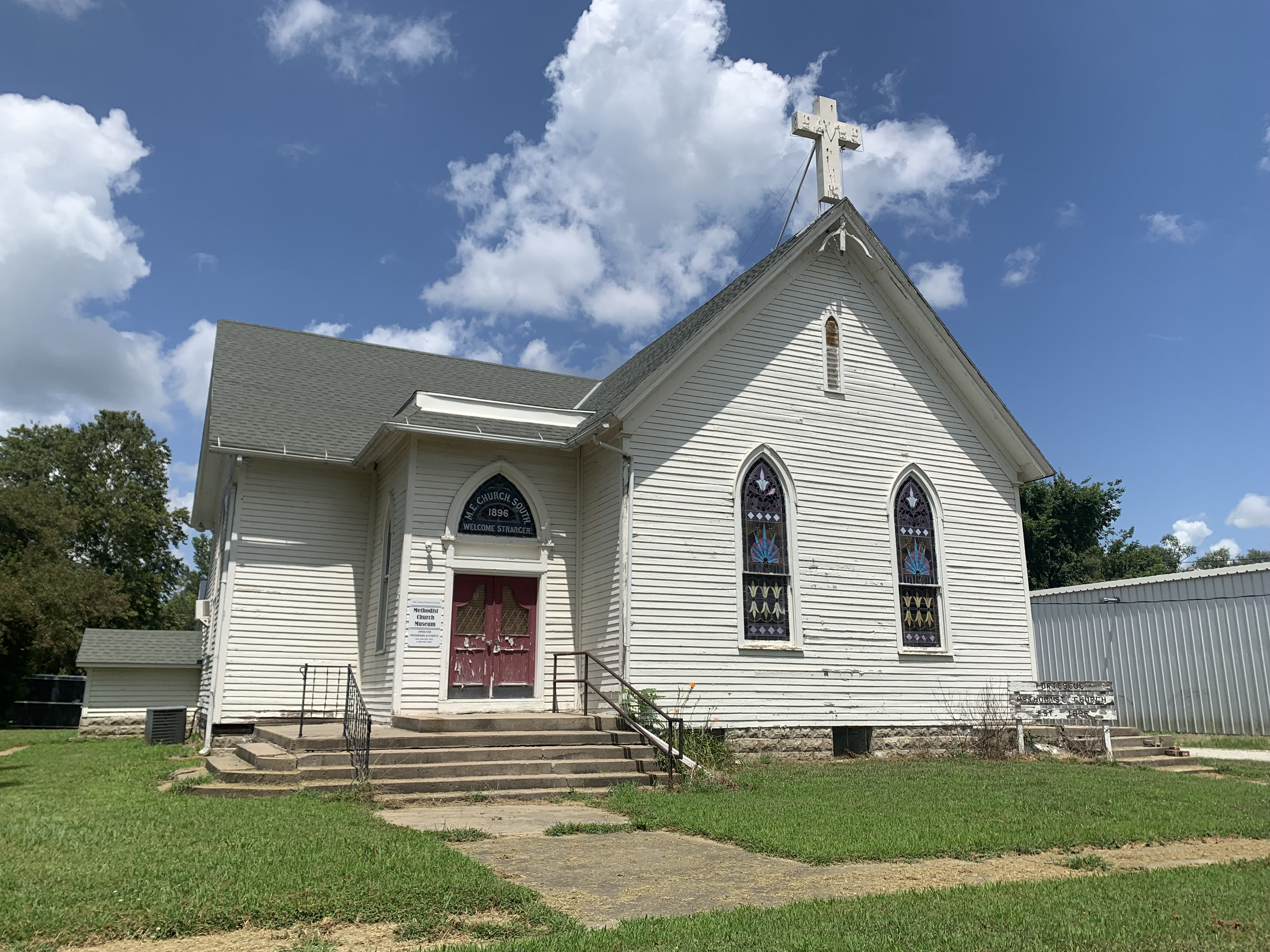
- Methodist Church in Fortescue

- Location of Fortescue, Missouri
- Coordinates: 40°03′07″N 95°19′03″W
- Country: United States
- State: Missouri
- County: Holt
- Township: Minton

Area
  - Total: 0.077 sq mi (0.20 km^{2})
  - Land: 0.077 sq mi (0.20 km^{2})
  - Water: 0 sq mi (0.00 km^{2})
- Elevation: 860 ft (260 m)

Population (2020)
  - Total: 21
  - Density: 272.3/sq mi (105.15/km^{2})
- Time zone: UTC-6 (Central (CST))
  - Summer (DST): UTC-5 (CDT)
- ZIP code: 64437
- Area code: 660
- FIPS code: 29-25228
- GNIS feature ID: 2396942

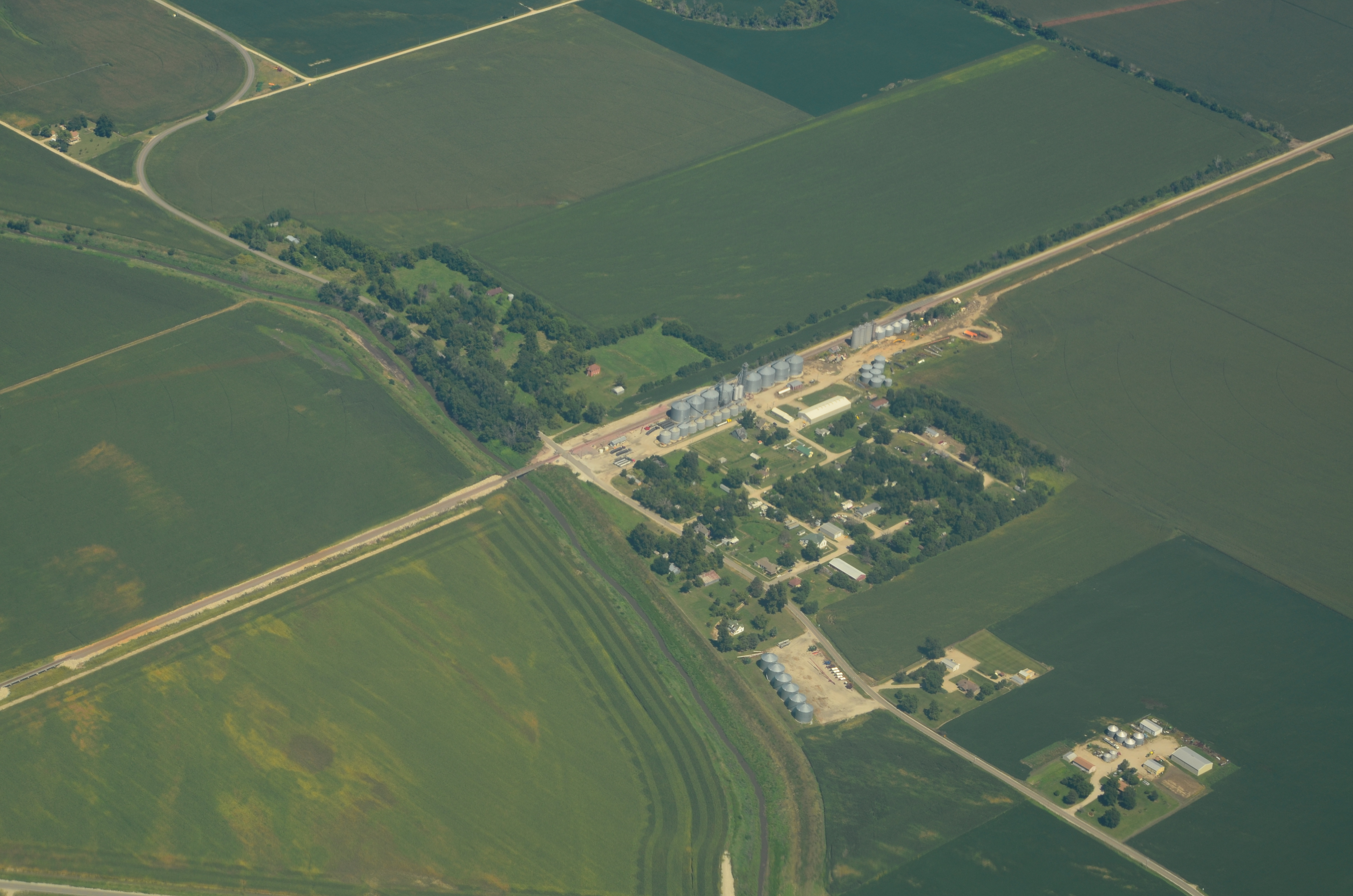
Aerial view of Fortescue, Missouri

Fortescue is a village in southwestern Holt County, Missouri, United States. The population was 21 at the 2020 census.

== History ==
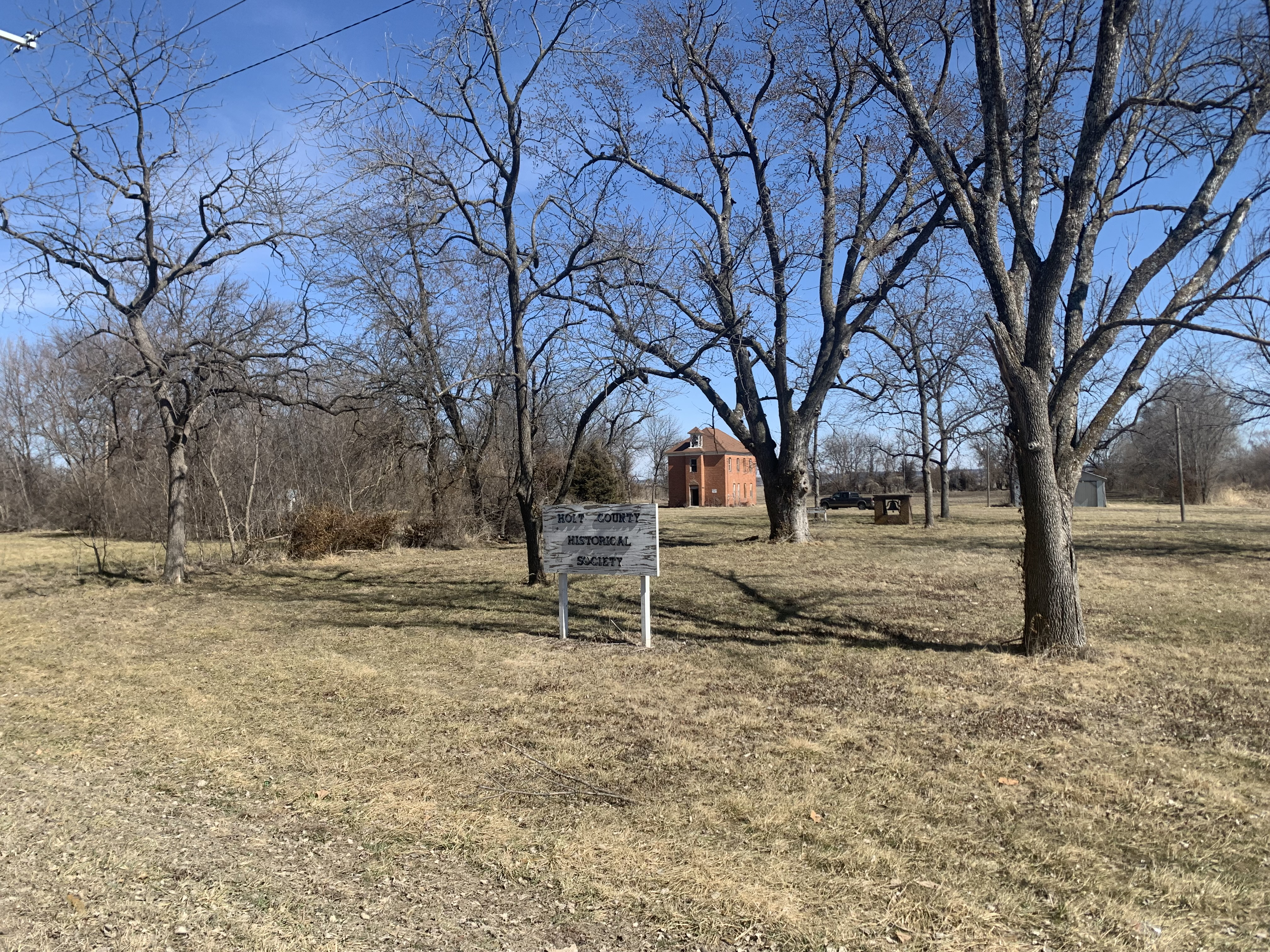
Holt County Historical Society park

Fortescue was founded in 1886 and had its plat filed on August 8, 1890. An early railroad promoter named Fortesque gave the community the maiden name of his mother. A post office called Fortescue was established in 1884, and remained in operation until 1973. Its location was at the juncture of the Burlington Missouri River Railroad and Big Tarkio Creek (now called Old Channel Tarkio Creek) and was platted as four blocks.

== Geography ==
According to the United States Census Bureau, the village has a total area of 0.08 square miles (0.21 km^{2}), all land. Fortescue is located 2.5 miles southeast of Big Lake, four miles southwest of Bigelow, and about 3.5 miles north of the Missouri, Kansas, and Nebraska trị-point. The village lies in the bottom lands of the Missouri River and is a few miles west of Loess Bluffs National Wildlife Refuge.

== Demographics ==
Historical population
Census	Pop.	Note	%±
1920	153		—
1930	141		−7.8%
1940	175		24.1%
1950	117		−33.1%
1960	78		−33.3%
1970	63		−19.2%
1980	51		−19.0%
1990	46		−9.8%
2000	51		10.9%
2010	32		−37.3%
2020	21		−34.4%
U.S. Decennial Census

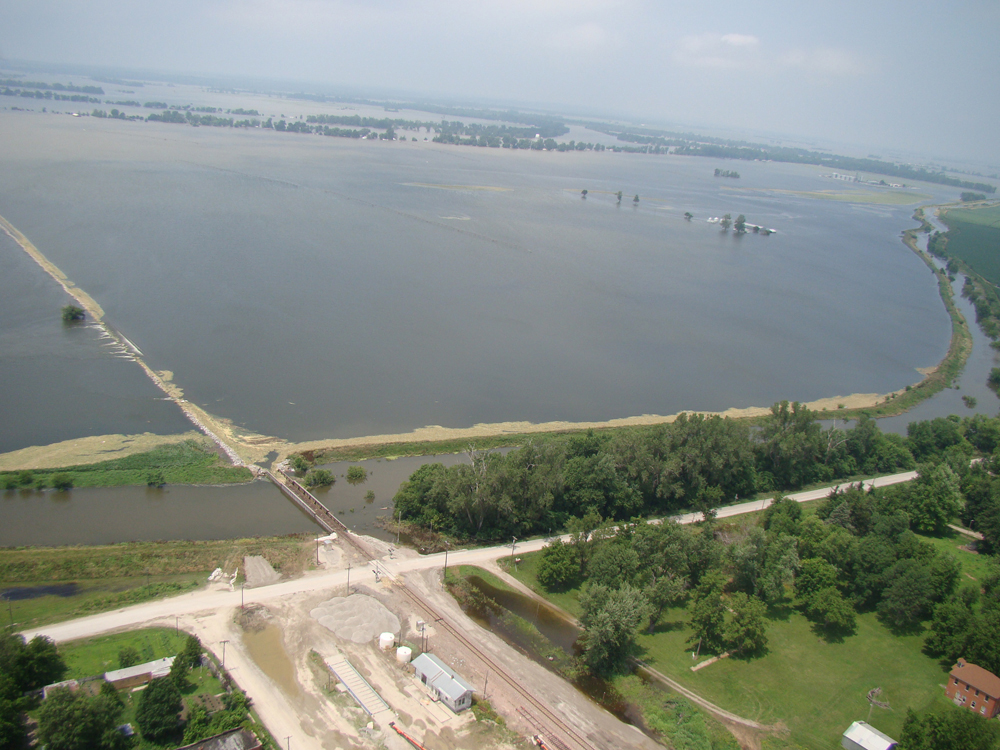
Looking west from Forstecue on June 26, 2011, in the midst of the 2011 Missouri River floods

=== 2010 census ===
As of the census of 2010, there were 32 people, 10 households, and 9 families living in the village. The population density was 400.0 inhabitants per square mile (154.4/km^{2}). There were 16 housing units at an average density of 200.0 per square mile (77.2/km^{2}). The racial makeup of the village was 100.0% White.

There were 10 households, of which 40.0% had children under the age of 18 living with them, 80.0% were married couples living together, 10.0% had a male householder with no wife present, and 10.0% were non-families. 0.0% of all households were made up of individuals. The average household size was 3.20 and the average family size was 3.33.

The median age in the village was 31 years. 34.4% of residents were under the age of 18; 6.3% were between the ages of 18 and 24; 28.2% were from 25 to 44; 28.2% were from 45 to 64; and 3.1% were 65 years of age or older. The gender makeup of the village was 43.8% male and 56.3% female.

=== 2000 census ===
As of the census of 2000, there were 51 people, 18 households, and 10 families living in the town. The population density was 674.1 inhabitants per square mile (260.3/km^{2}). There were 23 housing units at an average density of 304.0 per square mile (117.4/km^{2}). The racial makeup of the town was 100.00% White.

There were 18 households, out of which 61.1% had children under the age of 18 living with them, 44.4% were married couples living together, and 38.9% were non-families. 38.9% of all households were made up of individuals, and 11.1% had someone living alone who was 65 years of age or older. The average household size was 2.83 and the average family size was 3.82.

In the town the ages of the population were spread out, with 41.2% under the age of 18, 7.8% from 18 to 24, 35.3% from 25 to 44, 11.8% from 45 to 64, and 3.9% who were 65 years of age or older. The median age was 26 years. For every 100 females, there were 131.8 males. For every 100 females age 18 and over, there were 172.7 males.

The median income for a household in the town was $26,250, and the median income for a family was $28,125. Males had a median income of $33,125 versus $11,250 for females. The per capita income for the town was $5,695. There were 38.5% of families and 29.5% of the population living below the poverty line, including 21.4% of under eighteens and none of those over 64.
