= Holt County, Missouri =

County in Missouri, United States

- County
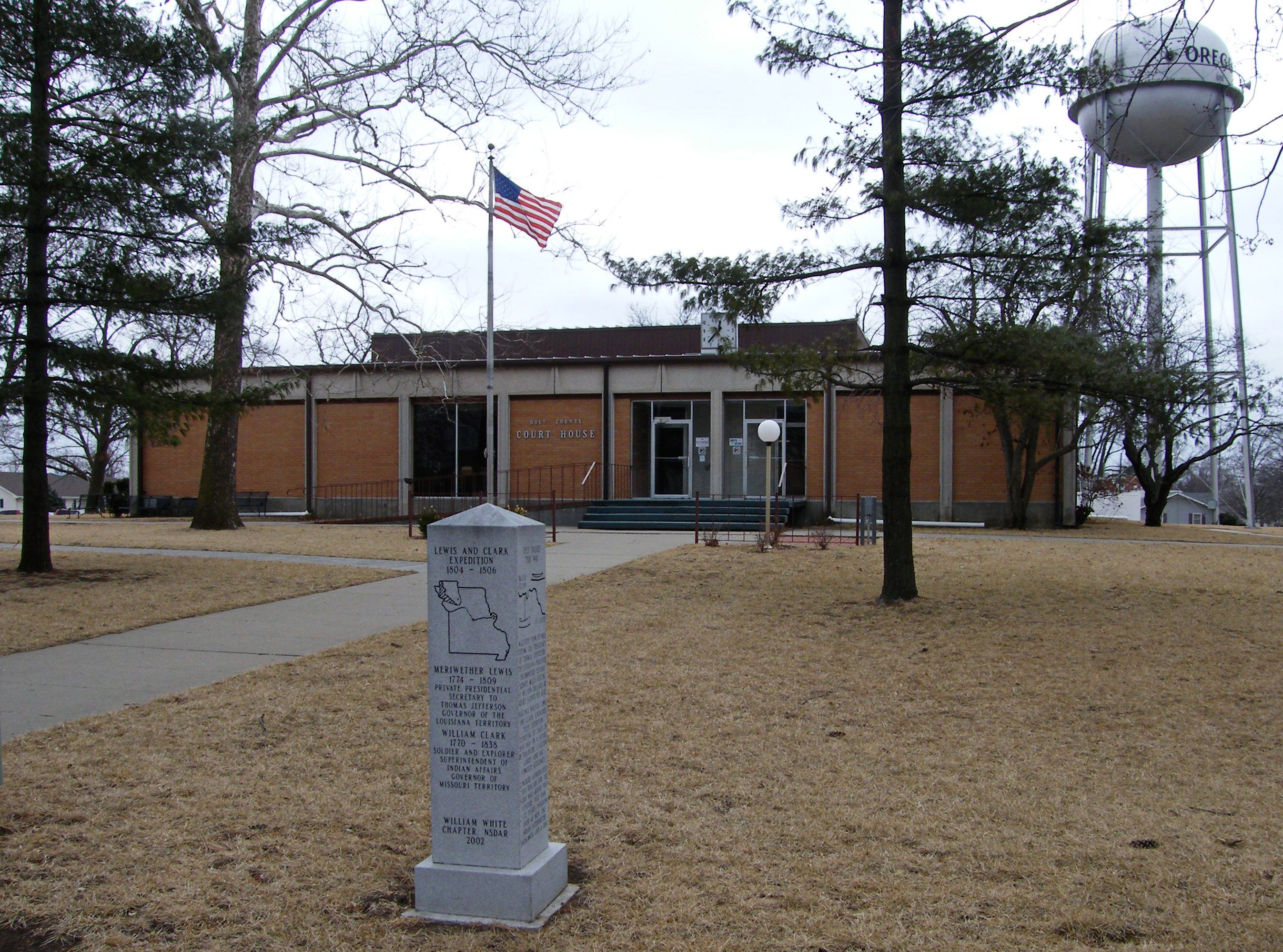
- Holt County Courthouse in Oregon

- Location within the U.S. state of Missouri
- Coordinates: 40°05′N 95°13′W
- Country: United States
- State: Missouri
- Founded: February 15, 1841
- Named for: David Rice Holt
- Seat: Oregon
- Largest city: Mound City

Area
  - Total: 470 sq mi (1,200 km^{2})
  - Land: 463 sq mi (1,200 km^{2})
  - Water: 7.7 sq mi (20 km^{2}) 1.6%

Population (2020)
  - Total: 4,223
  - Estimate (2025): 4,200 ▼
  - Density: 9.12/sq mi (3.52/km^{2})
- Time zone: UTC−6 (Central)
  - Summer (DST): UTC−5 (CDT)
- Congressional district: 6th
- Website: holtcountymo.gov

Holt County is a county located in the northwestern portion of the U.S. state of Missouri. As of the 2020 census, the population was 4,223. Its county seat is Oregon. The county was organized February 15, 1841. Originally named Nodaway County, it was soon renamed for David Rice Holt (1803–1840), a Missouri state legislator from Platte County.

== History ==
The original area of Holt County was much larger than its present area. When it was first organized it comprised the current Holt County boundary, all of Atchison County, that part of Nodaway County west of the Nodaway River, and the aforementioned claim extended ten miles north into southwestern Iowa; an area more than 1,350 square miles in all.

The first Post Office in Holt County opened in 1839 and was located on Thorp's Creek near Oregon. It was known as Thorp's Mill and closed in 1841.

In 1972, the Holt County Historical Society was established.

Holt County was impacted by the 2019 Midwestern U.S. floods. About 30,000 acres (12,000 hectares) of the 95,000 acres (38,000 hectares) that flooded in spring 2019 were still underwater in late October. Some of the floodwater was expected to freeze in place over the winter.

== Geography ==
According to the U.S. Census Bureau, the county has a total area of 470 square miles (1,200 km^{2}), of which 463 square miles (1,200 km^{2}) is land and 7.7 square miles (20 km^{2}) (1.6%) is water.

=== Adjacent counties ===
- Atchison County (north)
- Nodaway County (northeast)
- Andrew County (southeast)
- Doniphan County, Kansas (south)
- Brown County, Kansas (southwest)
- Richardson County, Nebraska (west)
- Nemaha County, Nebraska (northwest)

=== Major highways ===
The following highways travel through the county:

- Interstate 29
- U.S. Route 59
- U.S. Route 159
- Route 111
- Route 113
- Route 118
- Route 120

== Demographics ==
Historical population
Census	Pop.	Note	%±
1850	3,957		—
1860	6,550		65.5%
1870	11,652		77.9%
1880	15,509		33.1%
1890	15,469		−0.3%
1900	17,083		10.4%
1910	14,539		−14.9%
1920	14,084		−3.1%
1930	12,720		−9.7%
1940	12,476		−1.9%
1950	9,833		−21.2%
1960	7,885		−19.8%
1970	6,654		−15.6%
1980	6,882		3.4%
1990	6,034		−12.3%
2000	5,351		−11.3%
2010	4,912		−8.2%
2020	4,223		−14.0%
2025 (est.)	4,200	▼	−0.5%
U.S. Decennial Census; 1790-1960 1900-1990; 1990-2000 2010-2015

=== 2020 census ===
As of the 2020 census, the county had a population of 4,223. The median age was 48.4 years. 21.6% of residents were under the age of 18 and 25.6% of residents were 65 years of age or older. For every 100 females there were 93.7 males, and for every 100 females age 18 and over there were 95.6 males age 18 and over.

The racial makeup of the county was 94.8% White, 0.2% Black or African American, 0.8% American Indian and Alaska Native, 0.0% Asian, 0.0% Native Hawaiian and Pacific Islander, 0.8% from some other race, and 3.4% from two or more races. Hispanic or Latino residents of any race comprised 1.6% of the population.

0.0% of residents lived in urban areas, while 100.0% lived in rural areas.

There were 1,795 households in the county, of which 27.3% had children under the age of 18 living with them and 21.5% had a female householder with no spouse or partner present. About 28.3% of all households were made up of individuals and 14.6% had someone living alone who was 65 years of age or older.

=== Racial and ethnic composition ===
Holt County, Missouri – Racial and ethnic composition Note: the US Census treats Hispanic/Latino as an ethnic category. This table excludes Latinos from the racial categories and assigns them to a separate category. Hispanics/Latinos may be of any race.
Race / Ethnicity (NH = Non-Hispanic)	Pop 1980	Pop 1990	Pop 2000	Pop 2010	Pop 2020	% 1980	% 1990	% 2000	% 2010	% 2020
White alone (NH)	6,806	5,982	5,255	4,775	3,992	98.90%	99.14%	98.21%	97.21%	94.53%
Black or African American alone (NH)	5	7	5	7	4	0.07%	0.12%	0.09%	0.14%	0.09%
Native American or Alaska Native alone (NH)	28	22	25	48	30	0.41%	0.36%	0.47%	0.98%	0.71%
Asian alone (NH)	11	5	4	15	2	0.16%	0.08%	0.07%	0.31%	0.05%
Native Hawaiian or Pacific Islander alone (NH)	x	x	1	1	0	x	x	0.02%	0.02%	0.00%
Other race alone (NH)	11	2	0	3	18	0.16%	0.03%	0.00%	0.06%	0.43%
Mixed race or Multiracial (NH)	x	x	40	24	110	x	x	0.75%	0.49%	2.60%
Hispanic or Latino (any race)	21	16	21	39	67	0.31%	0.27%	0.39%	0.79%	1.59%
Total	6,882	6,034	5,351	4,912	4,223	100.00%	100.00%	100.00%	100.00%	100.00%

=== 2000 census ===
As of the census of 2000, there were 5,351 people, 2,237 households, and 1,503 families residing in the county. The population density was 12 people per square mile (4.6 people/km^{2}). There were 2,931 housing units at an average density of 6 units per square mile (2.3/km^{2}). The racial makeup of the county was 98.47% White, 0.11% Black or African American, 0.47% Native American, 0.07% Asian, 0.02% Pacific Islander, 0.11% from other races, and 0.75% from two or more races. Approximately 0.39% of the population were Hispanic or Latino of any race.

There were 2,237 households, out of which 28.20% had children under the age of 18 living with them, 57.30% were married couples living together, 6.10% had a female householder with no husband present, and 32.80% were non-families. 29.70% of all households were made up of individuals, and 16.70% had someone living alone who was 65 years of age or older. The average household size was 2.35 and the average family size was 2.91.

In the county, the population was spread out, with 23.80% under the age of 18, 6.50% from 18 to 24, 24.40% from 25 to 44, 23.90% from 45 to 64, and 21.50% who were 65 years of age or older. The median age was 42 years. For every 100 females there were 97.70 males. For every 100 females age 18 and over, there were 92.80 males.

The median income for a household in the county was $29,461, and the median income for a family was $35,685. Males had a median income of $26,966 versus $17,846 for females. The per capita income for the county was $15,876. About 10.50% of families and 13.00% of the population were below the poverty line, including 15.90% of those under age 18 and 11.90% of those age 65 or over.

== Education ==
School districts include:

- Craig R-III School District
- Mound City R-II School District
- Nodaway-Holt R-VII School District
- South Holt County R-I School District

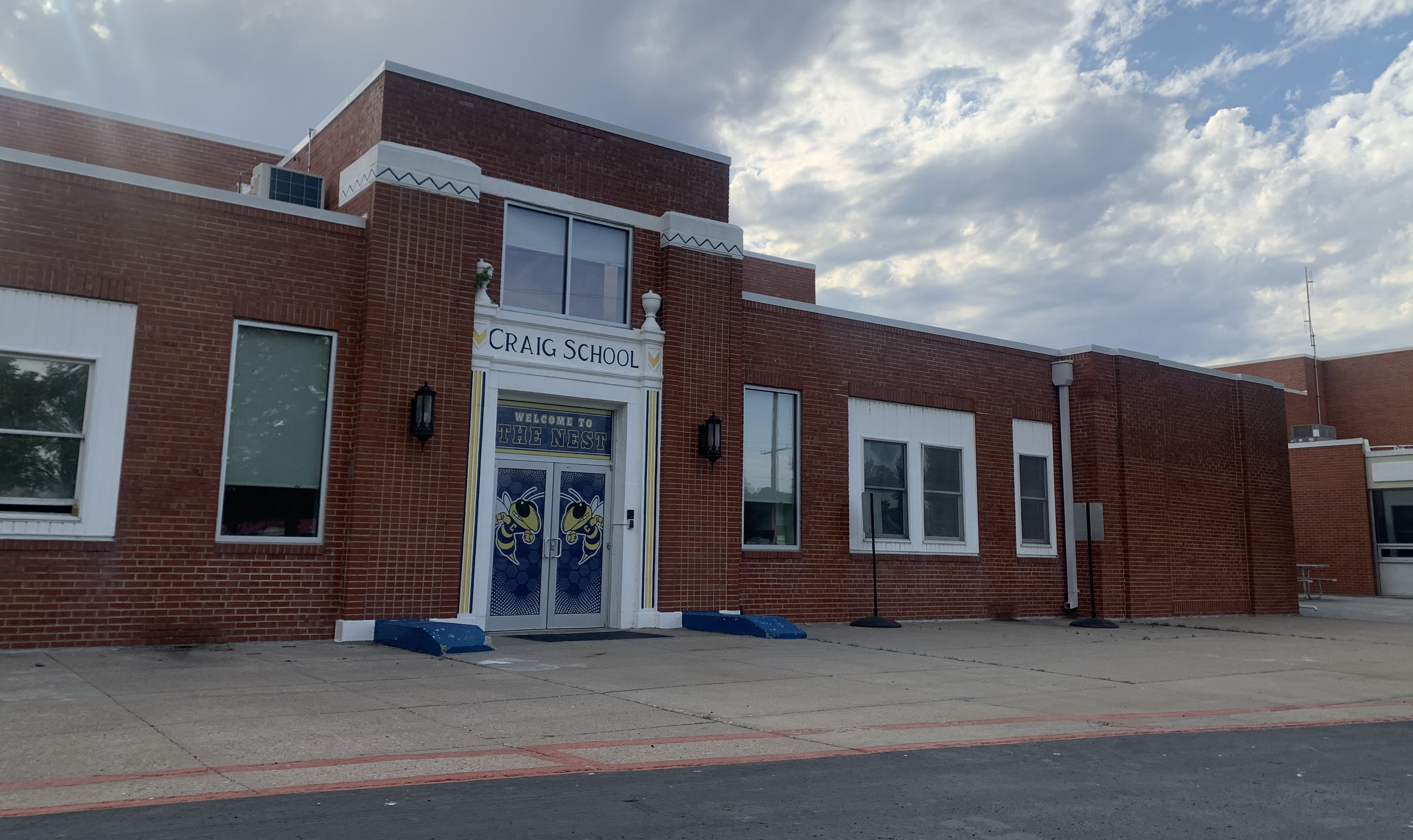
Craig R-III School in Craig, Missouri

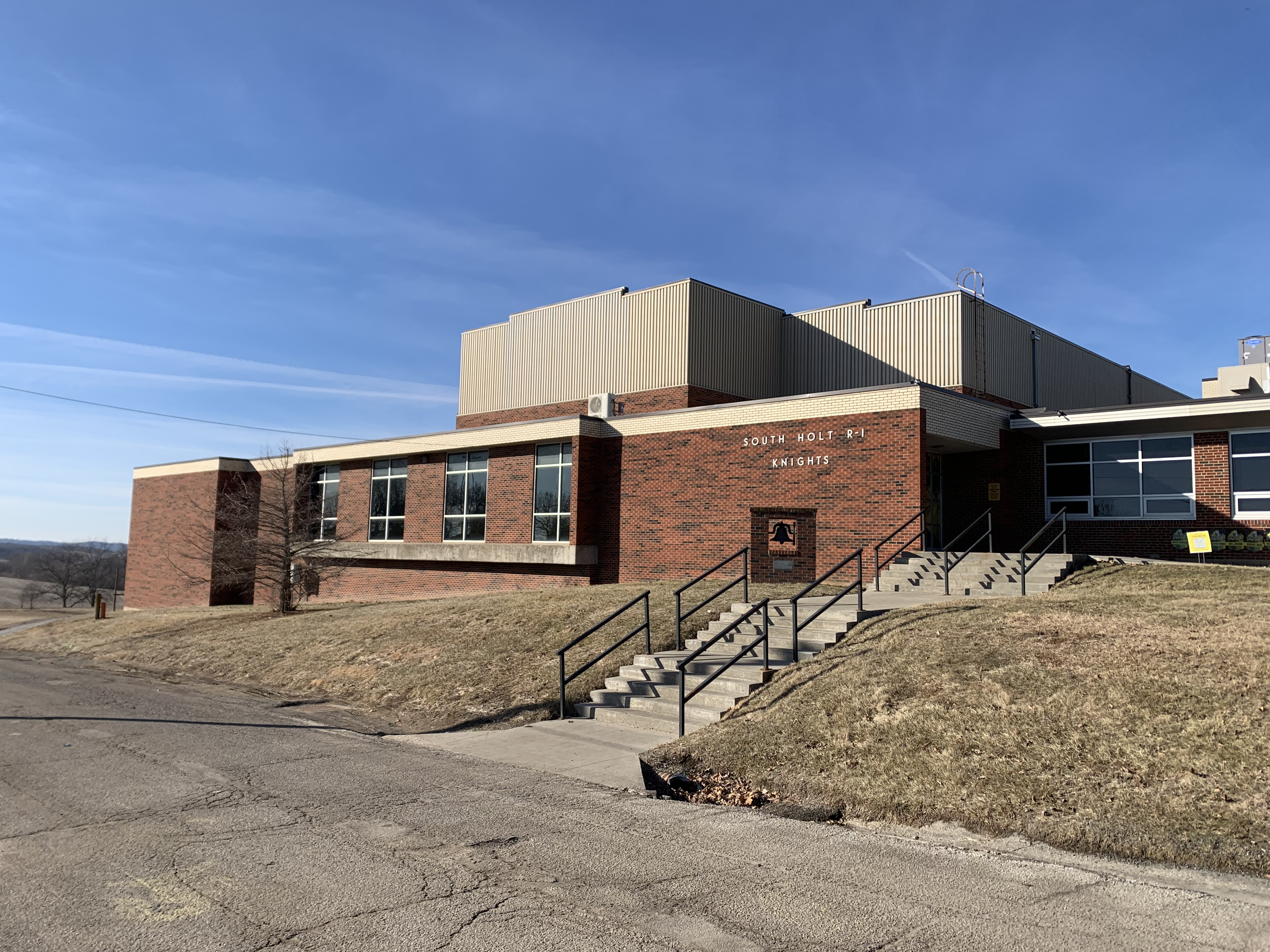
South Holt R-I School in Oregon, Missouri

=== Public schools ===
- Craig R-III School District – Craig
  - Craig Elementary School (K-06)
  - Craig High School (07-12)
- Mound City R-II School District – Mound City
  - Mound City Elementary School (PK-04)
  - Mound City Middle School (05-08)
  - Mound City High School (09-12)
- Nodaway-Holt R-VII School District – Maitland and Graham
  - Nodaway-Holt Elementary School (K-06)
  - Nodaway-Holt High School (07-12)
- South Holt County R-I School District – Oregon
  - South Holt County Elementary School (K-06)
  - South Holt County High School (07-12)

=== Public libraries ===
- Mound City Public Library
- Oregon Public Library

== Points of interest ==
- Loess Bluffs National Wildlife Refuge (formerly Squaw Creek)
- Big Lake State Park on Big Lake
- St. John's Evangelical Lutheran Church in Corning, Missouri

== Communities ==
=== Cities ===
- Craig
- Forest City
- Maitland
- Mound City
- Oregon (county seat)

=== Villages ===
- Big Lake
- Bigelow
- Fortescue

=== Townships ===
- Benton
- Bigelow
- Clay
- Forbes
- Forest
- Hickory
- Lewis
- Liberty
- Lincoln
- Minton
- Nodaway
- Union

=== Unincorporated communities ===
- Forbes
- New Point

=== Extinct communities ===
- Corning
- Curzon
- Kings Grove
- Napier
- Nichols Grove
- Richville
- Whig Valley

=== Population ranking ===
The population ranking of the following table is based on the 2020 census of Holt County.

† county seat

Rank	Name	Municipal Type	Population
1	Mound City	4th Class City	1,004
2	Oregon †	4th Class City	837
3	Maitland	4th Class City	276
4	Forest City	4th Class City	243
5	Craig	4th Class City	105
6	Big Lake	Village	65
7	Fortescue	Village	21
8	Bigelow	Village	5
9	Corning	Village	3

== Notable people ==
- Frank McGrath - actor, born in Mound City in 1903
- Charles C. Moore - 13th governor of Idaho; born in Holt County.
- Roger Wehrli - NFL athlete inducted into the Hall of Fame, born in New Point

== Politics ==
=== Local ===
The Republican Party predominantly controls politics at the local level in Holt County. Republicans hold all but one of the elected positions in the county.

Holt County, Missouri

Elected countywide officials
Assessor	LaDonna Jones	Republican
Circuit Clerk	Vicki Book	Republican
County Clerk	Angie Gamache	Republican
Collector	Donna Cotton	Republican
Commissioner (presiding)	Mark Sitherwood	Republican
Commissioner (district 1)	Carla Markt	Republican
Commissioner (district 2)	David Carroll	Republican
Coroner	Susan Lentz	Republican
Prosecuting Attorney	Robert Shepherd	Republican
Public Administrator	Velvet Sommer	Republican
Recorder	Vicki Book	Republican
Sheriff	Steve Portman	Independent
Surveyor	Joshua Cook	Republican
Treasurer	Gay Quick	Republican

=== State ===
Past Gubernatorial Elections Results
Year	Republican	Democratic	Third Parties
2024	83.16% 1,921	14.81% 342	2.04% 47
2020	82.64% 1,928	15.47% 361	1.89% 44
2016	64.66% 1,515	32.14% 753	3.20% 75
2012	56.40% 1,296	41.60% 956	2.00% 46
2008	55.75% 1,440	40.53% 1,047	3.72% 96
2004	66.34% 1,776	32.61% 873	1.05% 28
2000	59.14% 1,563	39.01% 1,031	1.85% 49
1996	36.65% 1,040	61.63% 1,749	1.73% 49

All of Holt County is a part of Missouri's 1st District in the Missouri House of Representatives and is represented by Allen Andrews (R-Grant City).

Missouri House of Representatives — District 1 — Holt County (2016)
Party	Candidate	Votes	%	±%
Republican	Allen Andrews	2,133	100.00%	+14.61

Missouri House of Representatives — District 1 — Holt County (2014)
Party	Candidate	Votes	%	±%
Republican	Allen Andrews	1,075	85.39%	−14.61
Democratic	Robert L. Ritterbusch	184	14.61%	+14.61

Missouri House of Representatives — District 1 — Holt County (2012)
Party	Candidate	Votes	%	±%
Republican	Mike Thomson	2,152	100.00%	

All of Holt County is a part of Missouri's 12th District in the Missouri Senate and is currently represented by Dan Hegeman (R-Cosby).

Missouri Senate - District 12 – Holt County (2010)
Party	Candidate	Votes	%	±%
Republican	Dan Hageman	1,120	100.00%	

=== Federal ===
U.S. Senate — Missouri — Holt County (2016)
Party	Candidate	Votes	%	±%
Republican	Roy Blunt	1,614	69.18%	+17.84
Democratic	Jason Kander	629	26.96%	−15.16
Libertarian	Jonathan Dine	54	2.31%	−4.23
Green	Johnathan McFarland	23	0.99%	+0.99
Constitution	Fred Ryman	13	0.56%	+0.56

U.S. Senate — Missouri — Holt County (2012)
Party	Candidate	Votes	%	±%
Republican	Todd Akin	1,139	51.34%	
Democratic	Claire McCaskill	959	42.12%	
Libertarian	Jonathan Dine	149	6.54%	

All of Holt County is included in Missouri's 6th Congressional District and is currently represented by Sam Graves (R-Tarkio) in the U.S. House of Representatives.

U.S. House of Representatives — Missouri's 6th Congressional District — Holt County (2016)
Party	Candidate	Votes	%	±%
Republican	Sam Graves	1,921	82.98%	+5.11
Democratic	David M. Blackwell	331	14.30%	−3.46
Libertarian	Russ Lee Monchil	44	1.90%	−2.46
Green	Mike Diel	19	0.82%	+0.82

U.S. House of Representatives — Missouri’s 6th Congressional District — Holt County (2014)
Party	Candidate	Votes	%	±%
Republican	Sam Graves	982	77.87%	−3.20
Democratic	Bill Hedge	224	17.76%	+0.53
Libertarian	Russ Lee Monchil	55	4.36%	+2.66

U.S. House of Representatives — Missouri's 6th Congressional District — Holt County (2012)
Party	Candidate	Votes	%	±%
Republican	Sam Graves	1,863	81.07%	
Democratic	Kyle Yarber	396	17.23%	
Libertarian	Russ Lee Monchil	39	1.70%	

=== Political culture ===
United States presidential election results for Holt County, Missouri
Year	Republican		Democratic		Third party(ies)	
Year	No.	%	No.	%	No.	%
1888	1,831	54.00%	1,433	42.26%	127	3.75%
1892	1,899	51.58%	1,427	38.76%	356	9.67%
1896	2,397	53.44%	2,036	45.40%	52	1.16%
1900	2,292	54.91%	1,765	42.29%	117	2.80%
1904	2,208	61.47%	1,277	35.55%	107	2.98%
1908	2,246	57.62%	1,596	40.94%	56	1.44%
1912	1,522	41.22%	1,519	41.14%	651	17.63%
1916	2,030	55.01%	1,615	43.77%	45	1.22%
1920	4,153	63.35%	2,329	35.52%	74	1.13%
1924	3,316	57.98%	2,255	39.43%	148	2.59%
1928	3,845	66.57%	1,919	33.22%	12	0.21%
1932	2,253	41.77%	3,117	57.79%	24	0.44%
1936	3,409	52.45%	3,076	47.33%	14	0.22%
1940	3,739	58.22%	2,677	41.68%	6	0.09%
1944	3,152	63.73%	1,785	36.09%	9	0.18%
1948	2,607	56.05%	2,040	43.86%	4	0.09%
1952	3,476	69.73%	1,487	29.83%	22	0.44%
1956	2,888	62.77%	1,713	37.23%	0	0.00%
1960	2,720	63.69%	1,551	36.31%	0	0.00%
1964	1,726	47.98%	1,871	52.02%	0	0.00%
1968	2,031	56.09%	1,211	33.44%	379	10.47%
1972	2,578	71.83%	1,011	28.17%	0	0.00%
1976	1,777	53.56%	1,529	46.08%	12	0.36%
1980	1,993	62.48%	1,119	35.08%	78	2.45%
1984	2,087	67.04%	1,026	32.96%	0	0.00%
1988	1,583	55.54%	1,258	44.14%	9	0.32%
1992	1,202	39.49%	1,050	34.49%	792	26.02%
1996	1,323	47.15%	1,144	40.77%	339	12.08%
2000	1,738	65.29%	871	32.72%	53	1.99%
2004	1,864	69.27%	811	30.14%	16	0.59%
2008	1,794	68.14%	802	30.46%	37	1.41%
2012	1,725	74.68%	551	23.85%	34	1.47%
2016	1,926	81.78%	347	14.73%	82	3.48%
2020	1,976	84.34%	338	14.43%	29	1.24%
2024	1,982	84.27%	357	15.18%	13	0.55%

=== Missouri presidential preference primary (2008) ===
U.S. Senator and former First Lady Hillary Clinton (D-New York) received more votes, a total of 283, than any candidate from either party in Holt County during the 2008 presidential primary.

== See also ==
- National Register of Historic Places listings in Holt County, Missouri
