= Benton Township, Holt County, Missouri =

Township in Holt County, Missouri, U.S.

Benton Township
- Township
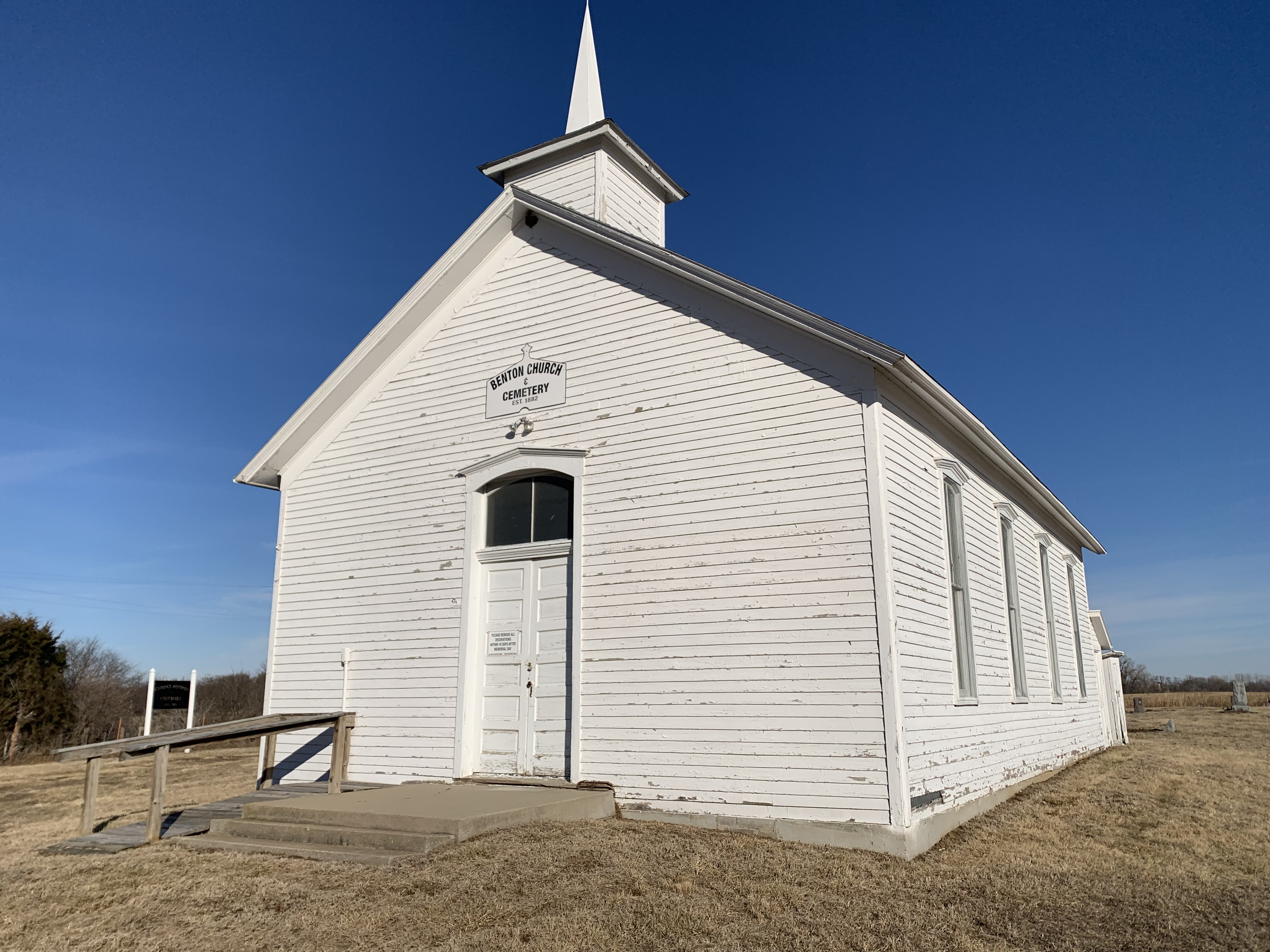
- Benton Church and Cemetery

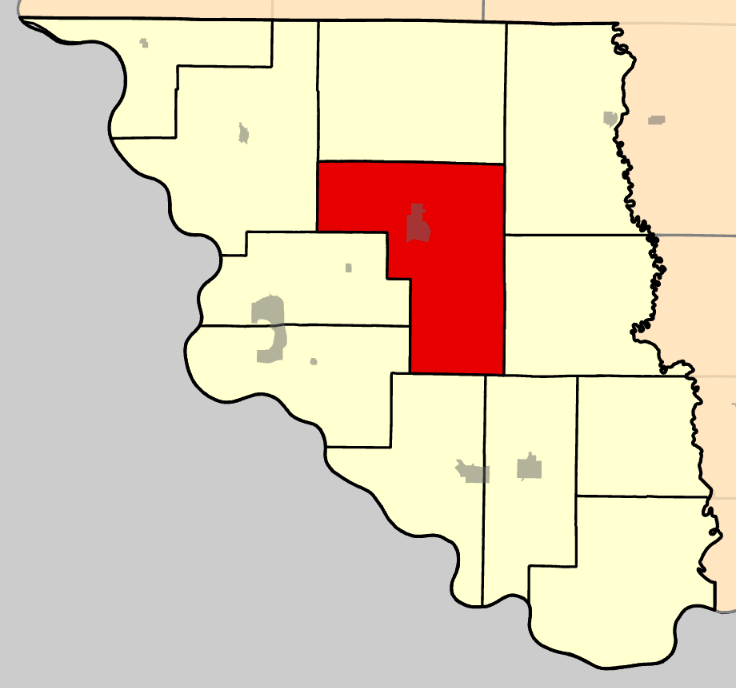
- Coordinates: 40°06′39″N 95°12′18″W
- Country: United States
- State: Missouri
- County: Holt

Area
  - Total: 50.18 sq mi (130.0 km^{2})
  - Land: 49.82 sq mi (129.0 km^{2})
  - Water: 0.36 sq mi (0.93 km^{2}) 0.72%
- Elevation: 981 ft (299 m)

Population (2020)
  - Total: 1,294
  - Density: 26/sq mi (10/km^{2})
- FIPS code: 29-08704672
- GNIS feature ID: 766761

Benton Township is a township in Holt County, Missouri, United States. At the 2020 census, its population was 1294. It contains about 50 sections. Mound City is the principal city of this township and is located in its center and the extinct hamlet of Jackson Point was located just south.

== History ==
The first white settler in Benton Township was John Blair who settled in 1839. was The present boundaries of Benton Township were set when neighboring Lincoln Township was organized on June 17, 1874. There have been three post offices in this township: Jackson Point, which operated from 1850 to 1854, then North Point, which operated from 1855 to 1871, then in 1871 it was renamed Mound City. The Kansas City, St. Joseph, and Council Bluffs Railroad was completed through this township in 1869.

== Transportation ==
The following highways travel through the township:

- Interstate 29
- U.S. Route 59
- U.S. Route 159
- Route 118
- Route BB
- Route C
- Route E
- Route F
- Route HH
- Route N
