= Bigelow, Missouri =

- Village
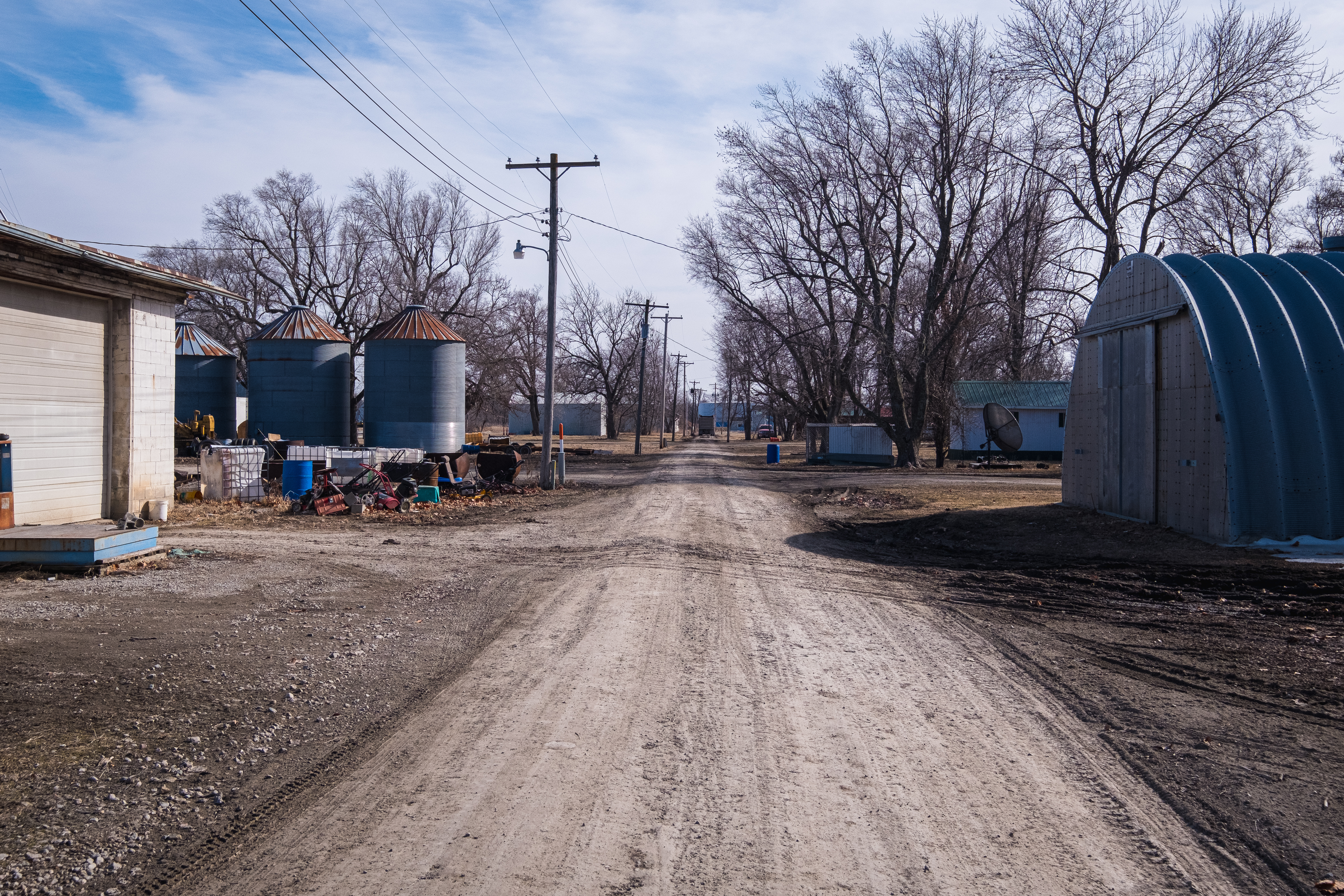

- Location of Bigelow, Missouri
- Coordinates: 40°06′37″N 95°17′22″W
- Country: United States
- State: Missouri
- County: Holt
- Township: Bigelow

Area
  - Total: 0.097 sq mi (0.25 km^{2})
  - Land: 0.097 sq mi (0.25 km^{2})
  - Water: 0 sq mi (0.00 km^{2})
- Elevation: 860 ft (260 m)

Population (2020)
  - Total: 5
  - Density: 52.2/sq mi (20.15/km^{2})
- Time zone: UTC-6 (Central (CST))
  - Summer (DST): UTC-5 (CDT)
- ZIP code: 64437
- Area code: 660
- FIPS code: 29-05464
- GNIS feature ID: 2398120

Bigelow is a village in western Holt County, Missouri, United States. The population was 5 at the 2020 census.

== History ==
The town of Bigelow, originally called Petersburg, started in August, 1868 when Captain H. L. Williams opened a store along the Burlington Railroad. A post office called Bigelow was established in 1869, and remained in operation until 1992. The village was named after a railroad promoter.

== Geography ==
According to the United States Census Bureau, the village has a total area of 0.09 square miles (0.23 km^{2}), all land. Bigelow sits near the northwest corner of the Loess Bluffs National Wildlife Refuge and is in the Missouri River Valley It is about three miles southwest of Mound City and four miles northeast of Fortescue.

== Demographics ==
Historical population
Census	Pop.	Note	%±
1880	190		—
1900	195		—
1910	156		−20.0%
1920	161		3.2%
1930	138		−14.3%
1940	143		3.6%
1950	132		−7.7%
1960	100		−24.2%
1970	84		−16.0%
1980	67		−20.2%
1990	32		−52.2%
2000	38		18.8%
2010	27		−28.9%
2020	5		−81.5%
U.S. Decennial Census

=== 2010 census ===
As of the census of 2010, there were 27 people, 12 households, and 6 families residing in the village. The population density was 300.0 inhabitants per square mile (115.8/km^{2}). There were 22 housing units at an average density of 244.4 per square mile (94.4/km^{2}). The racial makeup of the village was 100.0% White.

There were 12 households, of which 25.0% had children under the age of 18 living with them, 33.3% were married couples living together, 16.7% had a female householder with no husband present, and 50.0% were non-families. 41.7% of all households were made up of individuals, and 16.6% had someone living alone who was 65 years of age or older. The average household size was 2.25 and the average family size was 3.17.

The median age in the village was 33.8 years. 29.6% of residents were under the age of 18; 7.4% were between the ages of 18 and 24; 22.2% were from 25 to 44; 11.1% were from 45 to 64; and 29.6% were 65 years of age or older. The gender makeup of the village was 51.9% male and 48.1% female.

=== 2000 census ===
As of the census of 2000, there were 38 people, 16 households, and 12 families residing in the village. The population density was 415.9 inhabitants per square mile (160.6/km^{2}). There were 26 housing units at an average density of 284.6 per square mile (109.9/km^{2}). The racial makeup of the village was 100.00% White.

There were 16 households, out of which 18.8% had children under the age of 18 living with them, 50.0% were married couples living together, 25.0% had a female householder with no husband present, and 25.0% were non-families. 25.0% of all households were made up of individuals, and 12.5% had someone living alone who was 65 years of age or older. The average household size was 2.38 and the average family size was 2.83.

In the village, the population was spread out, with 28.9% under the age of 18, 2.6% from 18 to 24, 10.5% from 25 to 44, 18.4% from 45 to 64, and 39.5% who were 65 years of age or older. The median age was 60 years. For every 100 females, there were 123.5 males. For every 100 females age 18 and over, there were 80.0 males.

The median income for a household in the village was $23,750, and the median income for a family was $26,250. Males had a median income of $26,250 versus $10,000 for females. The per capita income for the village was $13,067. There were 12.5% of families and 31.0% of the population living below the poverty line, including 100.0% of under eighteens and none of those over 64.
