= Maitland, Missouri =

- City
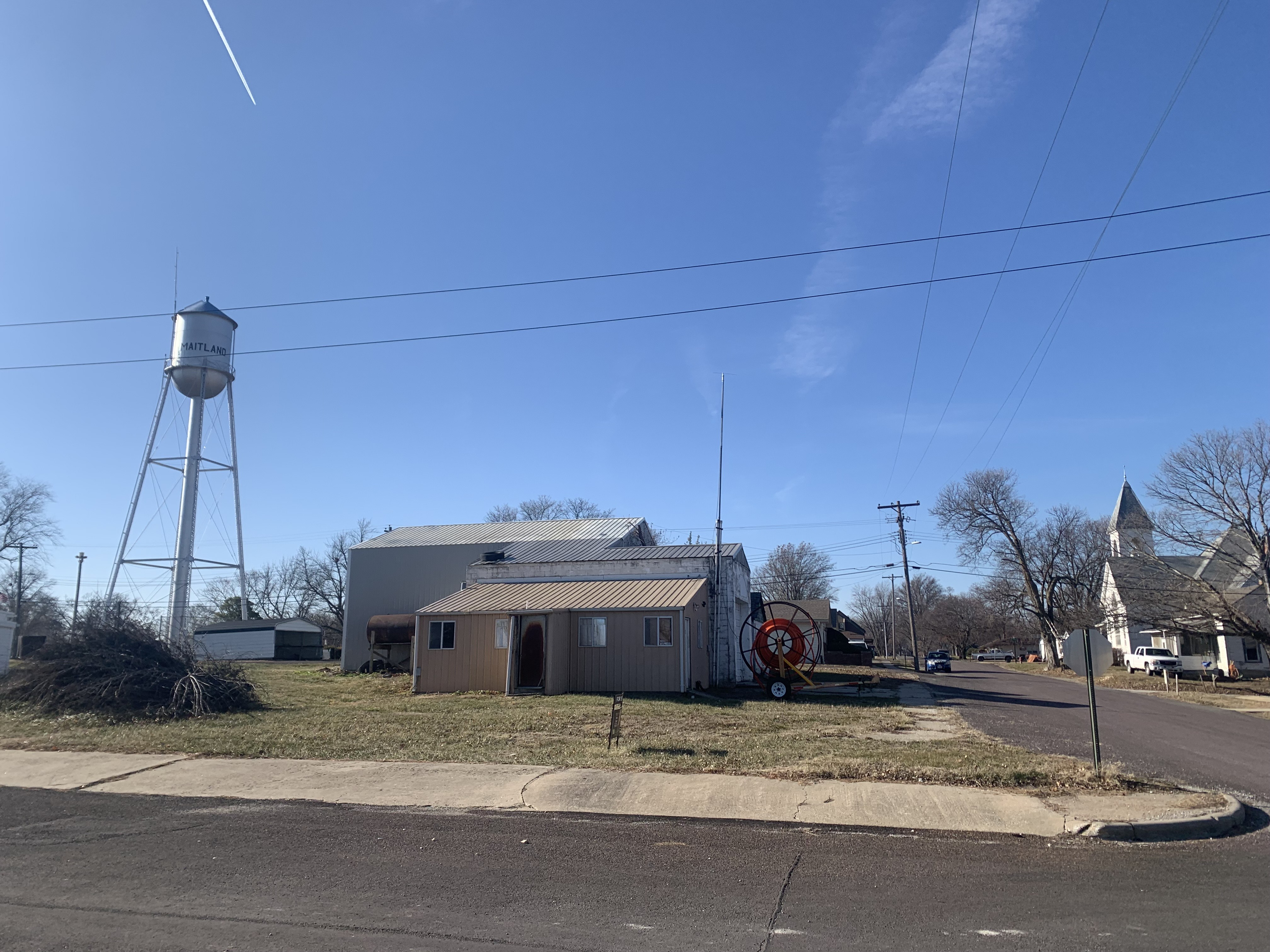

- Location of Maitland, Missouri
- Coordinates: 40°12′08″N 95°04′40″W
- Country: United States
- State: Missouri
- County: Holt
- Township: Clay

Area
  - Total: 0.31 sq mi (0.81 km^{2})
  - Land: 0.31 sq mi (0.81 km^{2})
  - Water: 0 sq mi (0.00 km^{2})
- Elevation: 942 ft (287 m)

Population (2020)
  - Total: 276
  - Density: 883.4/sq mi (341.07/km^{2})
- Time zone: UTC-6 (Central (CST))
  - Summer (DST): UTC-5 (CDT)
- ZIP code: 64466
- Area code: 660
- FIPS code: 29-45596
- GNIS feature ID: 2395819
- Website: www.maitlandmo.com

Maitland is a city in Holt County, Missouri, United States. The population was 276 at the 2020 census. At one point the city billed itself as the "Bluegrass Mecca"—home to the largest bluegrass farm in the world.

== History ==
Maitland was platted on May 12, 1880. The town is named after John Skirving Maitland, who was a surveyor for the Nodaway Valley Railroad (the construction company for the Kansas City, St. Joseph and Council Bluffs Railroad) that arrived in Maitland in 1880 when its superintendent, John Fisk Barnard, purchased the land for the town from John S. and Delila Swope. The railroad would eventually be taken over by the Burlington Northern Railroad before eventually being abandoned.

David Ward King, Inventor of the King Road Drag

Maitland is a farming community. One of the farmers from Maitland was David Ward King, inventor and promoter of the King road drag—an invention that essentially was two logs lashed together and dragged behind horse or mule teams that was an effective and inexpensive method to grade dirt roads. It was the horse-drawn forerunner of the modern road grader. The invention came at the time Henry Ford started to mass-produce automobiles. Before its invention, wet country roads became muck and were often nearly impassable. The use of the King Road Drag kept rural roads solid, even when wet, which rendered them passable all the time. These improved rural roads made possible both the advent of the automobile and rural mail delivery.

In the first half of the 20th century, Maitland claimed to have the largest bluegrass seed producing farm in the world. John Q. Weller was to claim that the 10,000,000 pounds (4,500,000 kg) of seed produced on his farm was more than the harvested seed output of the entire state of Kentucky. In some years, Weller would get permission to pile up bumper crops of seed on the city streets. During the harvest time in late June/early July, the town hosted a Bluegrass festival.

Bluegrass seed production in the late 1950s/early 1960s moved to farming communities in Idaho, Oregon and Washington. The Festival had been discontinued.

In 1975 the Maitland Community Betterment Association celebrated the bluegrass stripping heritage with the slogan, "Home of the Strippers."

== Geography ==
According to the United States Census Bureau, the city has a total area of 0.30 square miles (0.78 km^{2}), all land. The Nodaway River forms the east boundary of Maitland city limits; it also separates it from its sister town, Graham across the river in Nodaway County. Maitland is also located in the northeastern portion of the Whig Valley.

== Demographics ==
Historical population
Census	Pop.	Note	%±
1890	484		—
1900	805		66.3%
1910	736		−8.6%
1920	716		−2.7%
1930	576		−19.6%
1940	539		−6.4%
1950	456		−15.4%
1960	427		−6.4%
1970	319		−25.3%
1980	415		30.1%
1990	338		−18.6%
2000	342		1.2%
2010	343		0.3%
2020	276		−19.5%
U.S. Decennial Census

=== 2010 census ===
As of the census of 2010, there were 343 people, 144 households, and 100 families residing in the city. The population density was 1,143.3 inhabitants per square mile (441.4/km^{2}). There were 161 housing units at an average density of 536.7 per square mile (207.2/km^{2}). The racial makeup of the city was 99.1% White, 0.3% Native American, and 0.6% from other races. Hispanic or Latino of any race were 0.6% of the population.

There were 144 households, of which 31.9% had children under the age of 18 living with them, 53.5% were married couples living together, 11.8% had a female householder with no husband present, 4.2% had a male householder with no wife present, and 30.6% were non-families. 27.1% of all households were made up of individuals, and 12.5% had someone living alone who was 65 years of age or older. The average household size was 2.38 and the average family size was 2.81.

The median age in the city was 37.4 years. 24.5% of residents were under the age of 18; 9.6% were between the ages of 18 and 24; 25.3% were from 25 to 44; 26.2% were from 45 to 64; and 14.3% were 65 years of age or older. The gender makeup of the city was 49.3% male and 50.7% female.

=== 2000 census ===
As of the census of 2000, there were 342 people, 143 households, and 90 families residing in the city. The population density was 1,179.7 inhabitants per square mile (455.5/km^{2}). There were 173 housing units at an average density of 596.7 per square mile (230.4/km^{2}). The racial makeup of the city was 100.00% White. Hispanic or Latino of any race were 0.29% of the population.

There were 143 households, out of which 32.2% had children under the age of 18 living with them, 48.3% were married couples living together, 8.4% had a female householder with no husband present, and 36.4% were non-families. 32.9% of all households were made up of individuals, and 18.2% had someone living alone who was 65 years of age or older. The average household size was 2.39 and the average family size was 3.08.

In the city the population was spread out, with 27.8% under the age of 18, 7.9% from 18 to 24, 24.3% from 25 to 44, 24.3% from 45 to 64, and 15.8% who were 65 years of age or older. The median age was 38 years. For every 100 females, there were 112.4 males. For every 100 females age 18 and over, there were 102.5 males.

The median income for a household in the city was $31,250, and the median income for a family was $39,500. Males had a median income of $30,250 versus $18,750 for females. The per capita income for the city was $13,743. About 6.0% of families and 10.9% of the population were below the poverty line, including 13.3% of those under age 18 and 8.3% of those age 65 or over.

== Education ==
Nodaway-Holt R-VII School District is the local school district for the area, with an elementary school in Maitland and Nodaway-Holt High School and district headquarters in Graham.
