= Kings Grove, Missouri =

Extinct hamlet in Missouri, U.S.

Coordinates: 40°14′46″N 95°07′28″W

Kings Grove, or King Grove, is an extinct town in northeastern Holt County, in the U.S. state of Missouri.

Kings Grove was settled around 1850 by John B. King, and named for him. A government survey from 1839 denotes this place as Roland's Grove, for the stream Roland's Branch, the most upstream tributary of the Nodaway River in Holt County. A post office called Konoko (or Konaka) existed from 1872 to 1873, then King Grove post office was established in 1875, and remained in operation until 1881.

There was a schoolhouse and a stock farm named Kings Grove at the location until a few decades after the turn of the 20th century.
