= New Point, Missouri =

Unincorporated community in Missouri, U.S.

New Point
- Unincorporated Community
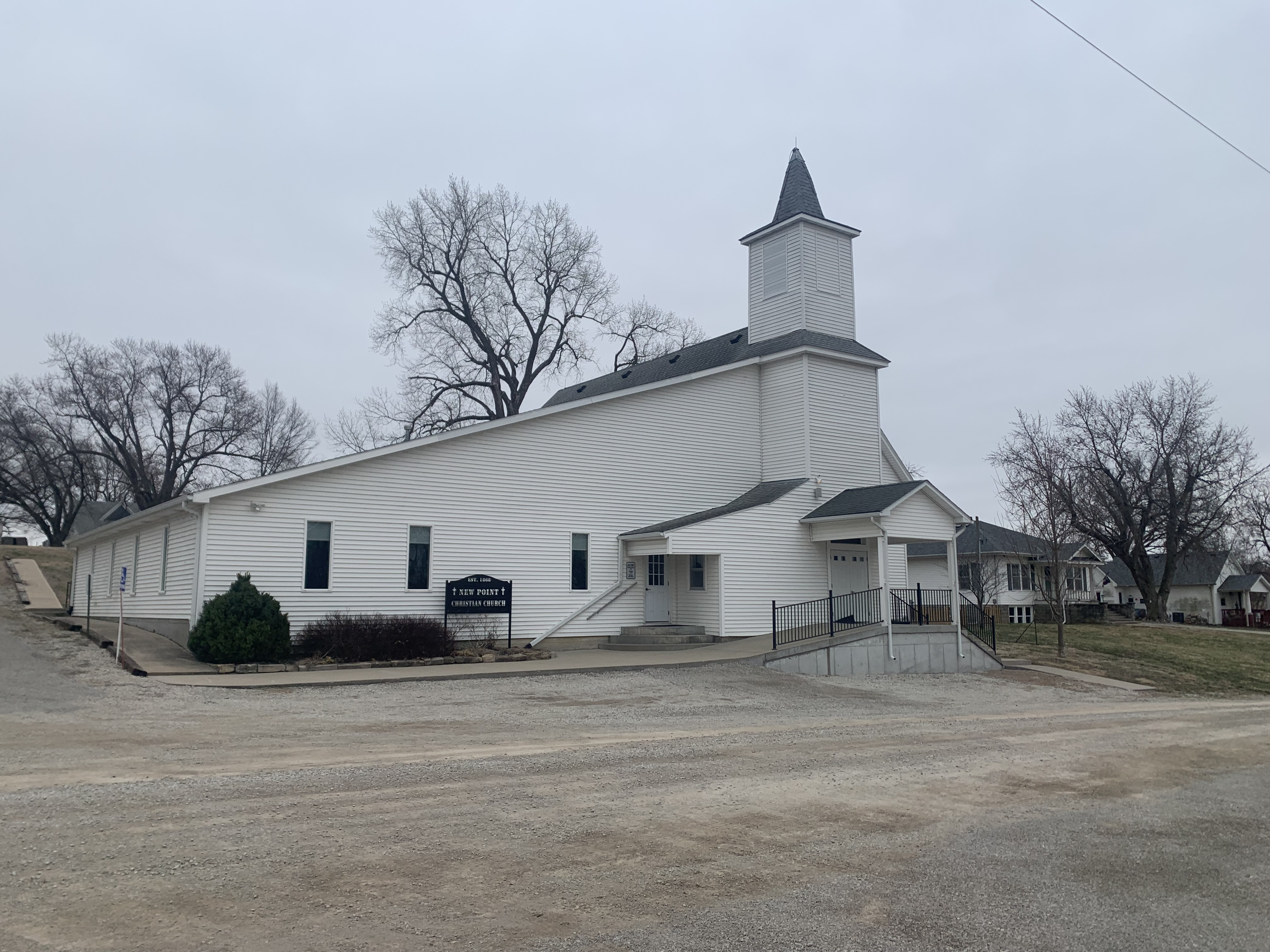
- New Point Christian Church

- Location within the state of Missouri
- Coordinates: 40°03′17″N 95°04′45″W
- Country: United States
- State: Missouri
- County: Holt
- Township: Hickory
- Platted: 1861
- Time zone: UTC-6 (Central (CST))
  - Summer (DST): UTC-5 (CDT)
- ZIP code: 64473
- Area code: 660
- GNIS feature ID: 740008

New Point is an unincorporated community in eastern Holt County, Missouri, United States.

== History ==
The community had its plat filed in 1861 and was originally named Grant, but the named switched to New Point (also stylized Newpoint) in 1875. The New Point post office shut down in 1980. At one point, both Grant and New Point were separate recognized communities.

New Point's most famous citizen is football Hall of Famer Roger Wehrli, born in 1947.

== Geography ==
New Point is located where Nichols Creek intersects Missouri Route B. It is just two miles west of the Nodaway River which is also the Andrew County border. It is located approximately five miles northeast of Oregon, six miles northwest of Fillmore, and about ten miles south of Maitland.
