= Loess Bluffs National Wildlife Refuge =

Protected land in Missouri, U.S.

- IUCN category IV (habitat/species management area)
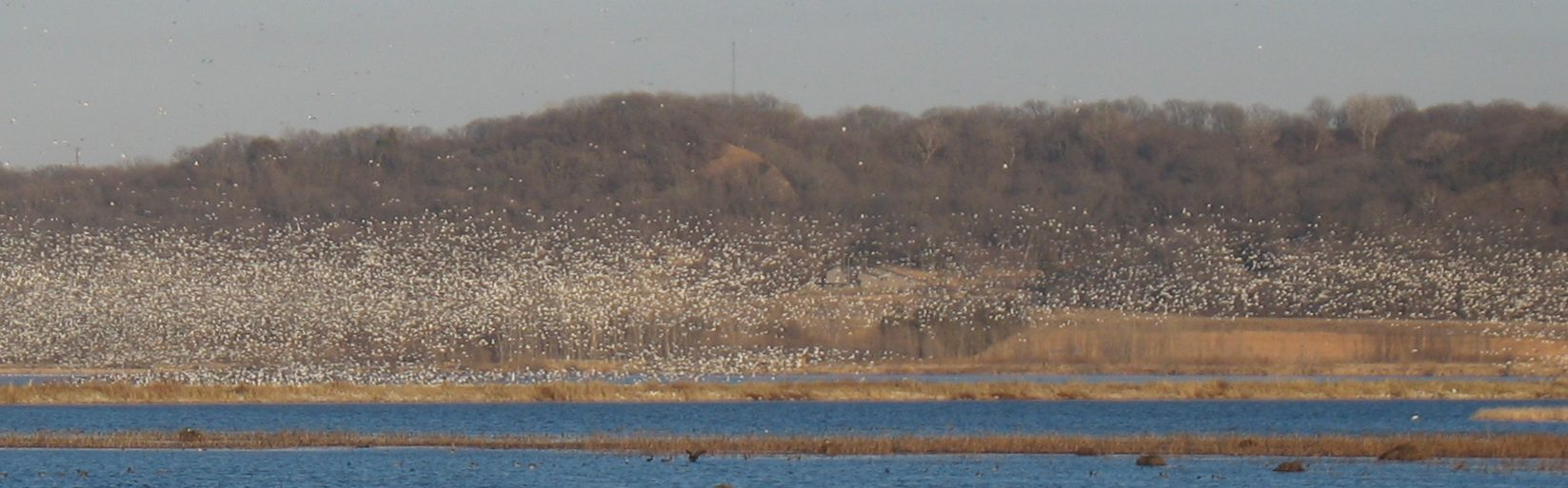
- Snow Geese against the Loess Hills

- Location within the United States
- Location: Holt County, Missouri, United States
- Nearest city: Mound City, Missouri
- Coordinates: 40°04′08″N 95°13′34″W
- Area: 7,415 acres (30 km^{2})
- Established: 1935
- Governing body: U.S. Fish and Wildlife Service
- Website: Squaw Creek National Wildlife Refuge

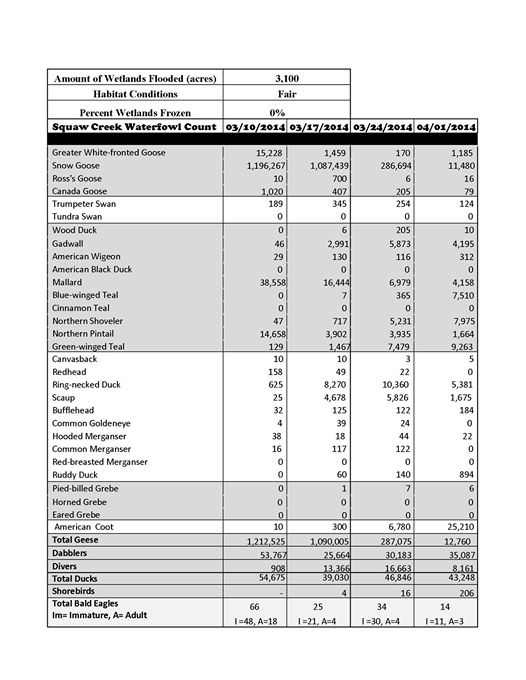
Weekly waterfowl counts released by the Refuge are used to track the migration of species which pass through, including snowgeese.

Loess Bluffs National Wildlife Refuge is a National Wildlife Refuge in northwestern Missouri, United States (formerly Squaw Creek National Wildlife Refuge). It was established in 1935 by President Franklin D. Roosevelt as a refuge and breeding ground for migratory birds and other wildlife.

The refuge comprises 7,350 acres (30 km^{2}) along the eastern edge of the Missouri River floodplain south of Mound City, Missouri in Holt County, Missouri.

The refuge is bounded by the Loess Hills on the east with a trail going to the top built originally by the Civilian Conservation Corps. The most dramatic moments occur during spring and fall migrations, when the refuge serves as a chokepoint for hundreds of thousands of ducks and geese (particularly snow geese) on the Central Flyway. As many as 475 bald eagles have been sighted on the refuge in the winter. The refuge annually celebrates the eagle visits with "Eagle Days" celebrations. In February 2013, over one million snow geese were counted. A weekly survey in early 2024 recorded nearly 4,200 trumpeter swans.

== History ==
The land which was originally wetlands used by migratory fowl had earlier been used as a private hunting preserve.

In 1906 the Squaw Creek Drainage District No. 1 after much litigation using the contactors Rogers & Rogers completed ditches to drain nearly 20,000 acres (8,100 ha) of land into the Missouri River in a massive project in which more than 500,000 cubic yards of earth were moved (335,031 on Squaw Creek and 192,715 on Davis Creek) in area stretching from East Rulo to Mound City at a point where the Missouri River bottoms were said to be the widest of its entire length. The Holt County Sentinel celebrated the completion with the headline "Rolls on to the Sea...Twenty Thousand Acres of Land Reclaimed and Will Here After Blossom as the Rose". The article said that people from Kansas City would have to find some place to hunt.

The draining of the land did little to prevent the flat area on the Missouri River bottoms from flooding from the streams that emptied into the area. In 1908 two years after its completion the land was flooded. In 1915 in a flood that was said to be worse than the Great Flood of 1881 which had been an incentive for draining the land indundated much of land.

On August 23, 1935 Executive Order 7156 by President Franklin D. Roosevelt called for a reversal of the project to create a "refuge feeding and breeding ground for migratory birds and other wildlife". It was the first national wildlife refuge in Missouri. Its original planned name was the "Squaw Creek Migratory Water Fowl Refuge". The original plan called for it to be 8,135 acres but the government was unable to acquire all the land and it was reduced to 7,415 acres. The plan allowed for management of the runoff from the local creeks with various pools. The Civilian Conservation Corps was tasked with restoring the wetland state.

== Facilities ==
Among the construction at the refuge were 15 impoundments totaling 3,400 acres (14 km^{2}), construction of 14 miles (23 km) of dikes and levees and 11 miles (18 km) of ditches. The basic ditch drainage system still remains with Squaw Creek and Davis Creek combined with water from a channeled Tarkio Creek draining almost due south from the refuge into the Missouri.

The headquarters area includes a 100-seat auditorium and 875 square feet (81 m^{2}) of exhibit space (the University of Missouri also has Loess Hills exhibits as does the St. Joseph Museum in St. Joseph, Missouri, which has a Loess Hills diorama). A 0.25-mile (0.40 km) trail built by the Civilian Conservation Corps climbs 200 feet (60 m) vertically to a refuge overlook from which you can see Missouri, Kansas, and Nebraska.

A one-way 10-mile (16 km) gravel road (the "Wild Goose Tour Loup") travels around the edge of the refuge. The refuge reports that 134,245 visited in 2001 with 41,683 at the headquarters.

== Name ==
The refuge derived its original name from Squaw Creek, a stream originating about 30 miles (48 km) north at the Bilby Ranch Lake Conservation Area in Nodaway County, Missouri that is dammed to form the reservoirs. The creek is the larger of the two main creeks that feed the refuge and parallels the road on the west. Davis Creek, the next biggest creek, parallels the east side road. They merge with the Little Tarkio Creek just south of the refuge in a man made ditch leading five miles (8 km) to the Missouri River.

In December 2016 Daniel M. Ashe, director of the U.S. Fish and Wildlife Service, said he was going to rename the refuge to Eagle Flats by the second week of January 2017 before the Barack Obama administration left office. Authorities noted that the Fish and Wildlife Service has the authority to change names without public input. Another name that was floated after the announcement was Loess Mounds.

On January 11, 2017 the refuge was officially renamed Loess Bluffs National Wildlife Refuge. The announcement stated that the creek is still an important part of the refuge and history, but that the word "squaw" is no longer an acceptable name in the National Wildlife Refuge System.

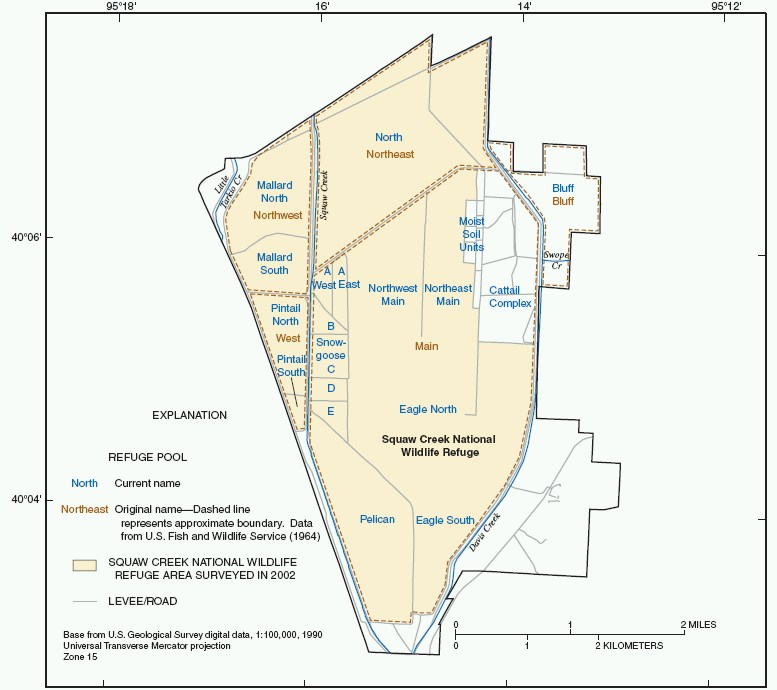
Map of the refuge

Squaw Creek Scenes

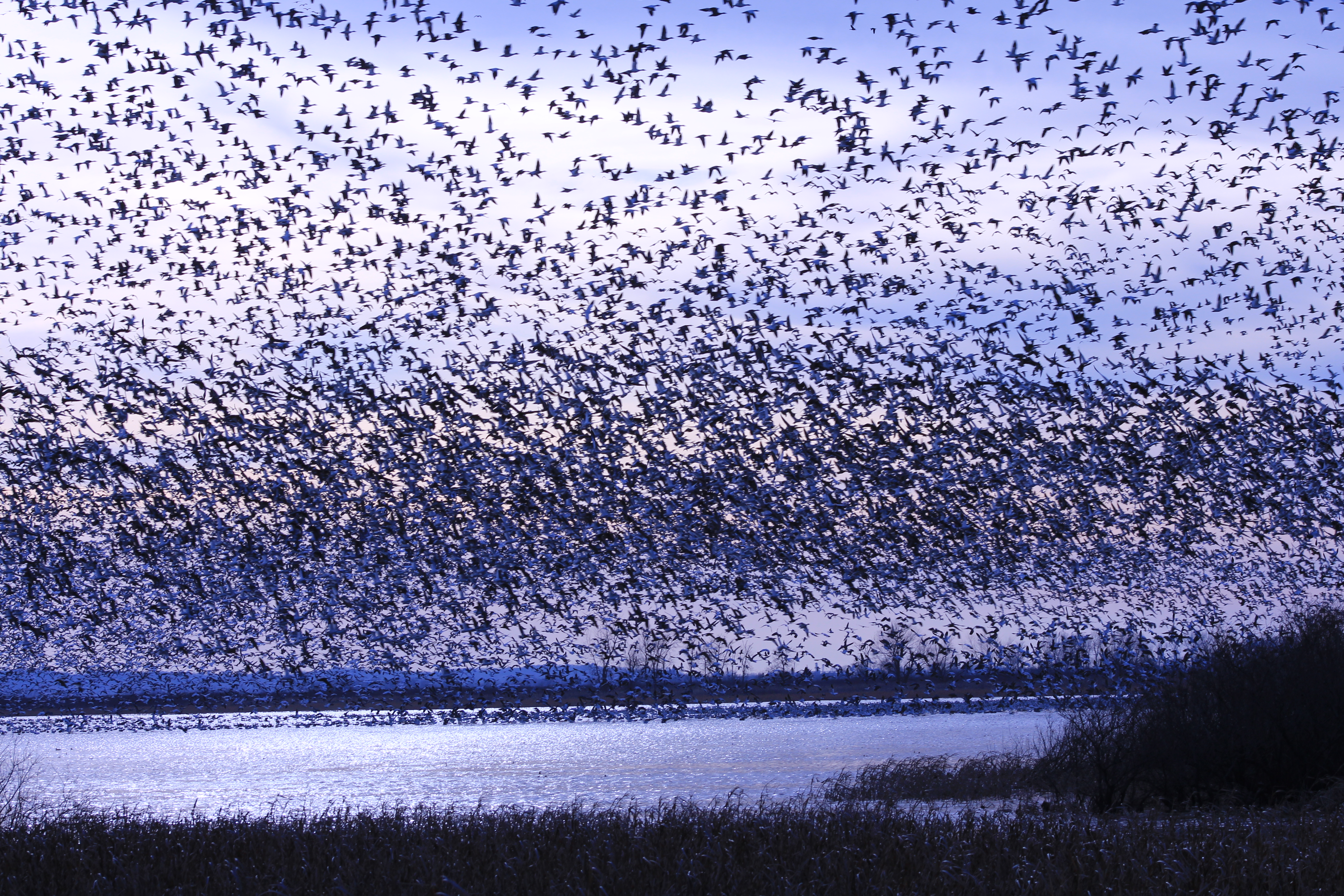
Snow geese at Bluff Pool. The refuge is a chokepoint for Central Flyway migration.
