= Rulo Bridge =

Historic bridge between Missouri and Nebraska

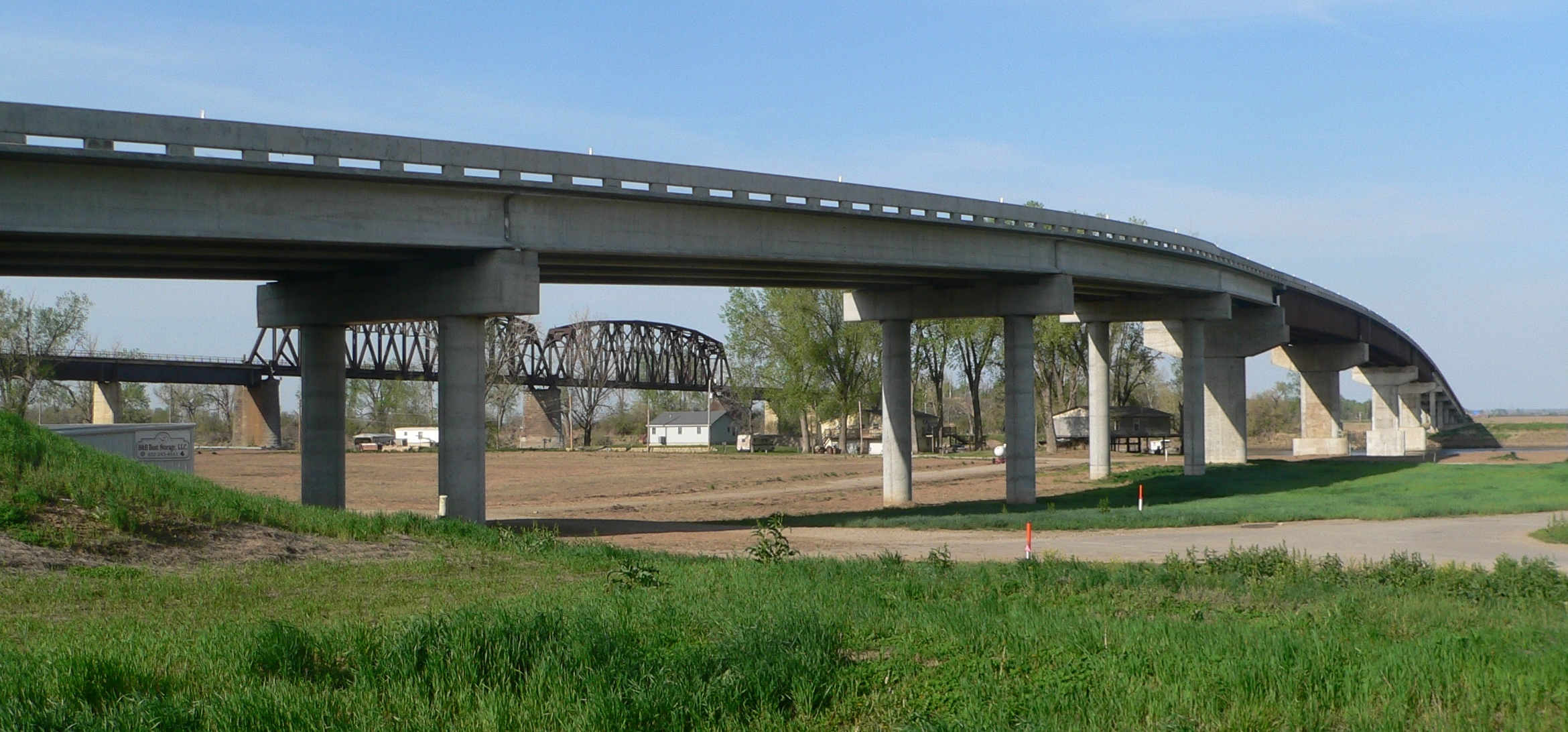
- The current bridge in 2014
- Location: US 159, Rulo, Nebraska, and Holt County, Missouri
- Coordinates: 40°3′14.35″N 95°25′13.95″W
- Built: 2013

The Rulo Bridge is a bridge that carries U.S. Route 159 over the Missouri River between Rulo, Nebraska and Minton Township, Missouri west of Big Lake.

== History ==
=== Original bridge ===
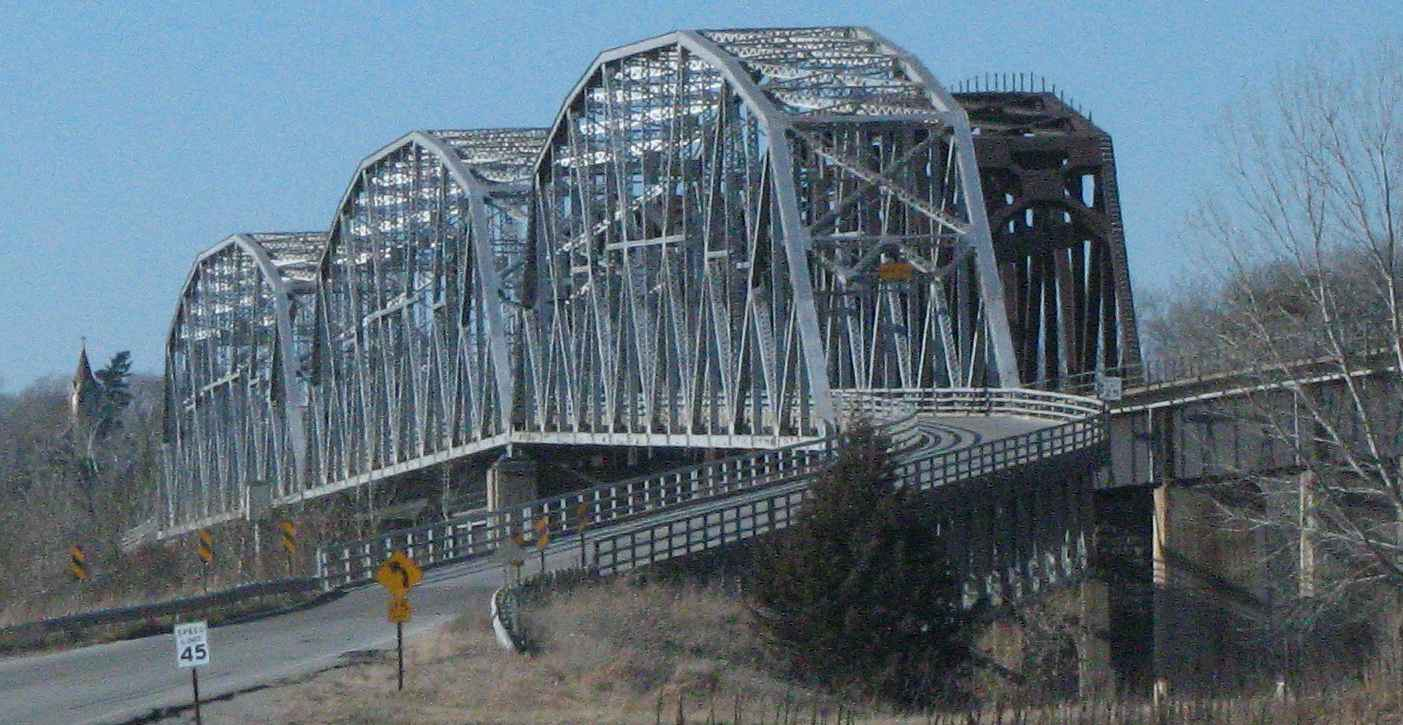
The original Rulo Bridge (left), pictured from the Missouri side in 2006, with the Rulo Rail Bridge behind it

The old Rulo bridge was a truss bridge built in 1939 by the Works Progress Administration and Kansas City Bridge Company. The architect was Harrington & Cortelyou.

It was featured in the 1973 film Paper Moon, and was added to the National Register of Historic Places in 1993.

The historic bridge was imploded on January 19, 2014, and removed from the National Register that year.

=== Current bridge ===
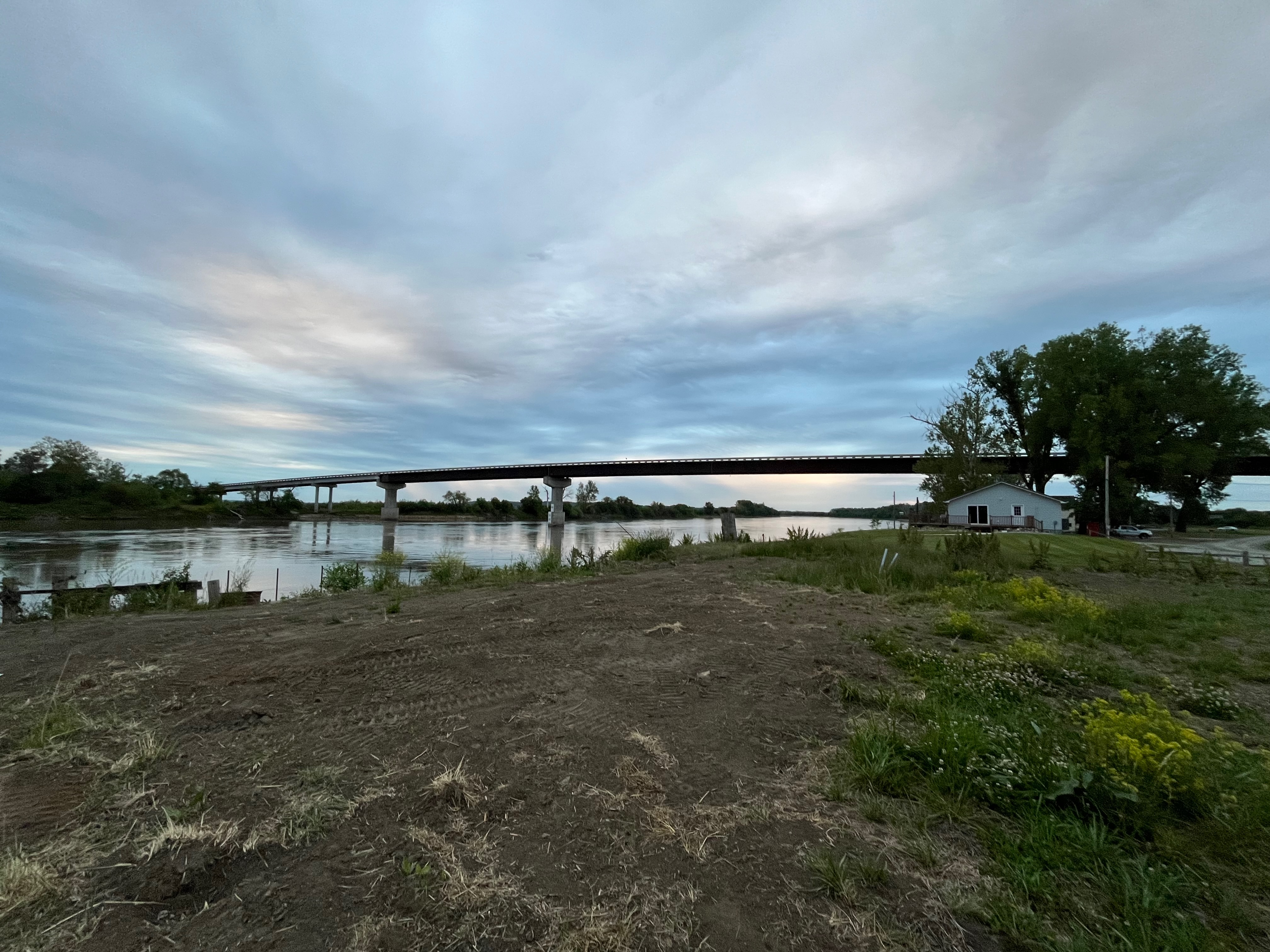
The current bridge in twilight in 2025

In March 2009, Nebraska Department of Roads approved a plan for a new bridge, which would be 650 feet (200 m) south of the old bridge. The new Rulo bridge opened in 2013.

The bridge was indefinitely closed to all traffic in April 2019 as a result of the 2019 Midwestern U.S. floods. It reopened in September 2019 for access to Missouri Route 111, and the remainder of U.S. Route 159 was reopened in late October for access to Interstate 29.

== See also ==
- List of crossings of the Missouri River
- List of bridges on the National Register of Historic Places in Nebraska
- List of bridges on the National Register of Historic Places in Missouri
- National Register of Historic Places listings in Richardson County, Nebraska
- National Register of Historic Places listings in Holt County, Missouri
- List of historic bridges in Nebraska
