= Curzon, Missouri =

Extinct hamlet in Missouri, U.S.

Curzon
- Extinct Hamlet
- Location within the state of Missouri
- Coordinates: 39°56′22″N 95°09′11″W
- Country: United States
- State: Missouri
- County: Holt
- Township: Lewis
- Elevation: 850 ft (260 m)

Curzon (also known as Curzons) is an extinct community in southern Holt County, in the U.S. state of Missouri.

== History ==
The area was settled as early as 1865 and a post office called Curzon was established in 1881, and remained in operation until 1915. The community has the name of John C. Curzon, a pioneer settler. Curzon had a railroad station on the Burlington railroad. The site was alternatively known as "Curzon Switch", and a plat was never filed for this settlement.

== Geography ==
The hamlet was located between Forest City and Forbes along the Kansas City, St. Joseph, and Council Bluffs Railroad and nearby the Little Tarkio River. It, like many settlements in the Loess Hills region, is located at the foot of the bluffs.
