= Dallas, Missouri =

Extinct hamlet in Missouri, U.S.

Coordinates: 39°54′50″N 94°58′41″W

Dallas is an extinct hamlet in what was southeastern Holt County, but presently southwestern Andrew County. It was located one mile north of the mouth of the Nodaway River. Holt County had a township named Dallas well into the 1850s, but it was later subsumed by Forbes Township.

== History ==
The first attempt to start a town was on April 17, 1843, when Abraham Brown platted Dallas. A plat was filed for it on April 15th, 1856. It was never much of a town, but was a noted shipping point. It was a port used for trade with Oregon and the interior of Holt County. One staple commodity of the hamlet was hemp, there being a hemp press and several large warehouses.

There was a rivalry between this town and the even more ephemeral West Union, which was established on April 12, 1844. Both of these settlements preceded and were eventually succeeded by Forbes.
