= Missouri Route 1F =

There have been two routes in Missouri numbered Route 1F, both designated in 1922:

- Missouri Route 1F (Holt County), a spur to Forest City
- Missouri Route 1F (Jasper County), a spur to Kansas, later part of U.S. Route 66
