= U.S. Route 159 =

Highway in the United States

U.S. Route 159
- US 159 highlighted in red

Route information
- Auxiliary route of US 59
- Maintained by KDOT, NDOT, MoDOT, and the city of Horton
- Length: 83.584 mi (Note: Total mileage is the sum of each state's length) (134.515 km)
- Existed: 1935–present

Major junctions
- South end: US-59 / K-4 Alt. in Nortonville, KS
- US-73 in Horton, KS; US-36 in Hiawatha, KS; US 73 in Falls City, NE; I-29 near Mound City, MO
- North end: US 59 near New Point, MO

Location
- Country: United States
- States: Kansas, Nebraska, Missouri
- Counties: KS: Jefferson, Atchison, Brown; NE: Richardson; MO: Holt

Highway system
- United States Numbered Highway System; List; Special; Divided

U.S. Highway 159 (US 159) is an 83.6-mile-long (134.5 km) auxiliary route of US 59. It travels from Nortonville, Kansas at US 59 to New Point, Missouri, also at US 59. The highway permits through traffic on US 59 to bypass the cities of Atchison, Kansas and Saint Joseph, Missouri, traveling instead through Falls City, Nebraska and Hiawatha, Kansas.

== Route description ==
Lengths
| | mi | km |
|---|---|---|
| KS | 52.3 | 84.2 |
| NE | 13.86 | 22.31 |
| MO | 17.424 | 28.041 |
| Total | 83.584 | 134.515 |

=== Kansas ===
The southwestern end of U.S. Route 159 is in Nortonville, Kansas. It joins with U.S. Route 73 in Horton, Kansas. The two highways overlap and passing through Hiawatha, Kansas and Reserve, Kansas, stretching to the Nebraska border. The highway provides an important connection between Falls City, Nebraska and Hiawatha, Kansas, providing Nebraska residents with an alternative connection to St. Joseph, Missouri when there is a problem with the Rulo bridge.

=== Nebraska ===
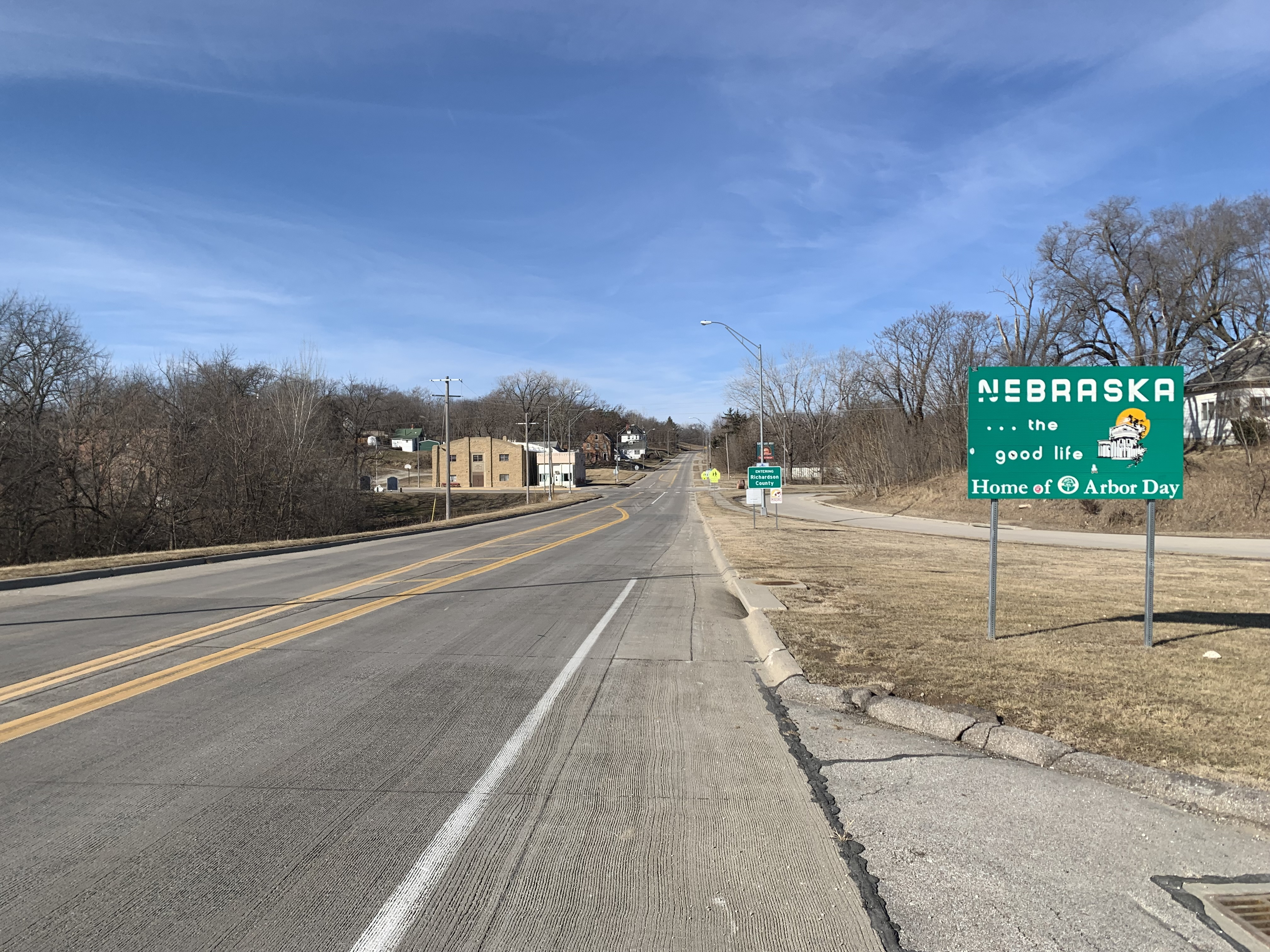
US 159 entering Nebraska at Rulo

U.S. Route 159 enters Nebraska through its southern border in Richardson County. It enters south of Falls City, Nebraska concurrently with U.S. Route 73. After coming up through the south end of Falls City, the U.S. Route 159 turns east (with Route 73 continuing north). After the eastbound turn, U.S. Route leaves the state at the Missouri River bridge in Rulo, Nebraska.

=== Missouri ===
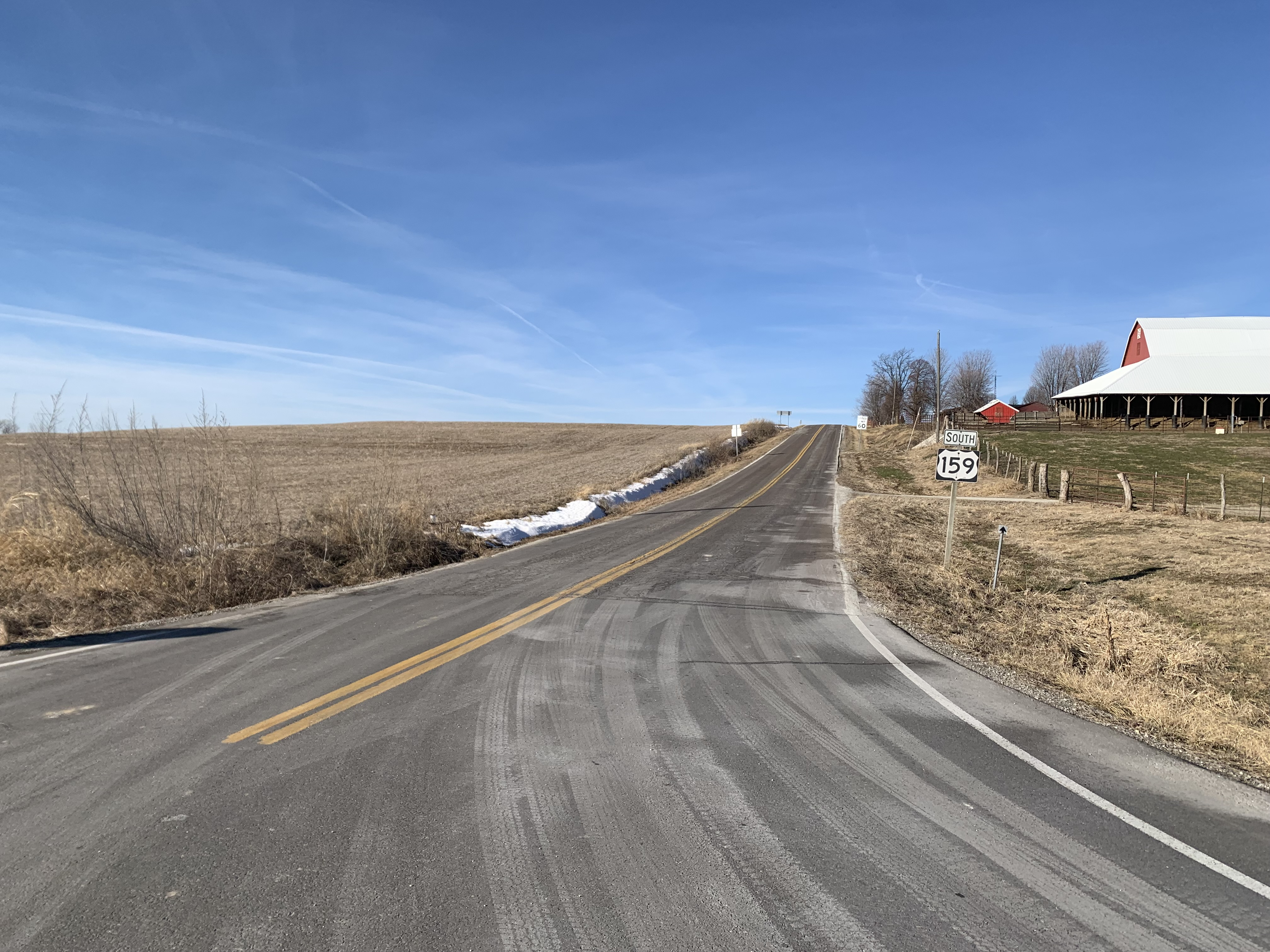
Eastern terminus of US 159 in Holt County, Missouri

U.S. Route 159 enters the state of Missouri crossing the Missouri River via the Rulo Bridge south of Big Lake, Missouri. It crosses Interstate 29 near Fortescue, Missouri before ending at US-59 near New Point. Its total length in Missouri is approximately 16 miles (26 km).

== History ==
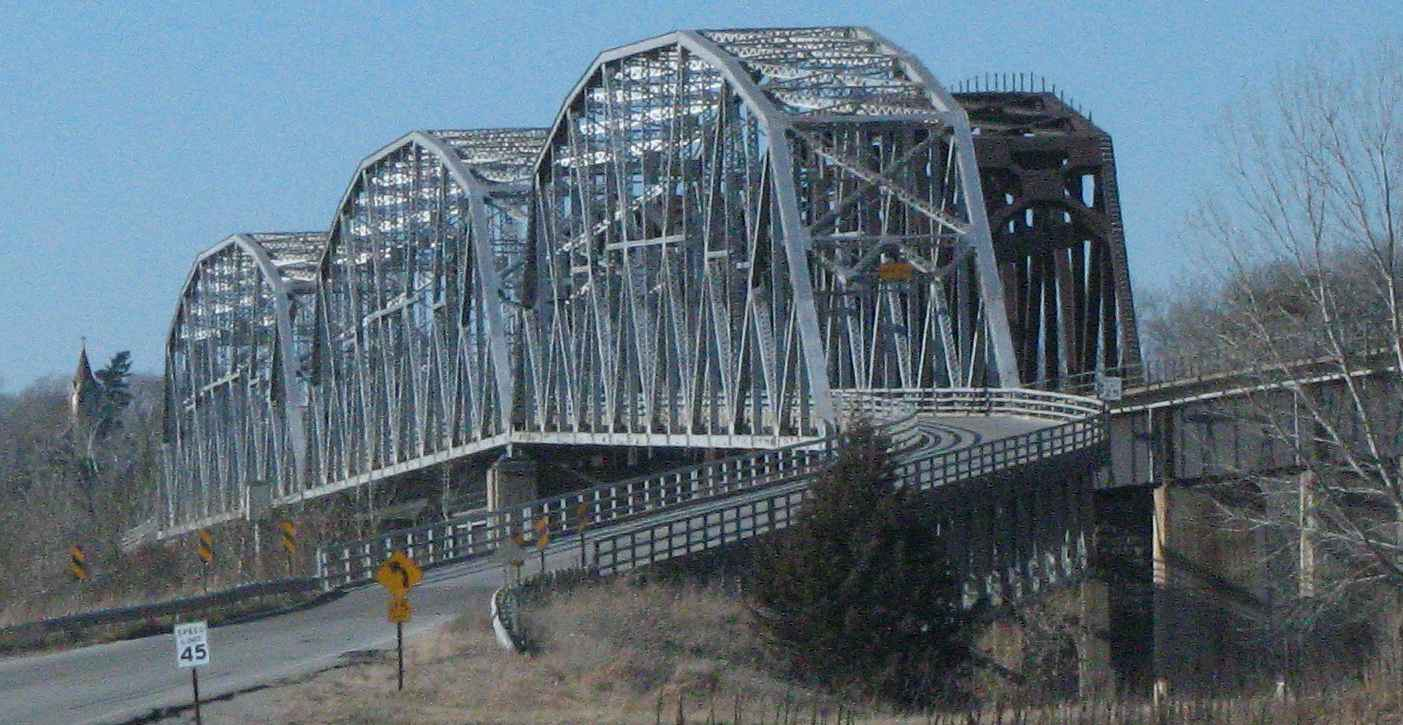
The former Rulo Bridge (US 159) from the Missouri side with the Burlington Northern bridge to the right (north)

When the route was commissioned in 1934, U.S. Route 159 only went between Nortonville, Kansas and Horton, Kansas. In 1945, it was extended north to Craig, Missouri via Falls City, Nebraska. After 1975, the route in Missouri was altered to go east from the Fortescue area to what is now its current terminus near New Point, Missouri. The old route which went to Craig is now Route 111.

In 2013, a new bridge over the Missouri River, located about 650 feet south of the old Rulo Bridge, opened to traffic. In April 2019, a large portion of this route was closed for several months because of flooding of the Missouri River. The bridge and the road between Rulo, Nebraska and Missouri Route 111 was reopened in September 2019, and the remainder of the route to Interstate 29 was reopened in late October.

== Major intersections ==
| State | County | Location | mi | km | Destinations | Notes |
|---|---|---|---|---|---|---|
| Kansas | Jefferson | Nortonville | 0.0 | 0.0 | K-4 Alt. begins / US-59 – Atchison, Topeka | South end of K-4 Alt. overlap |
| Kansas | Jefferson | Nortonville | 0.5 | 0.80 | K-4 Alt. west (Osage Street) | North end of K-4 Alt. overlap |
| Kansas | Atchison | Center Township | 3.6 | 5.8 | K-116 east – Atchison | South end of K-116 overlap |
| Kansas | Atchison | Center–Benton township line | 4.3 | 6.9 | K-116 west – Holton | North end of K-116 overlap |
| Kansas | Atchison | Center–Benton township line | 8.7 | 14.0 | K-9 east | South end of K-9 overlap |
| Kansas | Atchison | Grasshopper Township | 22.7 | 36.5 | K-9 west | North end of K-9 overlap |
| Kansas | Brown | Horton | 28.3 | 45.5 | US-73 south / K-20 east (15th Street) | South end of US-73/K-20 overlap |
| Kansas | Brown | Horton | 28.4 | 45.7 | K-20 west (15th Street) | North end of K-20 overlap |
| Kansas | Brown | Hiawatha | 40.3 | 64.9 | US-36 – Seneca, Troy | Interchange |
| | | | 52.3 0.00 | 84.2 0.00 | Kansas–Nebraska state line | |
| Nebraska | Richardson | Falls City | 4.11 | 6.61 | US 73 north (Harlan Street) | North end of US 73 overlap |
| Missouri River | | | 13.86 17.424 | 22.31 28.041 | Nebraska–Missouri state line | |
| Missouri | Holt | Big Lake | 13.248 | 21.321 | Route 111 north (Lake Shore Drive) | South end of Route 111 overlap |
| Missouri | Holt | Minton Township | 7.771 | 12.506 | Route 111 south | North end of Route 111 overlap |
| Missouri | Holt | Benton Township | 3.242– 3.223 | 5.217– 5.187 | I-29 – St. Joseph, Council Bluffs | Exit 79 along I-29 |
| Missouri | Holt | Hickory Township | 0.000 | 0.000 | US 59 – Mound City, Oregon | |
1.000 mi = 1.609 km; 1.000 km = 0.621 mi: Concurrency terminus

== See also ==
- U.S. Route 59
- U.S. Route 259

== Notes ==
Browse numbered routes
| ← K-158 | KS | → US-160 |
| ← US 138 | NE | → I-180 |
| ← Route 158 | MO | → US 160 |
