= Missouri Route 111 =

State highway in Missouri, U.S.

Route 111
- MO 111 highlighted in red

Route information
- Maintained by MoDOT
- Length: 46.108 mi (74.204 km)

Major junctions
- South end: US 59 in Oregon
- US 159 near Fortescue; I-29 near Langdon
- North end: US 136 in Rock Port

Location
- Country: United States
- State: Missouri
- Counties: Atchison; Holt

Highway system
- Missouri State Highway System; Interstate; US; State; Supplemental
← Route 110	→ Route 112

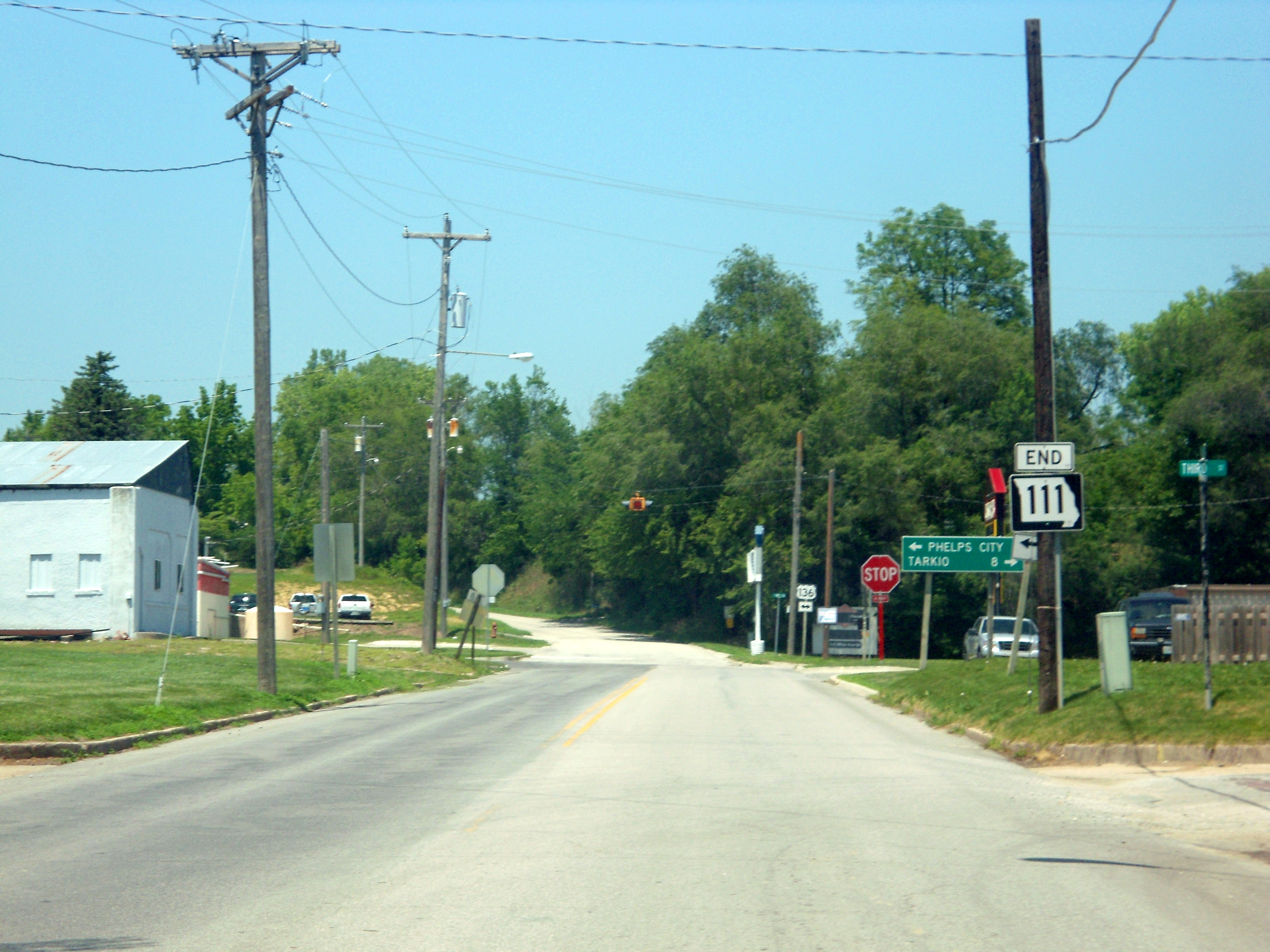
Route 111 ends at US 136 in Rock Port.

Route 111 is a highway in northwestern Missouri. Its northern terminus is at U.S. Route 136 in Rock Port; its southern terminus is at U.S. Route 59 in Oregon. The entire length of Route 111 is part of the Lewis and Clark Trail.

== Route description ==
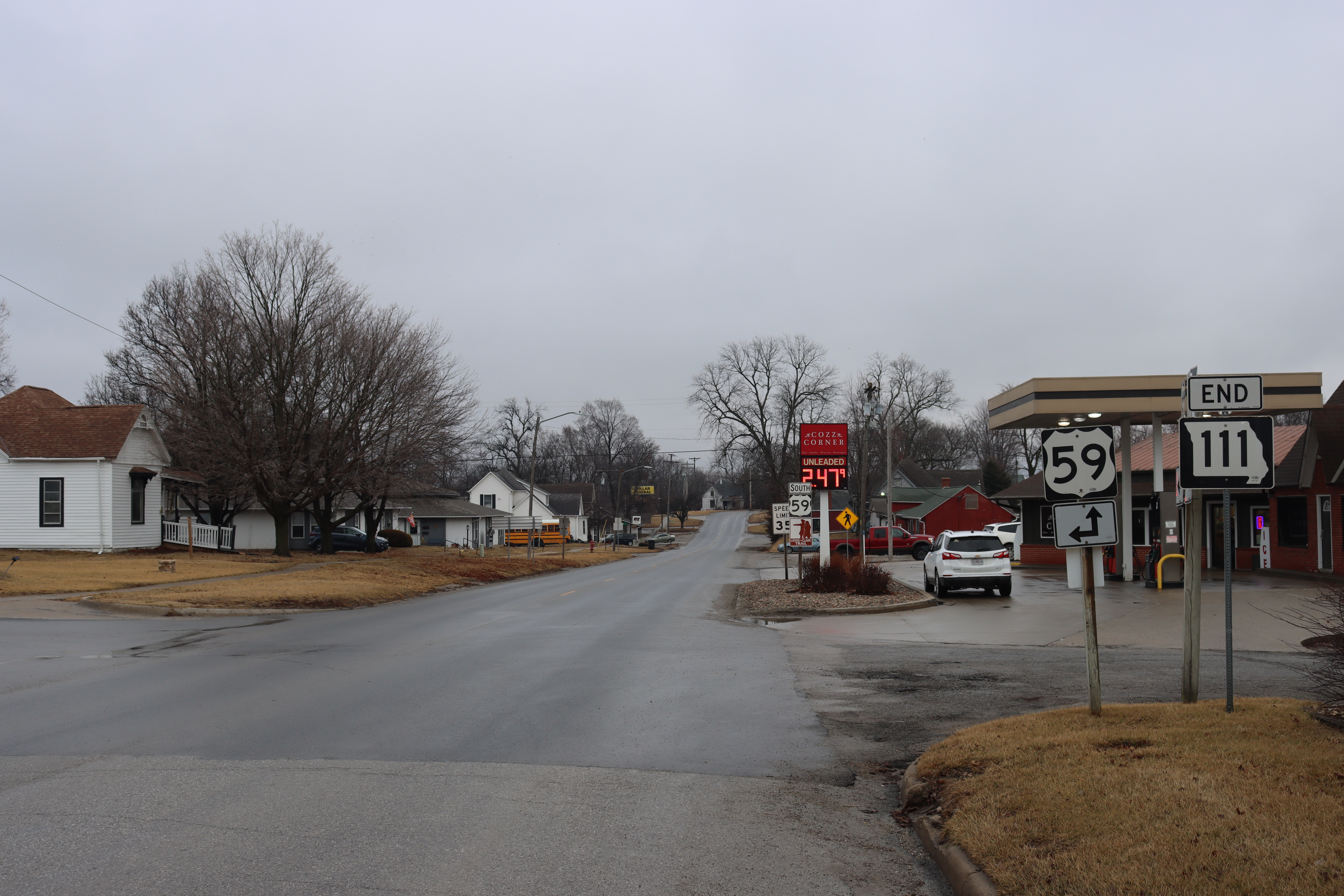
The southern terminus of route 111 in Oregon, MO

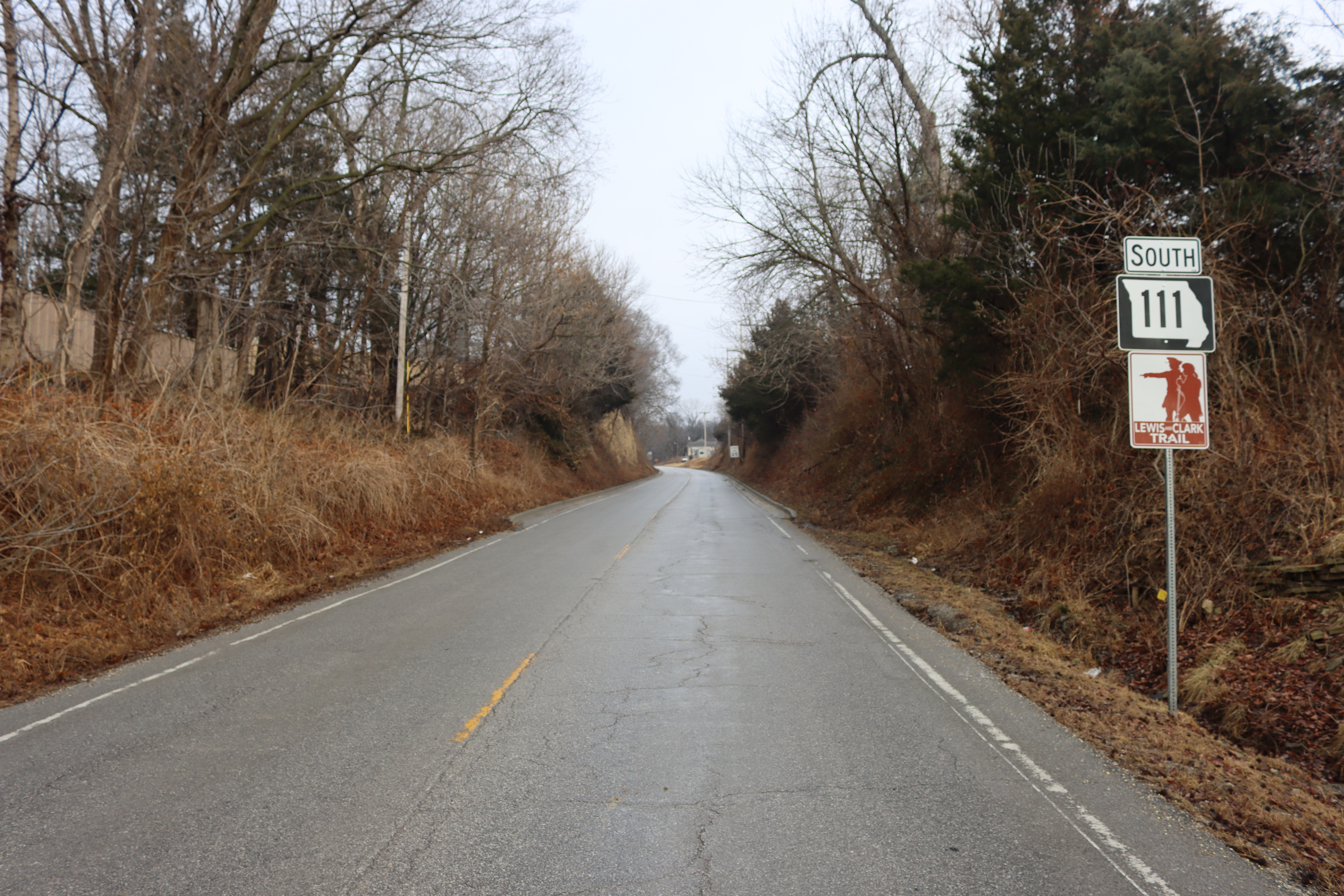
Route 111 South in Forest City, MO

Commencing in Oregon in Holt County, the highway travels west, from its southern terminus, out of town 2.5 miles (4.0 km) to Forest City. Afterward, Route 111 follows the western edge of the Loess Bluffs northwest for five miles (8.0 km) where it junctions with U.S. Route 159 (US 159) and enters the Missouri River Valley. It runs concurrently with US 159 west for around five miles (8.0 km) passing Fortescue to the south, then turns north just southeast of Big Lake. The highway continues along the east side of Big Lake and through the town of Big Lake for four miles (6.4 km) where it meets Route 118. The highway travels west for a mile (1.6 km) then north five miles (8.0 km) to the town of Craig, where Route 111 Spur begins.

Route 111 travels 3.5 miles (5.6 km) west from Craig before continuing northwesterly towards Corning. Around here is where Route 111 is closest to the Missouri River, being only 7/8 mile (1.4 km) east at a point. The highway passes by the national historic place, St. John’s Evangelical Lutheran Church, in Corning Missouri. Leaving Corning, the highway travels northwesterly, exiting Holt County, Missouri after 1.5 miles (2.4 km).

Entering Atchison County, Route 111 travels northwest four miles (6.4 km) before curving right and travels northerly another four miles (6.4 km). The highway crosses Interstate 29 (I-29) at exit 107 and continues north-northeast three miles (4.8 km) up the Loess Bluffs towards Rock Port. The highway travels through Rock Port as Main Street and meets its northern terminus with US 136.

== History ==
Missouri Route 1-F, which travelled west from Oregon to Forest City, was the first state-managed portion of what is now Route 111. A couple of years later, further portions of highway were state-maintained, such as between Forest City and Napier and between Craig and Corning. By 1929, Route 1-F was graveled, and by 1930, that same 1-F was designated as Route 118, while Route 111 was designated as the roadway between Mound City and Bigelow. By the late 1930s, these designations were inverted to what they are today.

In 1932, US 275 was fully paved and traversed the major towns of Atchison and Holt counties, leaving the prospects and purpose of what would become Route 111 diminished. Nevertheless, by 1934, the portion from Oregon to Forest City was paved, and the supplemental Route E was formed between Rock Port and Langdon, Missouri; the northeastern half of this route would later become part of Route 111. By 1935, the route extended from Forest City to Fortescue and past the newly-formed Big Lake State Park. The next year, Routes 111 and 118 finally met at the current western terminus of Route 118, west of Bigelow. By 1937, the entire present-day Route 111 consisted of state-maintained roads, with the addition of a few more supplemental routes connecting between Craig and Rock Port. Finally, by 1938, Route 111 was one complete roadway spanning the two county seats, Oregon and Rock Port.

== Major intersections ==
County	Location	mi	km	Destinations	Notes
Holt	Oregon	0.000	0.000	US 59 south (Nodaway Street) / US 59 north (Jefferson Street) / Lewis and Clark Trail	
Holt	Forest City	2.479	3.990	Route T	
Holt	Forest Township	7.901	12.715	US 159 north to I-29	Southern end of US 159 concurrency
Holt	Minton Township	11.962	19.251	Route P – Fortescue	
Holt	Minton Township	13.378	21.530	US 159 south – Rulo	Northern end of US 159 concurrency
Holt	Bigelow Township	17.816	28.672	Route 118 – Bigelow, Mound City	
Holt	Craig	24.021	38.658	Route 111 Spur (Tarkio Street) to US 59	
Holt	Corning	32.317	52.009	Route W	
Atchison	Clark Township	36.407	58.591	Route Z	
Atchison	Clay Township	42.206	67.924	Route E	
Atchison	Clay Township	42.264– 42.561	68.017– 68.495	I-29 – St. Joseph, Council Bluffs	I-29 exit 107
Atchison	Rock Port	46.108	74.204	US 136 / Lewis and Clark Trail – Phelps City, Tarkio	
1.000 mi = 1.609 km; 1.000 km = 0.621 mi: Concurrency terminus

== Auxiliary route ==
Route 111 Spur
- Location: Craig, Missouri
- Length: 0.561 mi (903 m)

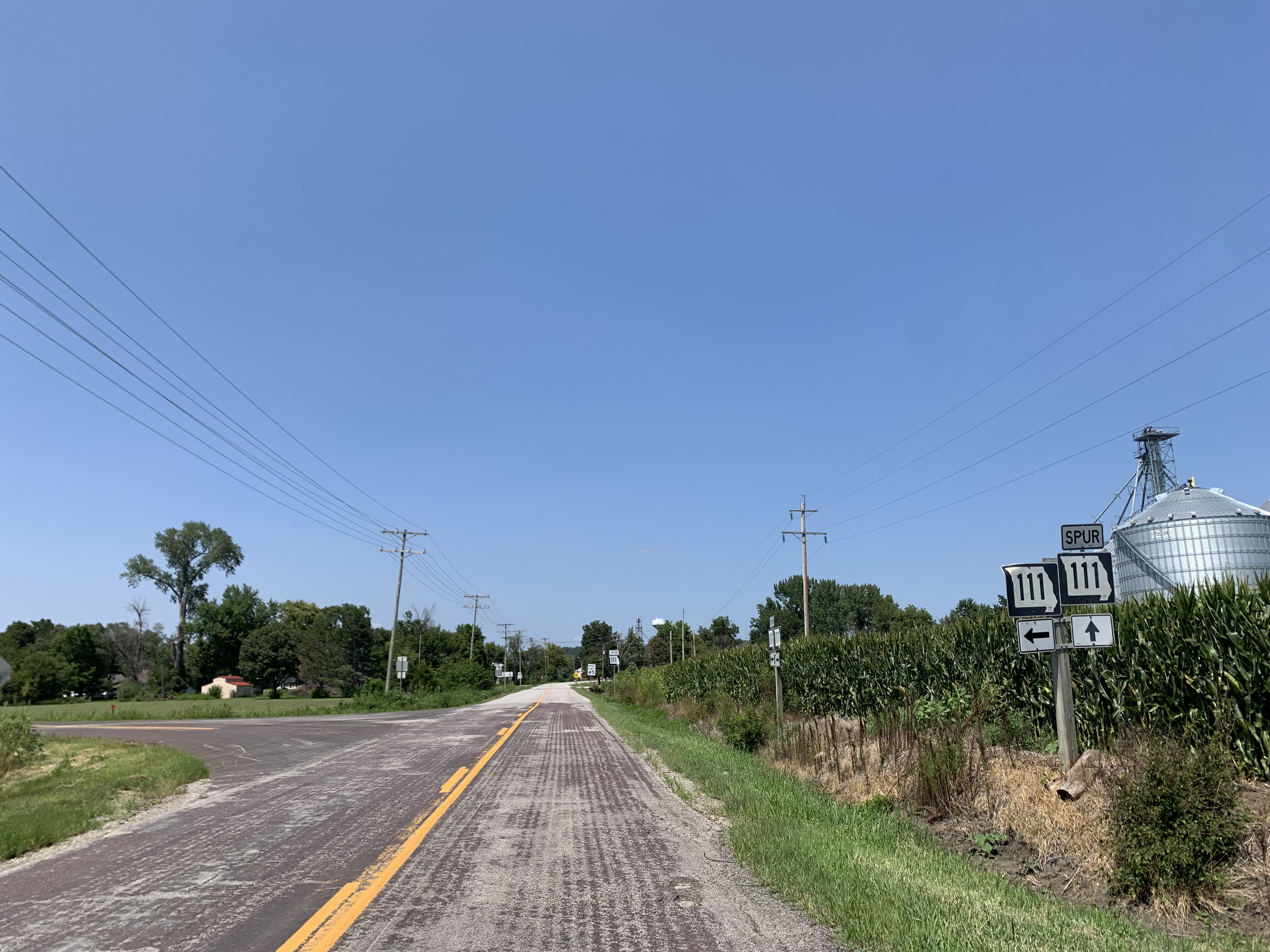
Missouri Route 111 Spur in Craig

Spur Route 111 is a 0.561-mile-long (0.903 km) spur route which connects to US 59. It lies entirely within the city of Craig.
