= Forest Township, Holt County, Missouri =

Township in Holt County, Missouri, U.S.

Forest Township
- Township
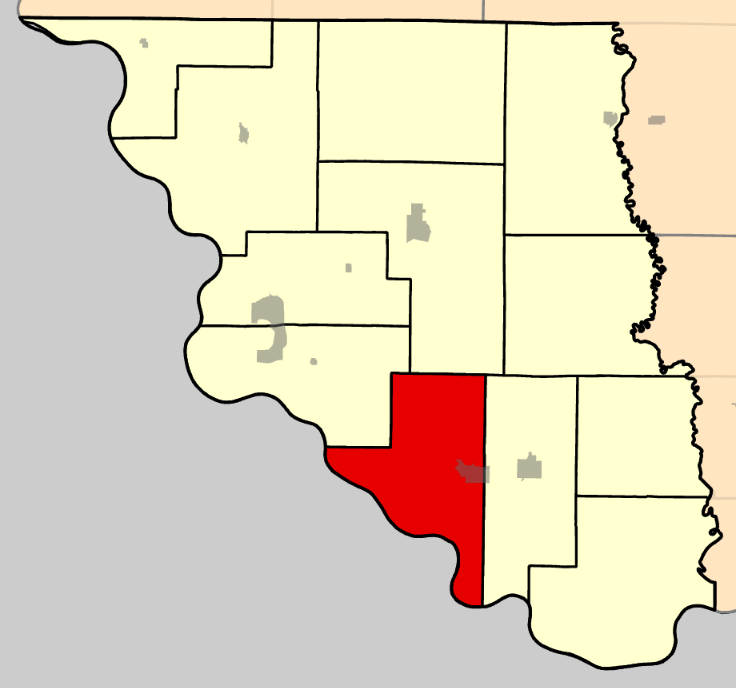
- Coordinates: 39°58′35″N 95°13′20″W
- Country: United States
- State: Missouri
- County: Holt

Area
  - Total: 35.95 sq mi (93.1 km^{2})
  - Land: 35.05 sq mi (90.8 km^{2})
  - Water: 0.9 sq mi (2.3 km^{2}) 2.5%
- Elevation: 843 ft (257 m)

Population (2020)
  - Total: 298
  - Density: 8.5/sq mi (3.3/km^{2})
- FIPS code: 29-08725048
- GNIS feature ID: 766765

Forest Township is a township in Holt County, Missouri, United States. At the 2020 census, its population was 298. It is roughly 38 square miles. Forest City is located in its east.

== History ==
The Kansas City, St. Joseph, and Council Bluffs Railroad was completed through this township in 1869.

There is conflicting information regarding the establishment of Forest Township. One source says it was erected in 1890 while another says it was divided from Lewis Township on August 8, 1894. The township was named for the forests within its borders. For some time after, some maps denoted Forest Township as West Lewis Township.

== Transportation ==
The following highways travel through the township:

- U.S. Route 159
- Route 111
- Route BB
- Route T
