= Big Lake (Missouri) =

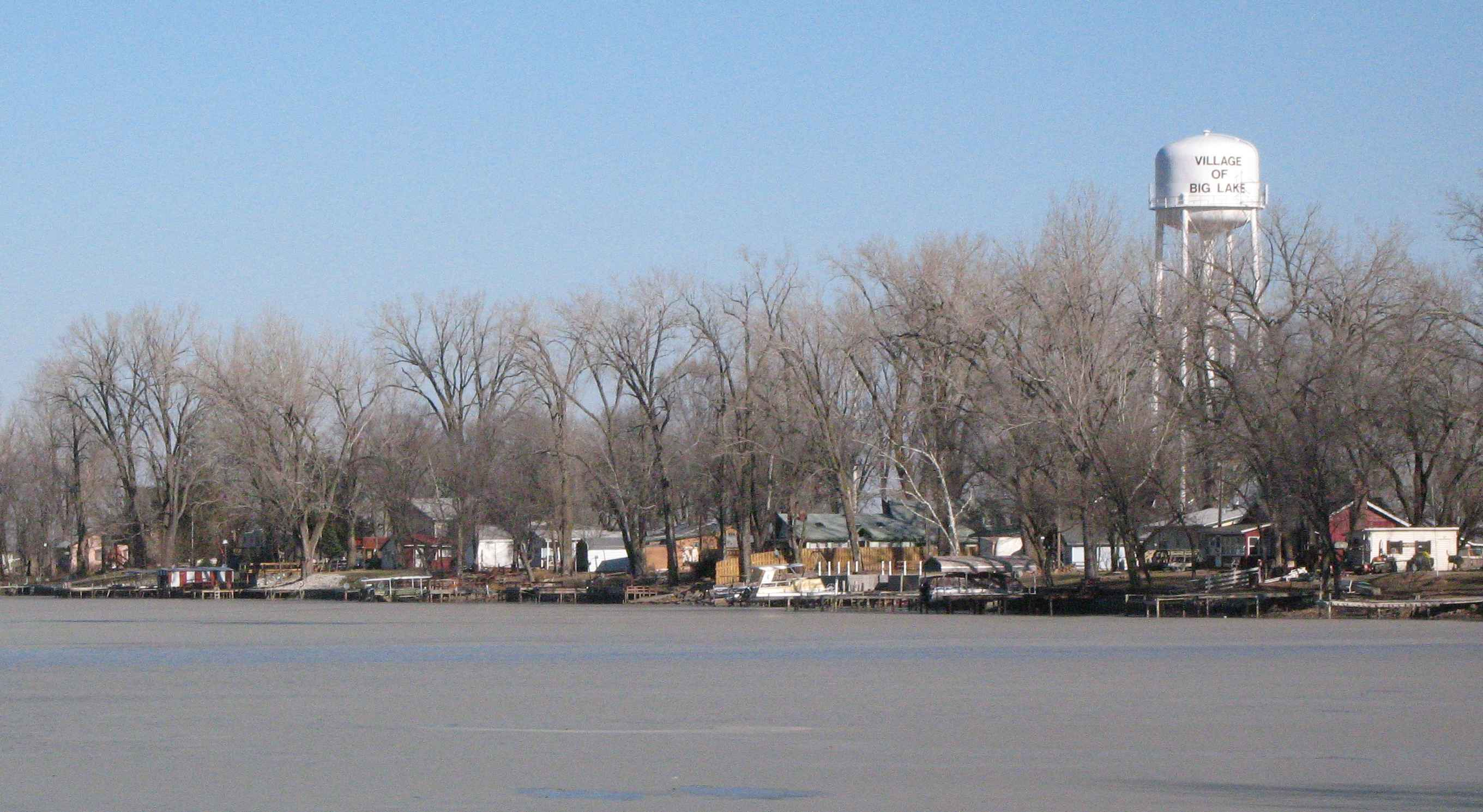

- Location within Missouri Location within the United States
- Location: Holt County, Missouri
- Coordinates: 40°04′21″N 95°20′42″W
- Type: oxbow lake
- Basin countries: United States
- Surface area: 646 acres (2.6 km^{2})
- Max. depth: 30 ft (9.1 m)
- Surface elevation: 850 ft (259 m)

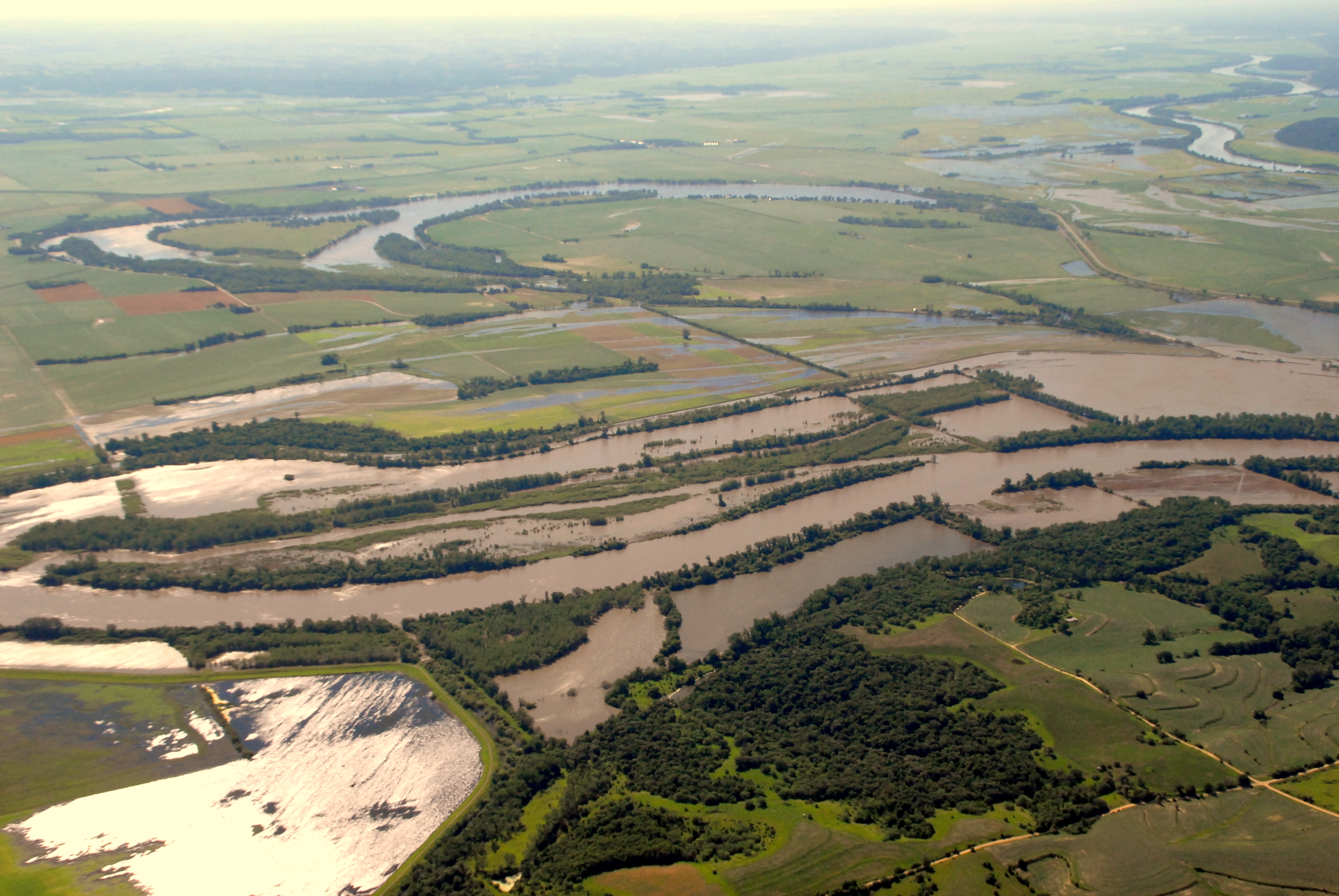
Big Lake (the curved area in the upper left) on June 15, 2011, during the 2011 Missouri River floods with the Missouri River in the foreground.

Big Lake is a 646-acre (261.4 ha) oxbow lake in Holt County, Missouri, United States. A village name Big Lake is located along the eastern shore of the lake. It is the largest oxbow lake in the state of Missouri, which also makes it the largest natural body of water.

== Etymology ==
Some of the earliest names for the lake include: Duckling Lake, Fish Lake, Higgins Lake, Impassable Lake, Tarkio Lake, Tarcio Slough, and most prominenetly, Tarkio Slough. The oldest published usage of Big Lake on a map was in a 1955 USGS map, though it is believed to originate from the 1870s. The last recorded use of Tarkio Slough was in a 1930 plat map.

== History ==
It is believed to have been formed from the Missouri River some time before the Lewis and Clark Expedition visited the area in 1804. The lake was a popular trapping and trading location in northwest Missouri even before the Platte Purchase. The first permanent settlement along the lake was established in November 1847 by the Higgins brothers. The village of Big Lake was incorporated in the 1990s to help organize and fund water utilities and levee improvements.

== Geography ==
Big Lake is located about 3 miles (4.8 km) east of the Missouri River and 5 miles (8.0 km) west of Loess Bluffs National Wildlife Refuge. Route 111 passes along the eastern shore of the lake for over 2 miles, and US 159 passes just south of the lake a few miles east from the Brownville Bridge over the Missouri River. The villages of Bigelow and Fortescue lie east of Big Lake and their economy is supported by seasonal hunting and fishing. All of Big Lake is within the corporate limits of the Village of Big Lake.

== State Park ==
Big Lake State Park, a 407-acre (1.6 km^{2}) state park, was established on the lake's northeast side in 1932. The State Park includes the largest marsh in a state park in Missouri. The remaining two-thirds of the lake shore is occupied by privately owned cabins and residences.

== See also ==
- Big Lake State Park
- Big Lake, Missouri
- List of lakes of Missouri
