= Minton Township, Holt County, Missouri =

Township in Holt County, Missouri, U.S.

Minton Township
- Township
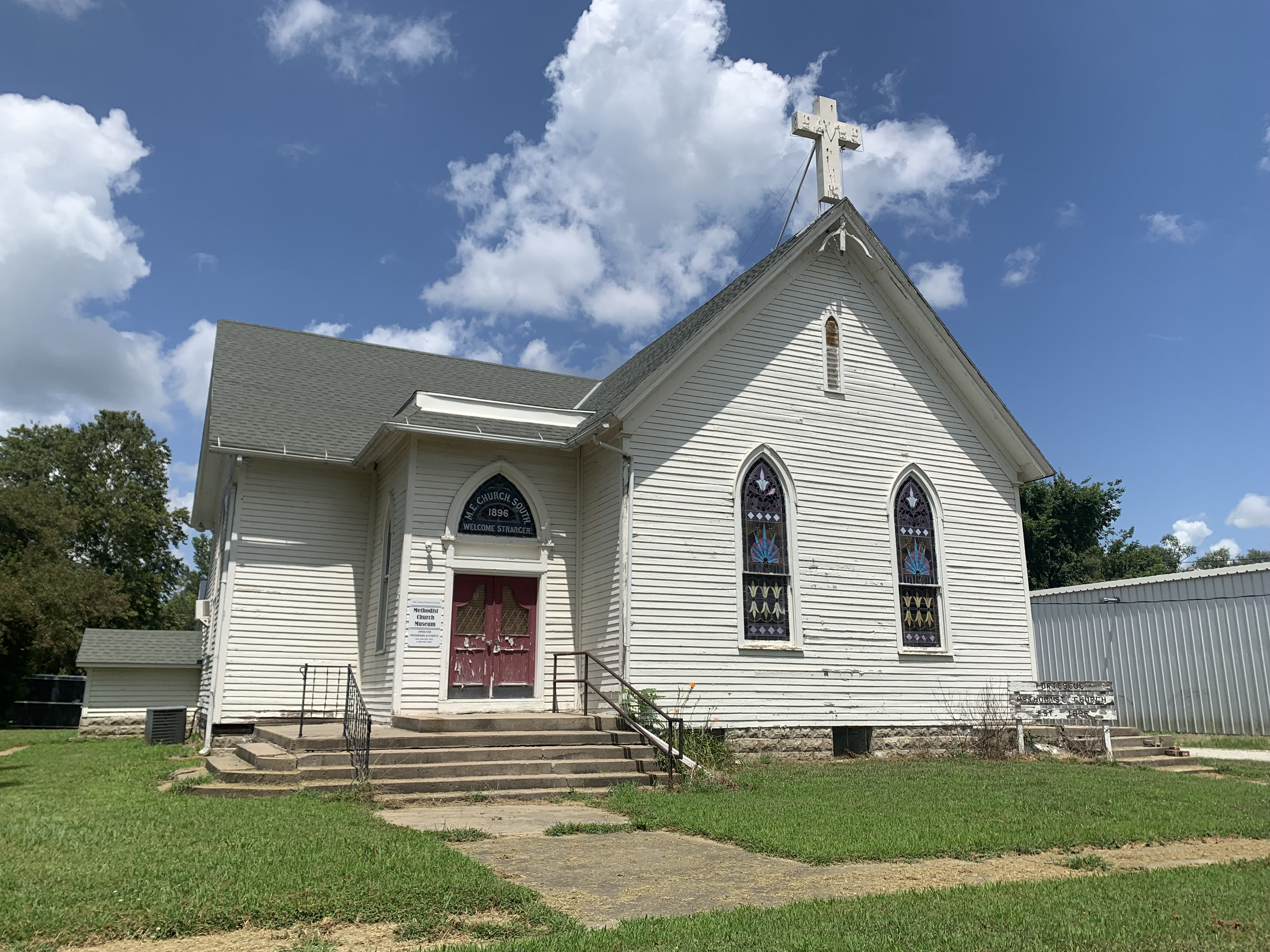
- Methodist Church in Fortescue

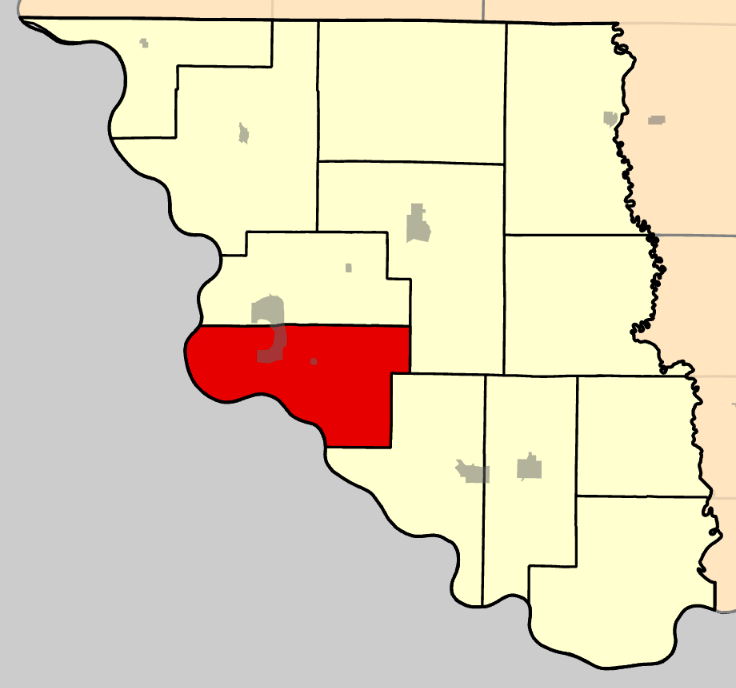
- Coordinates: 40°01′40″N 95°19′20″W
- Country: United States
- State: Missouri
- County: Holt

Area
  - Total: 35.87 sq mi (92.9 km^{2})
  - Land: 33.3 sq mi (86 km^{2})
  - Water: 2.57 sq mi (6.7 km^{2}) 7.16%
- Elevation: 853 ft (260 m)

Population (2020)
  - Total: 91
  - Density: 2.7/sq mi (1.0/km^{2})
- FIPS code: 29-08748836
- GNIS feature ID: 766770

Minton Township is a township in Holt County, Missouri, United States. At the 2020 census, its population was 91. It is around 40 square miles. Fortescue is located in the center of the township and the southern part of Big Lake is located in the north.

== History ==
There is conflicting information regarding the establishment of Minton Township. One source says it was erected in 1868 while another says it was divided from Bigelow and Lewis townships on June 4, 1894. It was named after a pioneer citizen.

The Kansas City, St. Joseph, and Council Bluffs Railroad was completed through this township in 1869.

A small trading post was located across from Rulo, Nebraska in western Bigelow Township since the 1850s. A post office called Olive Branch existed there from 1850 to 1859. Later, a railroad terminal of the Burlington and Missouri River Railroad was created and called Boswell. A post office called East Rulo existed here from 1873 to 1881. When the Rulo Rail Bridge was built in 1887, this settlement became extinct.

== Transportation ==
The following highways travel through the township:

- U.S. Route 159
- Route 111
- Route P
