= Forbes, Missouri =

Unincorporated community in Missouri, U.S.

Forbes
- Unincorporated Community
- Location within the state of Missouri
- Coordinates: 39°54′10″N 95°04′58″W
- Country: United States
- State: Missouri
- County: Holt
- Township: Forbes
- Elevation: 853 ft (260 m)
- Time zone: UTC-6 (Central (CST))
  - Summer (DST): UTC-5 (CDT)
- ZIP code: 64433
- Area code: 660
- GNIS feature ID: 718056

Forbes is an unincorporated community in southeastern Holt County, Missouri, United States.

== History ==
Forbes was laid out on April 3rd, 1869 and was established along the Kansas City, St. Joseph and Council Bluffs Railway. The community was named for railroad magnate John Murray Forbes. At that time there were only 40 families in the vicinity and no village established yet. The first post office called Elm Grove was operated by the founder of the town Levi Devorss from 1868 to 1895. The railroad station at that time was named Tarkio. During the 1880 census, the community of Forbes boasted a populated of 159 and was considered a village. A post office called Forbes was established in 1903, and remained in operation until 1975. The BNSF railway alongside Forbes continues to operate freight trains carrying coal for the Iatan power plant near Kansas City.

== Geography ==
Forbes is located at the intersection of Route O and Route T at the foot of the Loess Hills in the Missouri River Valley. The settlement is located on the bluffs along Forbes Creek. It is located approximately eight miles southeast of Forest City and ten miles west of Amazonia. Due to a bend in the nearby Missouri River, the state of Kansas is about three miles east, south, and west of Forbes.

== Recreation ==
Two Missouri state conservation areas are located near Forbes, Riverbreaks Conservation Area to its northwest and Monkey Mountain Conservation Area to its east.

== Education ==
Forbes is located in South Holt R-I School District which is based out of the county seat, Oregon.
