= Forbes Township, Holt County, Missouri =

Township in Holt County, Missouri, U.S.

Forbes Township
- Township
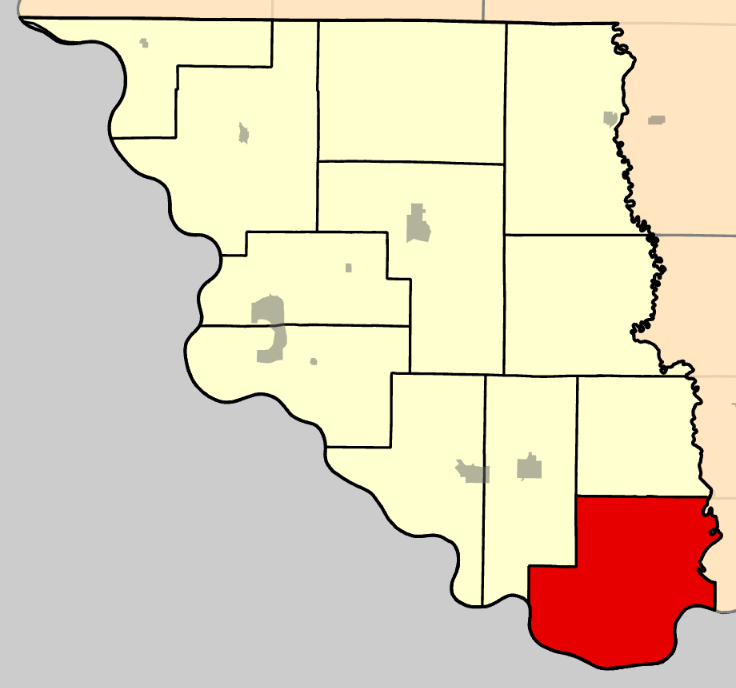
- Coordinates: 39°54′58″N 95°04′23″W
- Country: United States
- State: Missouri
- County: Holt

Area
  - Total: 44.75 sq mi (115.9 km^{2})
  - Land: 43.9 sq mi (114 km^{2})
  - Water: 0.85 sq mi (2.2 km^{2}) 1.9%
- Elevation: 1,004 ft (306 m)

Population (2020)
  - Total: 167
  - Density: 3.8/sq mi (1.5/km^{2})
- FIPS code: 29-08724976
- GNIS feature ID: 766764

Forbes Township is a township in Holt County, Missouri, United States. At the 2020 census, its population was 167. It is roughly 42 square miles. The village of Forbes is in its southwest.

== History ==
Forbes Township was established on March 22, 1871, out of the southern portion of Nodaway Township A year later, on May 10, 1872, the township's northern boundary changed to match the congressional boundary, resulting in Forbes Township expanding by six sections.

The extinct hamlets of Dallas and West Union were located in this near the mouth of the Nodaway River, but they dissipated after the establishment of Forbes; today their location is now in Andrew County due to the shifting of the Nodaway River. The Kansas City, St. Joseph, and Council Bluffs Railroad was completed through this township in 1869.

== Geography ==
The eastern border of Forbes Township is the Noodaway River and the southern border is the Missouri River.

== Transportation ==
The following highways travel through the township:

- U.S. Route 59
- Route O
- Route T
- Route U
- Route Y
