= City Hall (Forest City, Missouri) =

- U.S. National Register of Historic Places
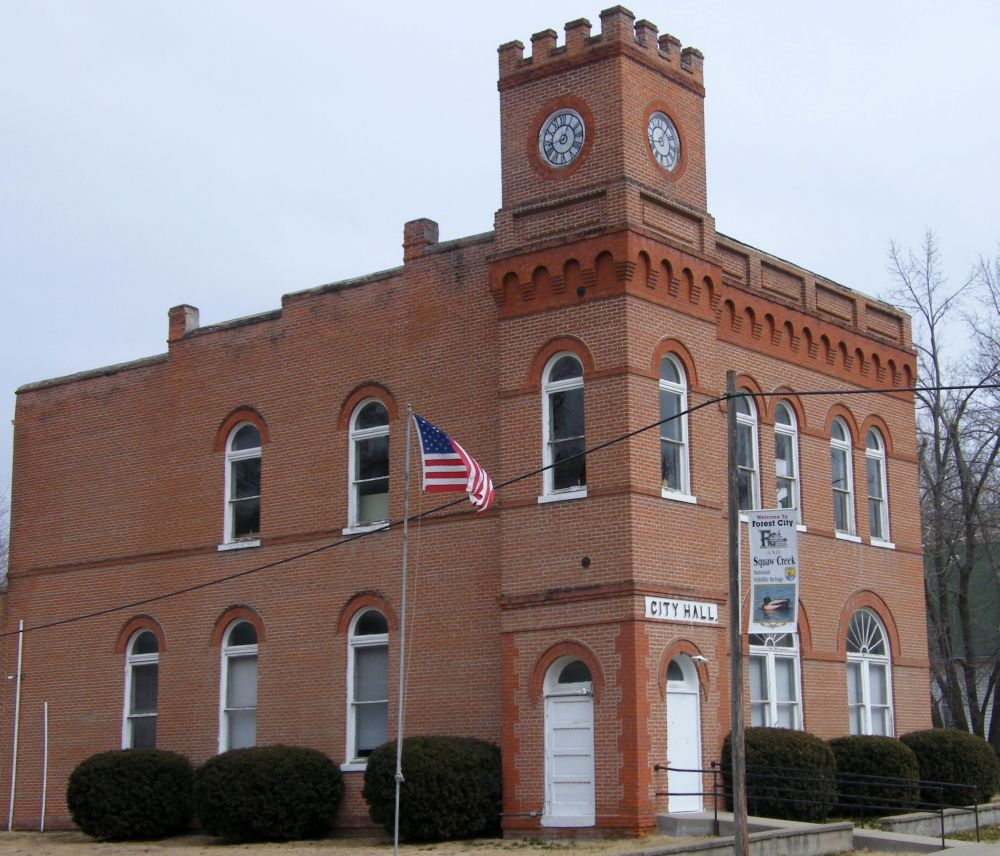
- City Hall, 2009

- Location within Missouri Location within the United States
- Location: MO 111, Forest City, Missouri
- Coordinates: 39°58′57″N 95°11′25″W
- Area: less than one acre
- Built: 1901
- Architect: Felt & Carr; Tochterman, Andrew
- NRHP reference No.: 79001362
- Added to NRHP: June 27, 1979

City Hall is a historic city hall located at Forest City, Holt County, Missouri. It was built in 1901, and is a two-story, rectangular red brick building measuring 80 feet by 40 feet. It sits on a foundation of smoothed and coursed native limestone blocks. It features a square clock tower.

It was listed on the National Register of Historic Places in 1979.
