= Nave & McCord Mercantile Company =

Former chain of stores in midwestern, U.S.

The Nave & McCord Mercantile Company was a major pioneer mercantile chain of stores in the Midwest from the mid-19th century through the early 1930s. The company's primary founders were brothers-in-law, Abram Nave and James McCord.

== Early history ==
One of four children of Henry B. and Mary (Brooks) Nave, Abram Nave was born June 15, 1815, in Cocke County, Tennessee, and came to Saline County, Missouri, with his family about a year later. In 1841, Abram made his first business venture with $1,000 (~$31,210 in 2025) borrowed from his father. With the capital, he opened a general store in Savannah, a small town located in Andrew County, Missouri. He had arrived in town with a single wagonload of miscellaneous merchandise that he sold in a small building on the west side of the town square. The following year he married Lucy McCord in Saline County. She was born September 30, 1822, in Randolph County, Virginia. They would eventually have six children, two of which died young.

In 1846, Abram opened another store under the name Nave & McCord in Oregon, Missouri, with his brother-in-law, James McCord. It was a partnership that would last 52 years, until Abram died. James was born January 7, 1826, in Randolph County, Virginia, one of four children (and only son) of William McCord and Sally Moss Field. He married Mary E. Hallick and they had 10 children.

From 1850–57, Abram, James and Dudley M. Steele were partners in the company Steele, McCord & Company that drove cattle, mules and other livestock from Missouri to Sacramento, California, where the animals were sold at a high profit. In the July 19, 1856, issue of the North West Democrat newspaper, it's stated “Abram Nave reached home a few days ago from California. His numerous friends will be glad to hear he is in good health.”

== Company formed ==
Abram and James formed the wholesale grocery company Nave, McCord & Company in 1857 in St. Joseph, Missouri. By 1860, the company had expanded its operations over an extensive territory and branch offices were soon opened in Omaha, Nebraska (with partner Charles L. Clark), and Kansas City, Missouri. However, despite the company's growth, 1860 would prove to be a disastrous year. On the morning of July 5, 1860, a fire broke out on the upper floor of the Nave & McCord building in St. Joseph. The building's walls collapsed before the general alarm was given. The debris completely covered the tenement and nine people perished. Two of Nave & McCord's clerks, who slept in the second story, had a narrow escape. The insurance companies refused to pay the loss on the building upon the grounds that the collapse had occurred before the fire. The case was tried at St. Louis, and after eight years of litigation resulted favorably to Nave & McCord thanks to an eyewitness. A guest at the nearby Patee House had been unable to sleep owing to the hot weather. Seated at his window, he said he noticed the flames and watched the fire for some time before he heard the crash when the building collapsed. Abram and James rebuilt their company and managed to continue its success.

== Other investments ==
With the company back in the black, Abram began to diversify his interests, including the St. Joseph & Denver Railroad, and various banks, insurance companies and other firms.

In 1868, Abram co-founded Leech, Nave & Company in Kansas City, which later became a Nave & McCord branch office. In 1872, he co-founded the wholesale grocery house Nave, Goddard & Company in St. Louis. Later this store also became part of the Nave & McCord chain. Abram remained in St. Louis for 10 years overseeing the company before returning to St. Joseph. He also became a partner with James and others in the Smith-McCord Dry Goods Company in Pueblo, Colo., and a stockholder in the Henry Krug Packing Company in St. Joseph.

The C.D. Smith & Company was founded in St. Joseph in 1859 with Abram and James as co-partners with Dudley M. Steele and Charles Daniel Smith, the latter of which was the company's manager. The company was originally a grocery wholesale business, but later became a drug store in 1886. Amazingly, the company remained in the Smith family for 133 years until it was bought by company employees in 1992. C.D. Smith Healthcare was acquired by AmeriSource Health Corporation in 1999.

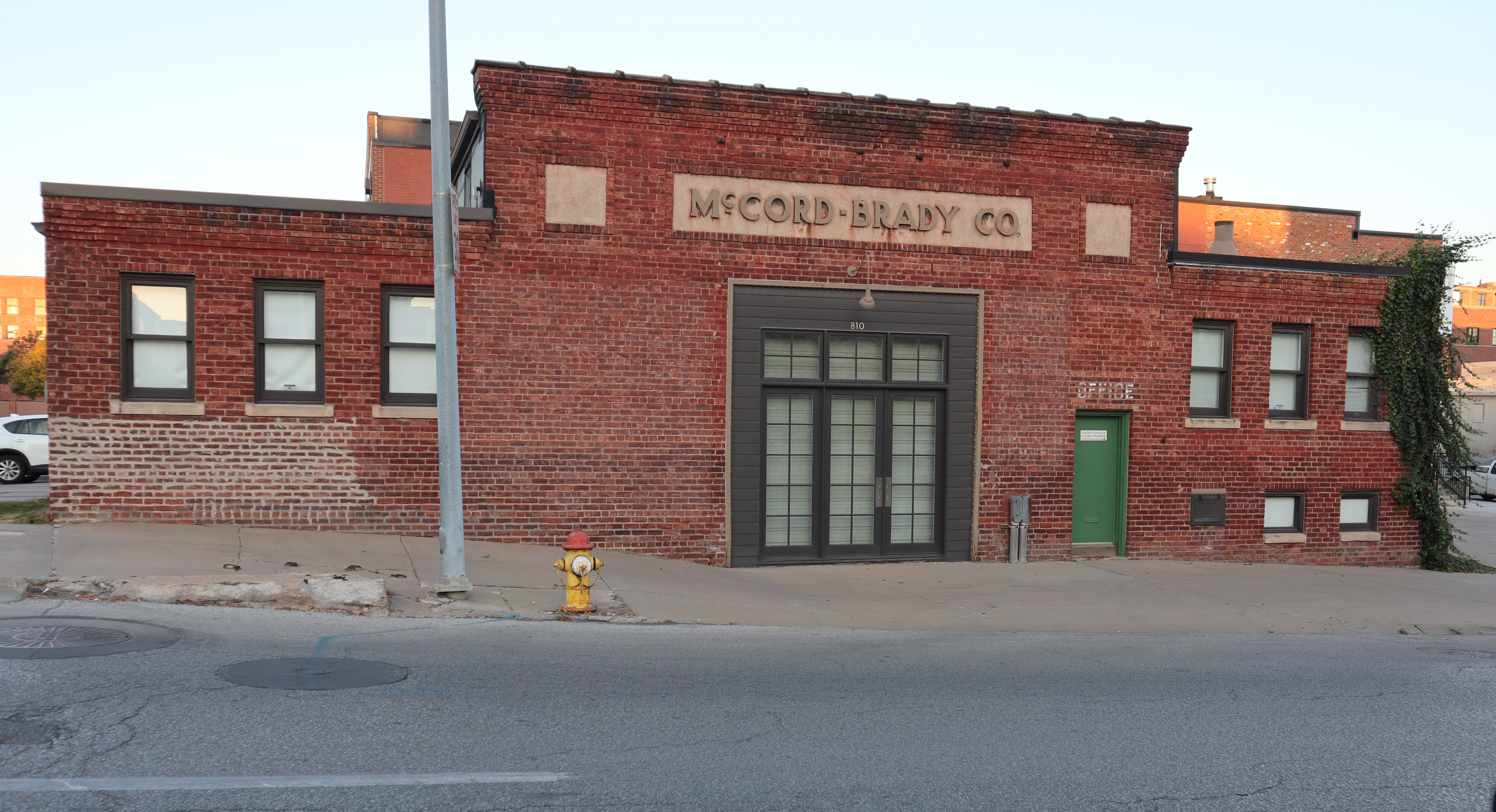
An old McCord-Brady Company building in Omaha

In 1879, a new Omaha branch of the mercantile company was opened under the name Nave, McCord & Brady. John Speer Brady moved to St. Joseph, Mo., in 1866 and got a job soon after at Nave, McCord & Company. After 13 years of service, he opened the Omaha branch and managed it. Abram eventually sold his interest in the branch and it was renamed the McCord-Brady Company. The building still stands and became Bemis Center for Contemporary Arts in 1995. Another McCord-Brady office was later opened in Cheyenne, Wyoming, from 1915 to 1932.

More than ten years younger than Abram, James McCord continued to branch out on his own with various mercantile and grocery businesses in Fort Worth, Texas; Oklahoma City; Kansas City, Mo.; Topeka, Kansas; and Hutchinson, Kansas; as well as a real estate firm in St. Joseph.

Abram's wife Lucy died November 9, 1853, in Savannah. He married his second wife, Mary Blewett, in 1875. They ended up in a bitter divorce. Abram married a third time to Augusta Bagwell on Feb. 25, 1885. He had no children from either of these latter marriages.

== Incorporation ==
Nave, McCord & Company was incorporated and re-christened as the Nave & McCord Mercantile Company in 1880. Also in 1880, the property was secured for a new building in St. Joseph on South Third Street near the lines of the Missouri Pacific and the Chicago, Burlington & Quincy railroads. Disaster struck again when a handcart loaded with nails crashed into the supporting timbers and set fire to the uncompleted edifice by crashing into an area in which matches were stored. The new five-story, brick building was finally completed in 1882. That same year, a new branch office was opened in Atchison, Kansas.

== Cattle Company ==
The Nave-McCord Cattle Company was formed in 1881 in Texas with an initial investment of 1,500 cattle and the purchase of the range rights on the Double Mountain Fork Brazos River at the mouth of Spring Creek in Garza County, Texas. The company created the Square and Compass Ranch after purchasing 125,000 acres (510 km^{2}) in Garza County. About half of the ranch land was on the Llano Estacado, which was high and level and good summer pasture, and the rest was in the broken land, which made excellent winter pasture. The herd was gradually increased through additional purchases to 15,000 head. The Square and Compass name and brand were reportedly patterned after the emblem of the Masons, of which Abram was a member. Fenced in 1884, the ranch was operated at a modest profit despite blizzards and drought in 1886. The ranch and cattle were sold in 1901 to John B. Slaughter, who renamed it the U Lazy S Ranch. The sale included 99,188 acres (401.40 km^{2}) of land at $1.60 an acre and 5,000 cattle.

== Dissolution ==
Abram Nave died June 23, 1898, in St. Joseph, and James McCord died September 24, 1903, in the same city. By then, the sons of both men had become involved in Nave & McCord.

In 1929, Nave-McCord was sold to Western Grocer Company, of Marshalltown, Iowa.

Today several of the company's former buildings still stand, including those Atchison, Kan., and Omaha, Neb. In November 2016, a fire started and completely destroyed the five-story brick building in St Joseph, Mo. The 136-year-old building was demolished soon thereafter.
