= Bigelow Township, Holt County, Missouri =

Township in Holt County, Missouri, U.S.

Bigelow Township
- Township
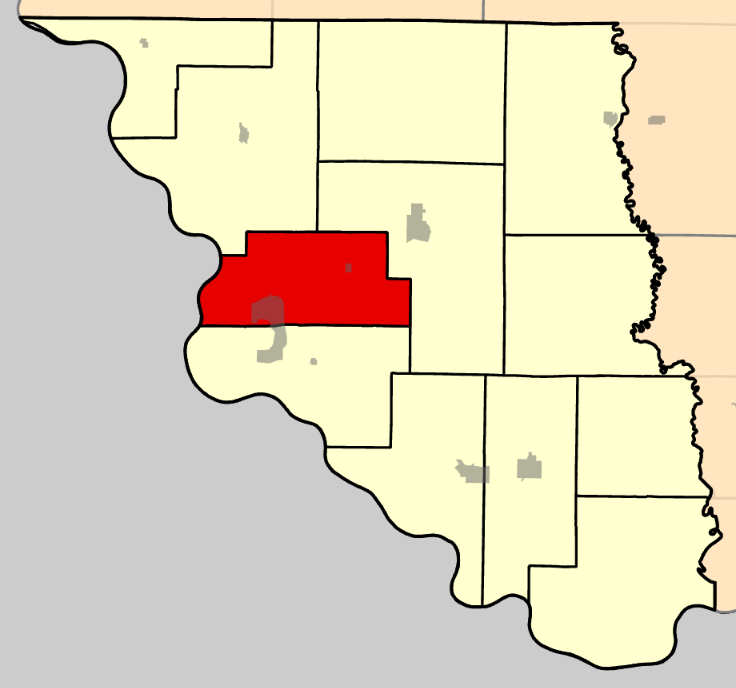
- Coordinates: 40°06′21″N 95°19′33″W
- Country: United States
- State: Missouri
- County: Holt

Area
  - Total: 31.08 sq mi (80.5 km^{2})
  - Land: 29.87 sq mi (77.4 km^{2})
  - Water: 1.21 sq mi (3.1 km^{2}) 3.89%
- Elevation: 860 ft (260 m)

Population (2020)
  - Total: 106
  - Density: 3.5/sq mi (1.4/km^{2})
- FIPS code: 29-08705482
- GNIS feature ID: 766762

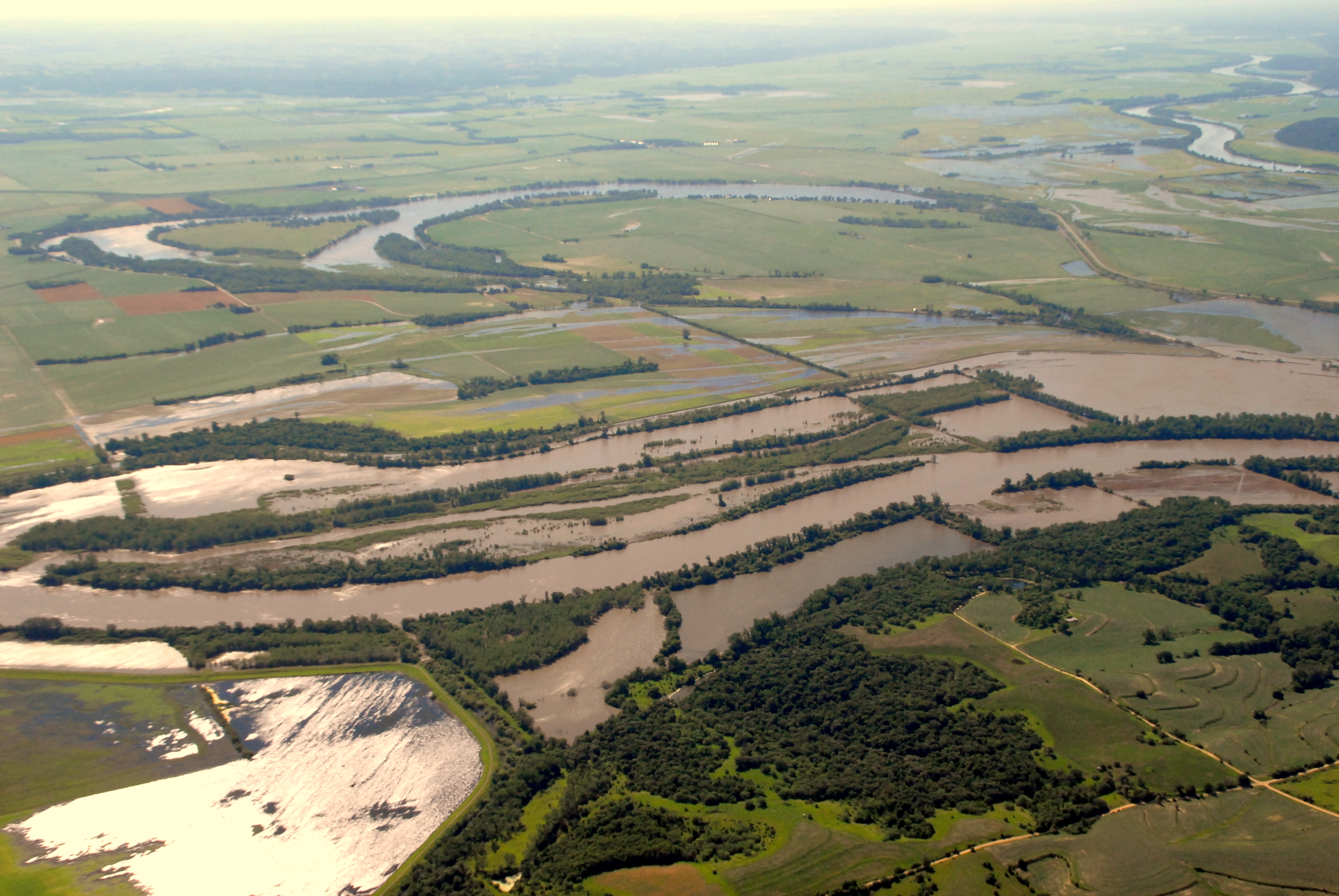
Aerial view of Bigelow and Minton townships during the 2011 Missouri River flood with Big Lake in the background, facing ESE

Bigelow Township is a township in Holt County, Missouri, United States. At the 2020 census, its population was 106. It is around 30 square miles. Bigelow, the village, is located in its northeastern quadrant, and Big Lake is located in its southwest and part of it extends into Minton Township.

Bigelow Township was established in 1869, taking its name from Bigelow, Missouri. The township was reduced in size some in 1871 and to its present limits in 1894 when Minton Township was formed.

The Kansas City, St. Joseph, and Council Bluffs Railroad was completed through this township in 1869.

== Geography ==
Bigelow and Minton townships are the only ones in Holt County located entirely in the Missouri River bottomlands.

Rush Bottoms Island, an island of the Missouri River, is located in the western portion of Bigelow Township and is within the Rush Bottoms Conservation Area.

== Transportation ==
The following highways travel through the township:

- Route 111
- Route 118
- Route P
