= Lewis Township, Holt County, Missouri =

Township in Holt County, Missouri, U.S.

Lewis Township
- Township
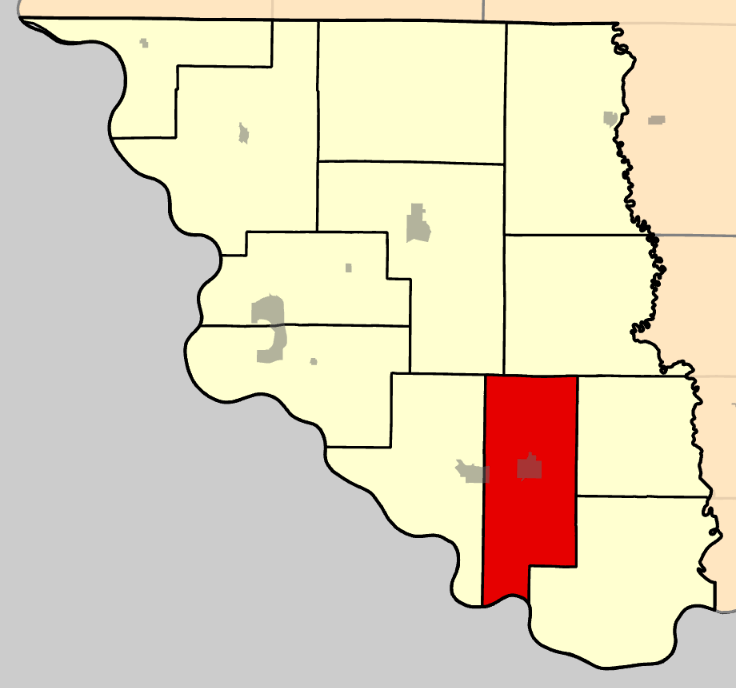
- Coordinates: 39°58′42″N 95°08′41″W
- Country: United States
- State: Missouri
- County: Holt

Area
  - Total: 35.07 sq mi (90.8 km^{2})
  - Land: 34.89 sq mi (90.4 km^{2})
  - Water: 0.18 sq mi (0.47 km^{2}) 0.51%
- Elevation: 1,001 ft (305 m)

Population (2020)
  - Total: 1,036
  - Density: 29.7/sq mi (11.5/km^{2})
- FIPS code: 29-08741798
- GNIS feature ID: 766767

Lewis Township is a township in Holt County, Missouri, United States. At the 2020 census, its population was 1036. The county seat, Oregon, is located in the center of the township.

Lewis Township was one of the two original divisions of Holt County, at one point being much larger than it currently is, even containing portions of Atchison County, Missouri and Iowa. After its creation it was reduced through the creation of most of the other townships of Holt County. It reached its present size in 1894. It likely derives its name from John Lewis, who was elected constable in the same year it was established. Forest Township split out of Lewis Township in the 1890s though for decades later maps sometimes represented them as East and West Lewis Township.

The Kansas City, St. Joseph, and Council Bluffs Railroad was completed through this township in 1869.

A small community located near Curzon, named Bluff City, was in this township and was never platted. A schoolhouse a mile northwest of Curzon, named Bluff City, persisted until at least 1926.

== Transportation ==
The following highways travel through the township:

- Interstate 29
- U.S. Route 59
- Route 111
- Route T
