= Big Lake, Missouri =

- Village
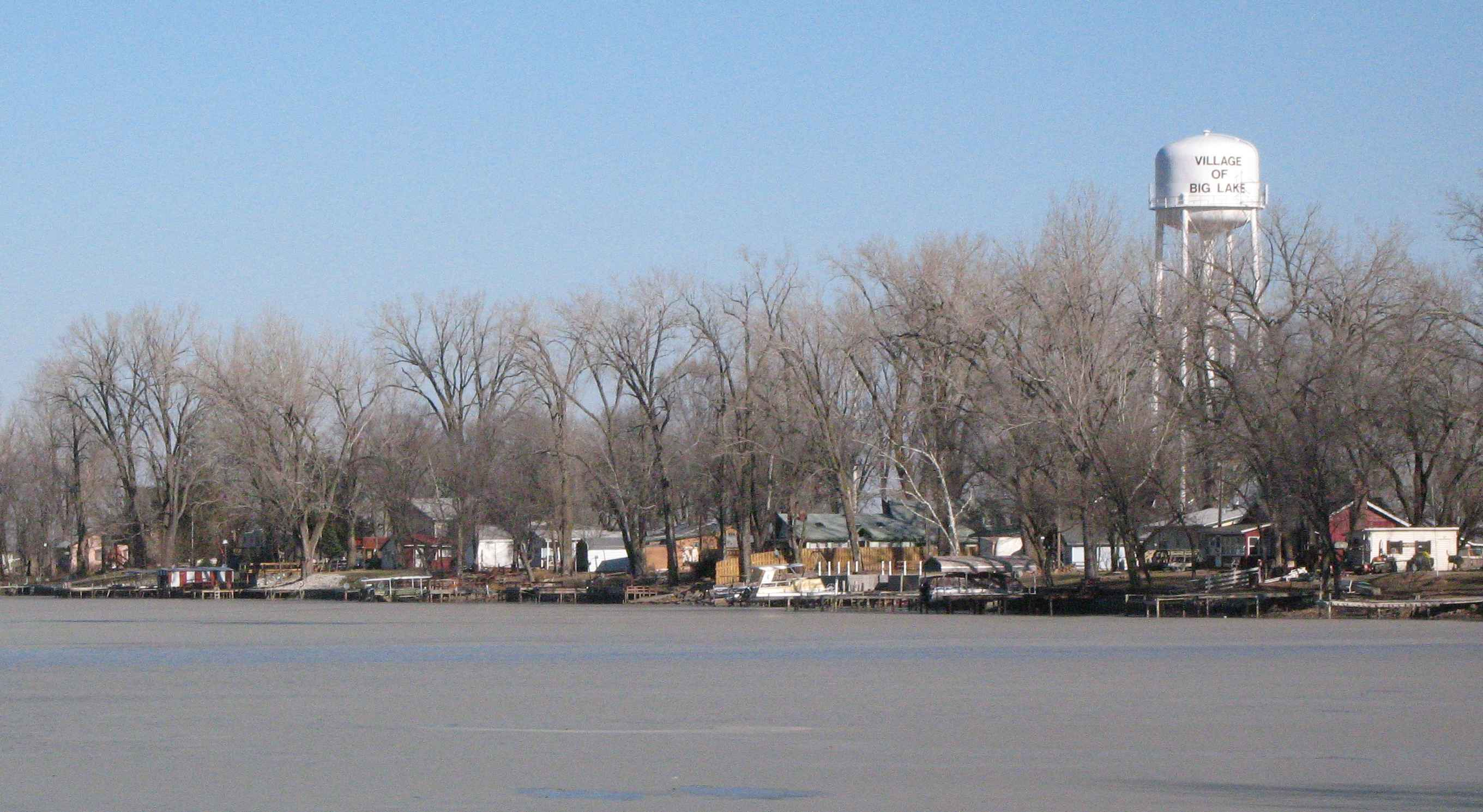
- Big Lake in December

- Location of Big Lake, Missouri
- Coordinates: 40°04′25″N 95°21′07″W
- Country: United States
- State: Missouri
- County: Holt
- Townships: Bigelow and Minton

Area
  - Total: 2.63 sq mi (6.80 km^{2})
  - Land: 1.66 sq mi (4.29 km^{2})
  - Water: 0.97 sq mi (2.52 km^{2})
- Elevation: 860 ft (260 m)

Population (2020)
  - Total: 65
  - Density: 39.3/sq mi (15.16/km^{2})
- Time zone: UTC-6 (Central (CST))
  - Summer (DST): UTC-5 (CDT)
- FIPS code: 29-05495
- GNIS feature ID: 2398117
- Website: www.biglakemo.net

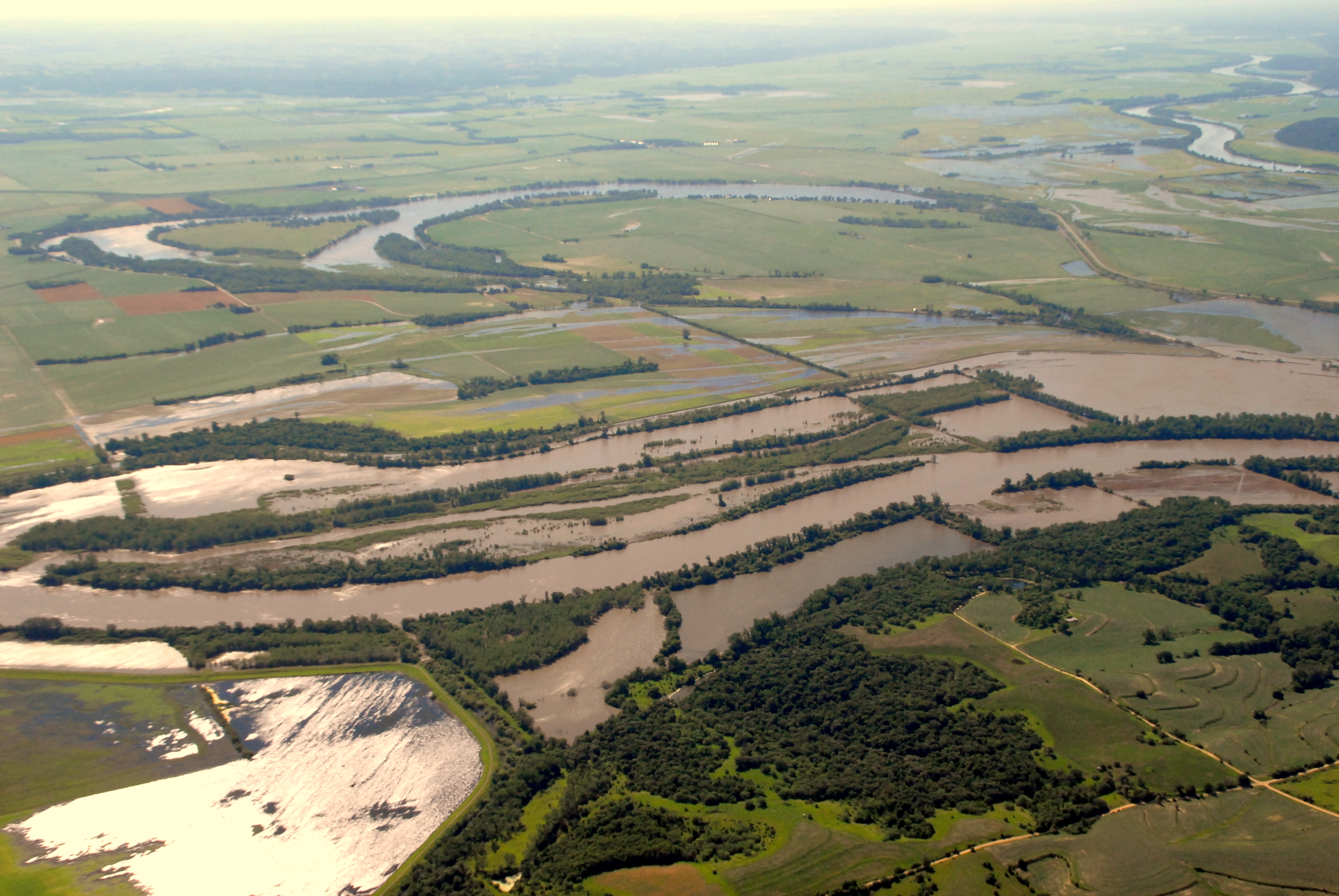
Big Lake (the curved area in the upper left) on June 15, 2011, during the 2011 Missouri River floods with the Missouri River in the foreground.

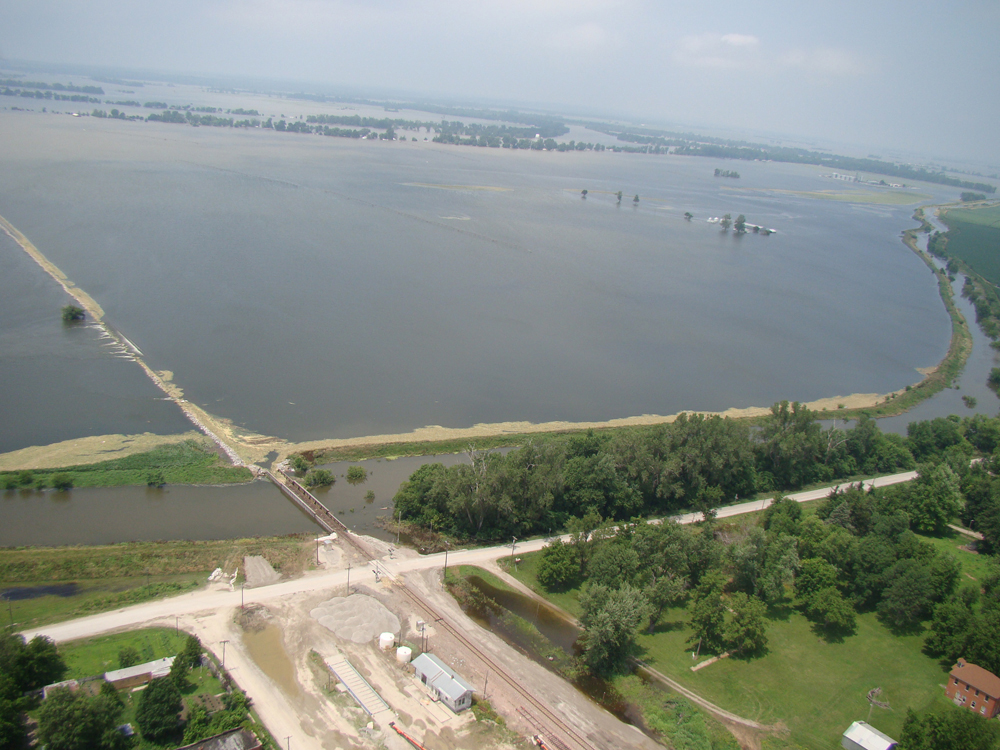
Big Lake from Fortescue, Missouri after being obliterated on June 26, 2011, in the flood

Big Lake is a village in western Holt County, Missouri, United States. The population was 65 at the 2020 census.

The village is located on the 646-acre (2.61 km^{2}) Big Lake, which is the largest oxbow lake in Missouri. It is also adjacent to Big Lake State Park, which has the largest marsh in a state park in the state of Missouri.

== History ==
Though the area has been inhabited for centuries, Big Lake was incorporated as a village in the 1990s primarily for the establishment of a municipal water system.

== Geography ==
Big Lake is eponymously named after the oxbow lake that was formerly part of the Missouri River. The lake was formed in the late 19th century when the river changed course, leaving the lake behind.

According to the United States Census Bureau, the village has a total area of 2.61 square miles (6.76 km^{2}), of which 1.64 square miles (4.25 km^{2}) is land and 0.97 square miles (2.51 km^{2}) is water.

Big Lake lies in the Missouri River floodplain and is approximately 5 miles (8.0 km) east of Rulo, Nebraska, 6 miles (9.7 km) west of Mound City, and 8 miles (13 km) south of Craig, Missouri.

== Demographics ==
Historical population
Census	Pop.	Note	%±
1990	170		—
2000	127		−25.3%
2010	159		25.2%
2020	65		−59.1%
U.S. Decennial Census

=== 2010 census ===
As of the census of 2010, there were 159 people, 84 households, and 50 families residing in the village. The population density was 97.0 inhabitants per square mile (37.5/km^{2}). There were 386 housing units at an average density of 235.4 per square mile (90.9/km^{2}). The racial makeup of the village was 97.5% White, 1.3% African American, and 1.3% Native American.

There were 84 households, of which 8.3% had children under the age of 18 living with them, 54.8% were married couples living together, 1.2% had a female householder with no husband present, 3.6% had a male householder with no wife present, and 40.5% were non-families. 39.3% of all households were made up of individuals, and 8.4% had someone living alone who was 65 years of age or older. The average household size was 1.89 and the average family size was 2.44.

The median age in the village was 55.6 years. 8.2% of residents were under the age of 18; 3.2% were between the ages of 18 and 24; 11.3% were from 25 to 44; 47.8% were from 45 to 64; and 29.6% were 65 years of age or older. The gender makeup of the village was 52.2% male and 47.8% female.

=== 2000 census ===
As of the census of 2000, there were 127 people, 60 households, and 37 families residing in the village. The population density was 75.0 inhabitants per square mile (29.0/km^{2}). There were 376 housing units at an average density of 222.0 per square mile (85.7/km^{2}). The racial makeup of the village was 98.43% White, 0.79% Native American, and 0.79% from two or more races.

There were 60 households, out of which 10.0% had children under the age of 18 living with them, 56.7% were married couples living together, 5.0% had a female householder with no husband present, and 36.7% were non-families. 33.3% of all households were made up of individuals, and 13.3% had someone living alone who was 65 years of age or older. The average household size was 2.12 and the average family size was 2.45.

In the village, the population was spread out, with 18.9% under the age of 18, 3.9% from 18 to 24, 15.0% from 25 to 44, 39.4% from 45 to 64, and 22.8% who were 65 years of age or older. The median age was 53 years. For every 100 females, there were 95.4 males. For every 100 females age 18 and over, there were 102.0 males.

The median income for a household in the village was $29,583, and the median income for a family was $40,417. Males had a median income of $31,806 versus $21,250 for females. The per capita income for the village was $27,243. There were 4.7% of families and 5.9% of the population living below the poverty line, including no under eighteens and 11.4% of those over 64.
