= Oregon, Missouri =

- City
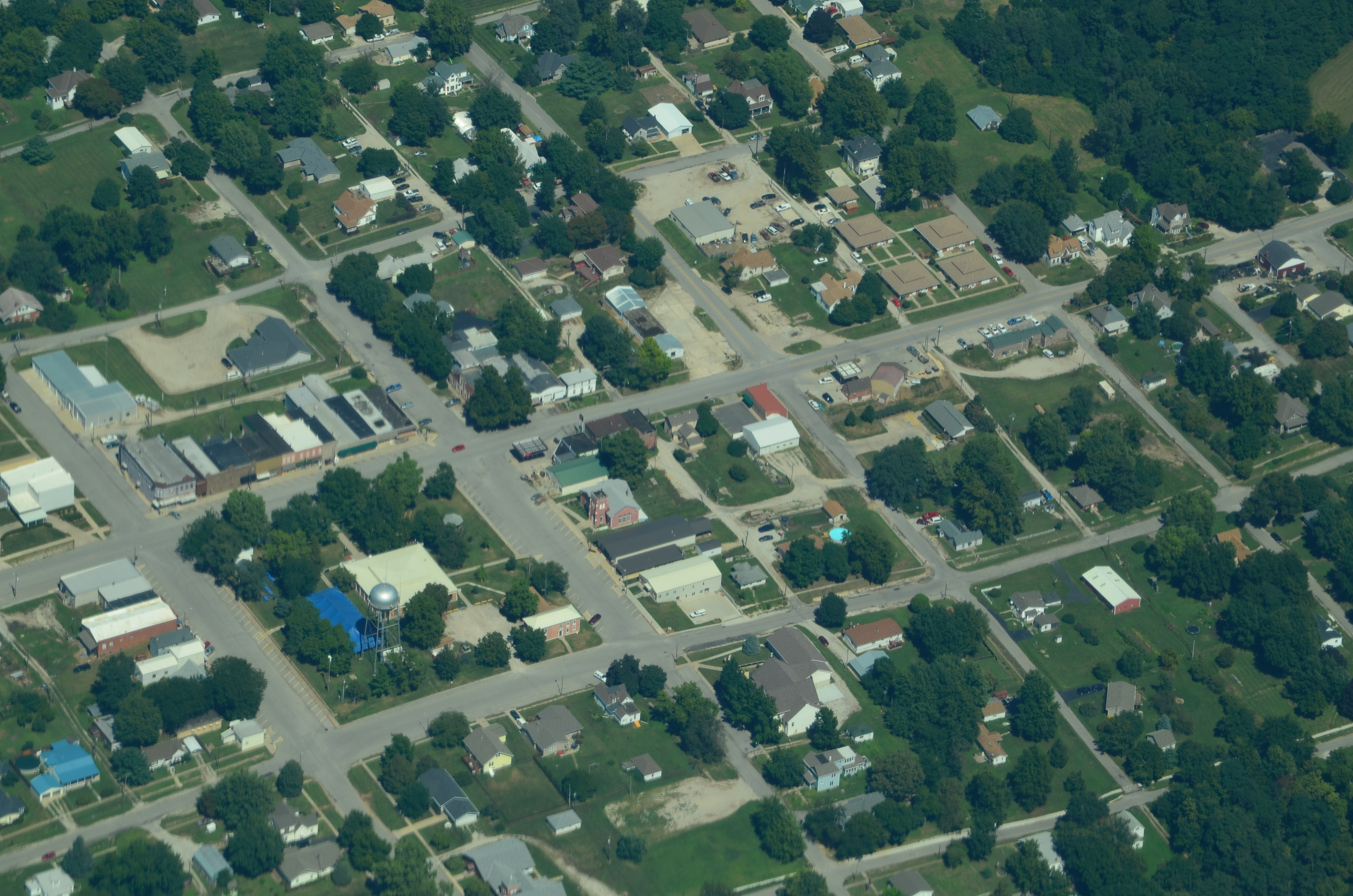
- Aerial view of Oregon, Missouri

- Location of Oregon, Missouri
- Coordinates: 39°59′10″N 95°08′36″W
- Country: United States
- State: Missouri
- County: Holt
- Township: Lewis

Area
  - Total: 0.93 sq mi (2.40 km^{2})
  - Land: 0.93 sq mi (2.40 km^{2})
  - Water: 0 sq mi (0.00 km^{2})
- Elevation: 1,089 ft (332 m)

Population (2020)
  - Total: 837
  - Density: 902.2/sq mi (348.35/km^{2})
- Time zone: UTC-6 (Central (CST))
  - Summer (DST): UTC-5 (CDT)
- ZIP code: 64473
- Area code: 660
- FIPS code: 29-54848
- GNIS feature ID: 2396076
- Website: www.cityoforegon.info

Oregon is a city and county seat of Holt County, Missouri, United States. The population was 837 at the 2020 census. It is the oldest town extant in Holt County.

== History ==
Oregon was originally called Finley, and under that name was platted in June 1841; it was replatted on October 21, 1841 as Oregon. The present name refers to the Oregon Country, which was at the time considered a prime destination of pioneer emigrants passing through the area. A post office called Oregon has been in operation since 1843. It was a significant trading post in the Platte Purchase region of Missouri for the first couple of decades of existence. In 1873, the Northwest Missouri Normal School was built in Oregon, at a cost of $22,000 ($586,000 in 2025 dollars).

== Geography ==
Oregon is located in the southern half of Holt County in the center of Lewis Township. Forest City lies about 2 miles west, and Holt County's largest town, Mound City is about 11 miles northwest. According to the United States Census Bureau, the city has a total area of 1.00 square mile (2.59 km^{2}), all land.

=== Transportation ===
Oregon is located on US 59 and has access to I-29 via both US 59 north and south. The eastern terminus of Route 111 is in Oregon.

=== Hydrology ===
Oregon is situated about 4.5 miles northeast of the Missouri River and is only 2 miles from the bluffs of the Missouri River Valley. The streams of Davis Branch and Mill Creek flank both sides of the town; Oregon sits relatively high on the hills between them.

== Demographics ==
Historical population
Census	Pop.	Note	%±
1860	720		—
1870	824		14.4%
1880	862		4.6%
1890	948		10.0%
1900	1,032		8.9%
1910	1,002		−2.9%
1920	904		−9.8%
1930	922		2.0%
1940	978		6.1%
1950	870		−11.0%
1960	887		2.0%
1970	789		−11.0%
1980	901		14.2%
1990	935		3.8%
2000	935		0.0%
2010	857		−8.3%
2020	837		−2.3%
U.S. Decennial Census

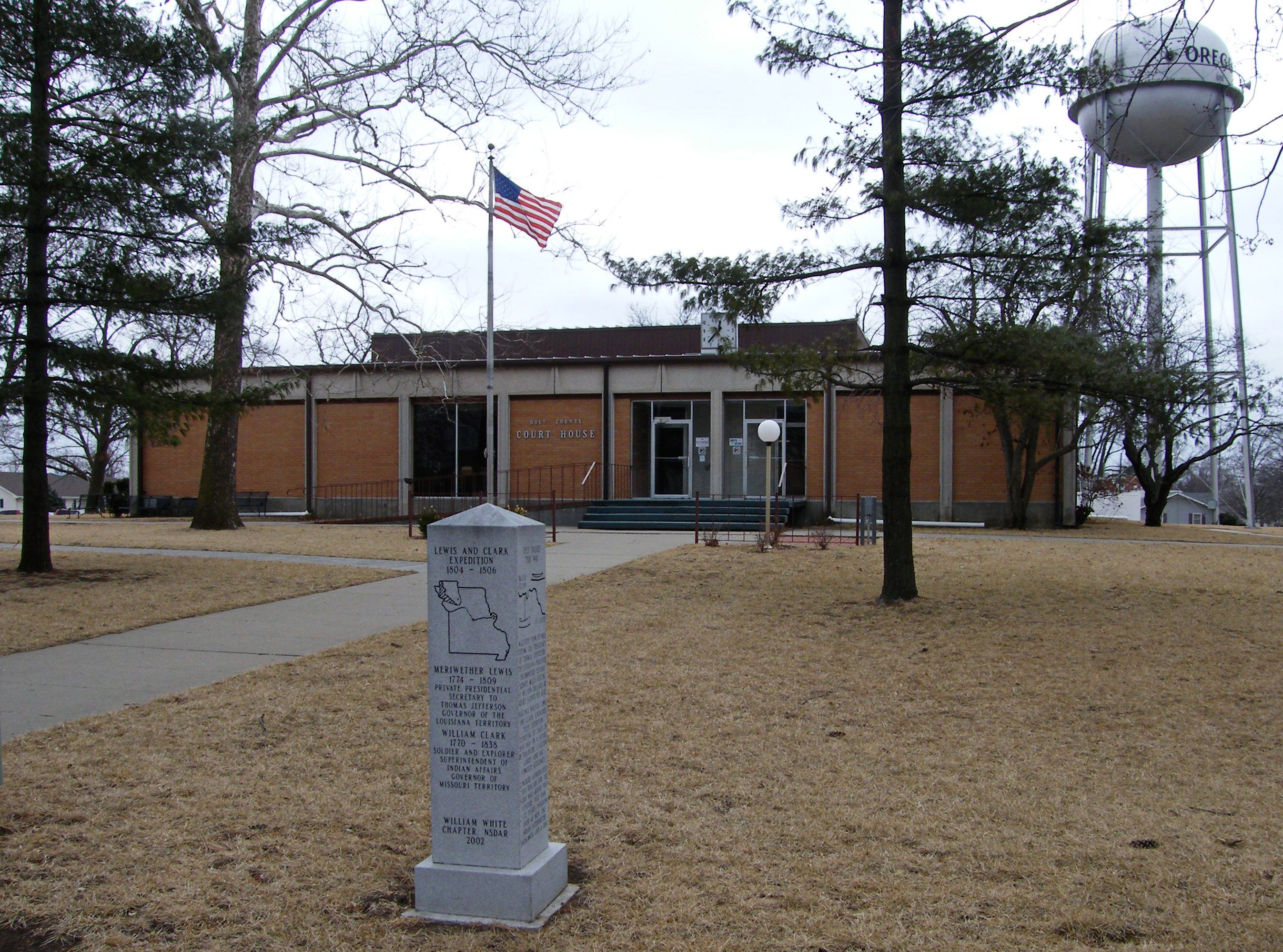
Holt County Courthouse in Oregon

=== 2010 census ===
As of the census of 2010, there were 857 people, 356 households, and 235 families living in the city. The population density was 857.0 inhabitants per square mile (330.9/km^{2}). There were 401 housing units at an average density of 401.0 per square mile (154.8/km^{2}). The racial makeup of the city was 98.4% White, 0.5% Native American, 0.5% Asian, and 0.7% from two or more races. Hispanic or Latino of any race were 0.2% of the population.

There were 356 households, of which 27.2% had children under the age of 18 living with them, 55.3% were married couples living together, 7.3% had a female householder with no husband present, 3.4% had a male householder with no wife present, and 34.0% were non-families. 29.5% of all households were made up of individuals, and 17.2% had someone living alone who was 65 years of age or older. The average household size was 2.26 and the average family size was 2.79.

The median age in the city was 45.4 years. 19.7% of residents were under the age of 18; 7.1% were between the ages of 18 and 24; 22.7% were from 25 to 44; 28.4% were from 45 to 64; and 21.9% were 65 years of age or older. The gender makeup of the city was 48.5% male and 51.5% female.

=== 2000 census ===
As of the census of 2000, there were 935 people, 348 households, and 243 families living in the city. The population density was 931.0 inhabitants per square mile (359.5/km^{2}). There were 395 housing units at an average density of 393.3 per square mile (151.9/km^{2}). The racial makeup of the city was 98.40% White, 0.53% Native American, 0.11% Asian, 0.11% Pacific Islander, and 0.86% from two or more races. Hispanic or Latino of any race were 0.11% of the population.

There were 348 households, out of which 34.8% had children under the age of 18 living with them, 58.6% were married couples living together, 7.8% had a female householder with no husband present, and 29.9% were non-families. 27.3% of all households were made up of individuals, and 16.1% had someone living alone who was 65 years of age or older. The average household size was 2.52 and the average family size was 3.08.

In the city, the population was spread out, with 26.4% under the age of 18, 6.5% from 18 to 24, 26.3% from 25 to 44, 18.6% from 45 to 64, and 22.1% who were 65 years of age or older. The median age was 38 years. For every 100 females, there were 88.1 males. For every 100 females age 18 and over, there were 80.6 males.

The median income for a household in the city was $34,250, and the median income for a family was $41,932. Males had a median income of $33,750 versus $18,417 for females. The per capita income for the city was $15,441. About 5.3% of families and 7.5% of the population were below the poverty line, including 6.1% of those under age 18 and 7.1% of those age 65 or over.

== Education ==
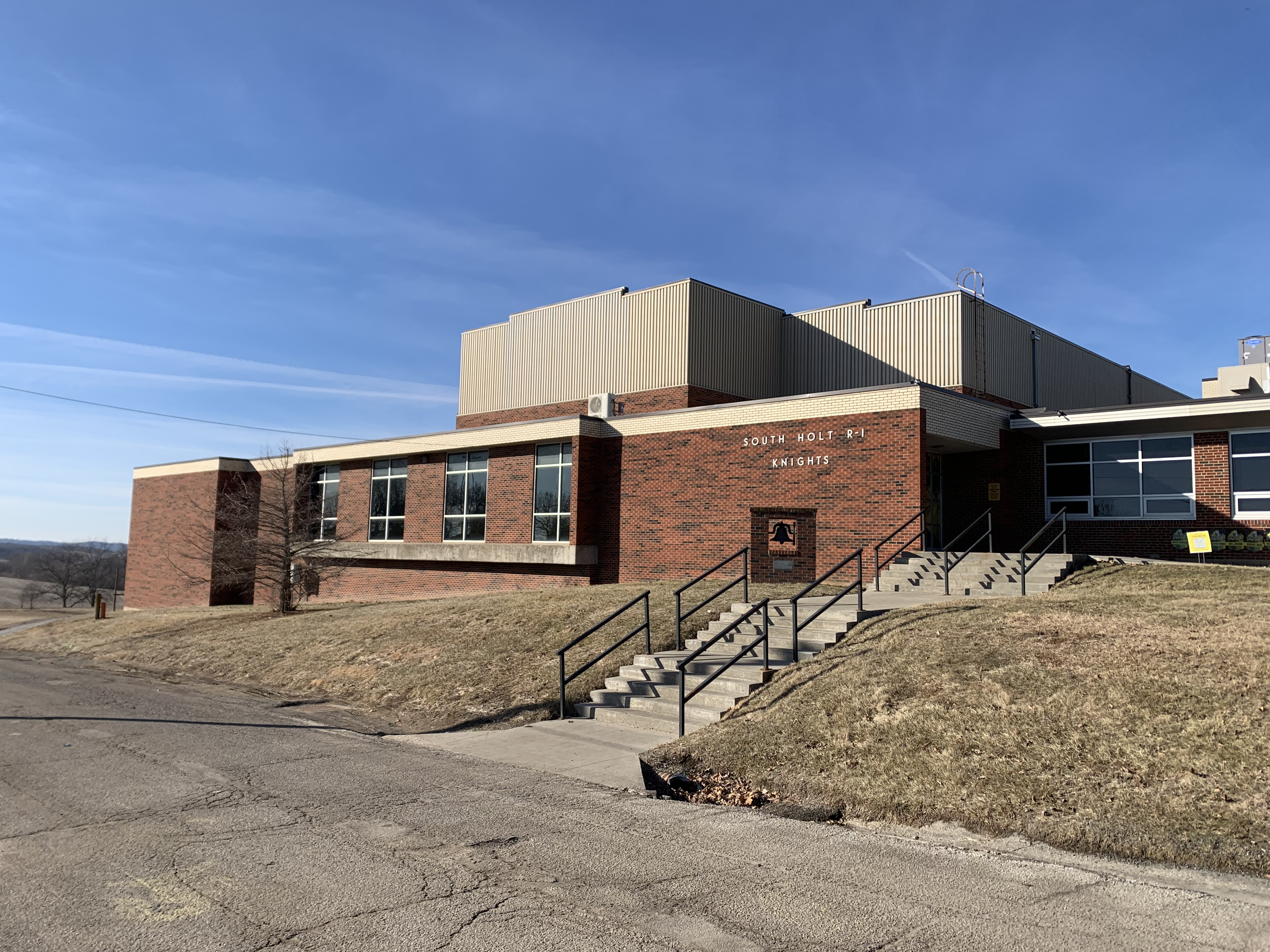
South Holt R-1 School in Oregon, Missouri

The 1928 Oregon boys' basketball, which featured future University of Missouri coach Wilbur Stalcup, won the state basketball tournament at a time when Missouri did not have divisions for its schools. The team reached the quarterfinals of the National Interscholastic Basketball Tournament to determine a national champion. At the time, Oregon did not have a gymnasium. Oregon's team consisted of a total of 10 players. It practiced on an outdoor court and occasionally inside the Methodist Church.

The Holt County Museum & Research Center is located in Oregon, Missouri.

Oregon has a lending library, the Oregon Public Library.

== Notable people ==
- Edward Coke Crow, former United States Democratic Attorney General
- Wilbur Stalcup, former University of Missouri basketball head coach

== See also ==
- Nave & McCord Mercantile Company
