= Big Lake State Park =

State park in Missouri, United States

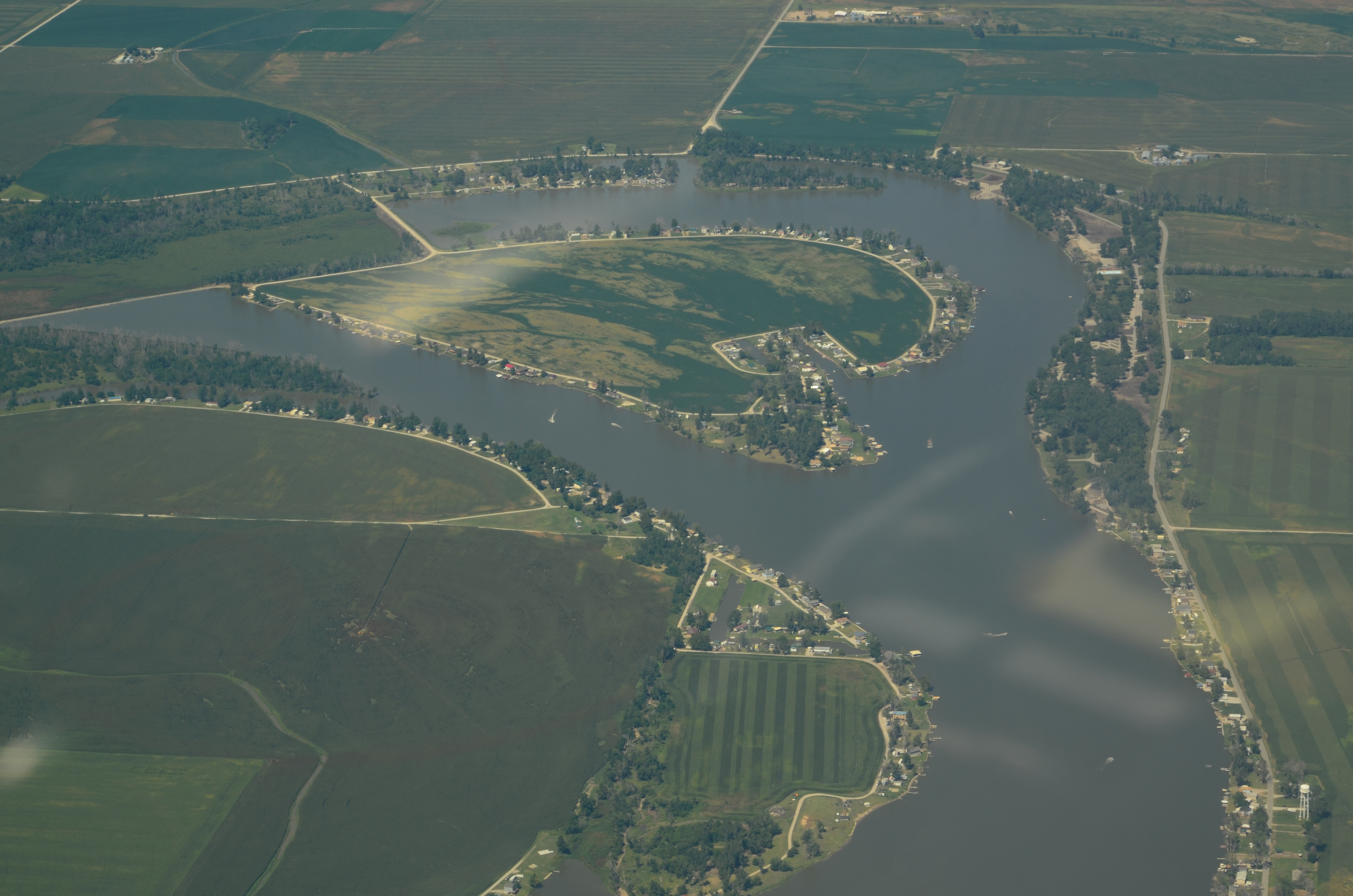
- Big Lake and Big Lake State Park from the air

- Location within Missouri Location within the United States
- Location: Holt County, Missouri, United States
- Coordinates: 40°05′05″N 95°20′35″W
- Area: 407.41 acres (164.87 ha)
- Elevation: 860 ft (260 m)
- Established: 1932
- Administrator: Missouri Department of Natural Resources
- Visitors: 111,949 (in 2022)
- Website: Official website

Big Lake State Park is a public recreation area located in northwest Missouri, United States. The 407-acre (165 ha) state park was established in 1932 at the northern end of the state's largest oxbow lake, Big Lake. Park activities include boating, camping, picnicking, fishing, and swimming. Because park accommodations have been repeatedly destroyed by Missouri River floods, the park began using wheeled rental cabins that can be moved in the event of flooding in 2016.
