= Craig, Missouri =

- City
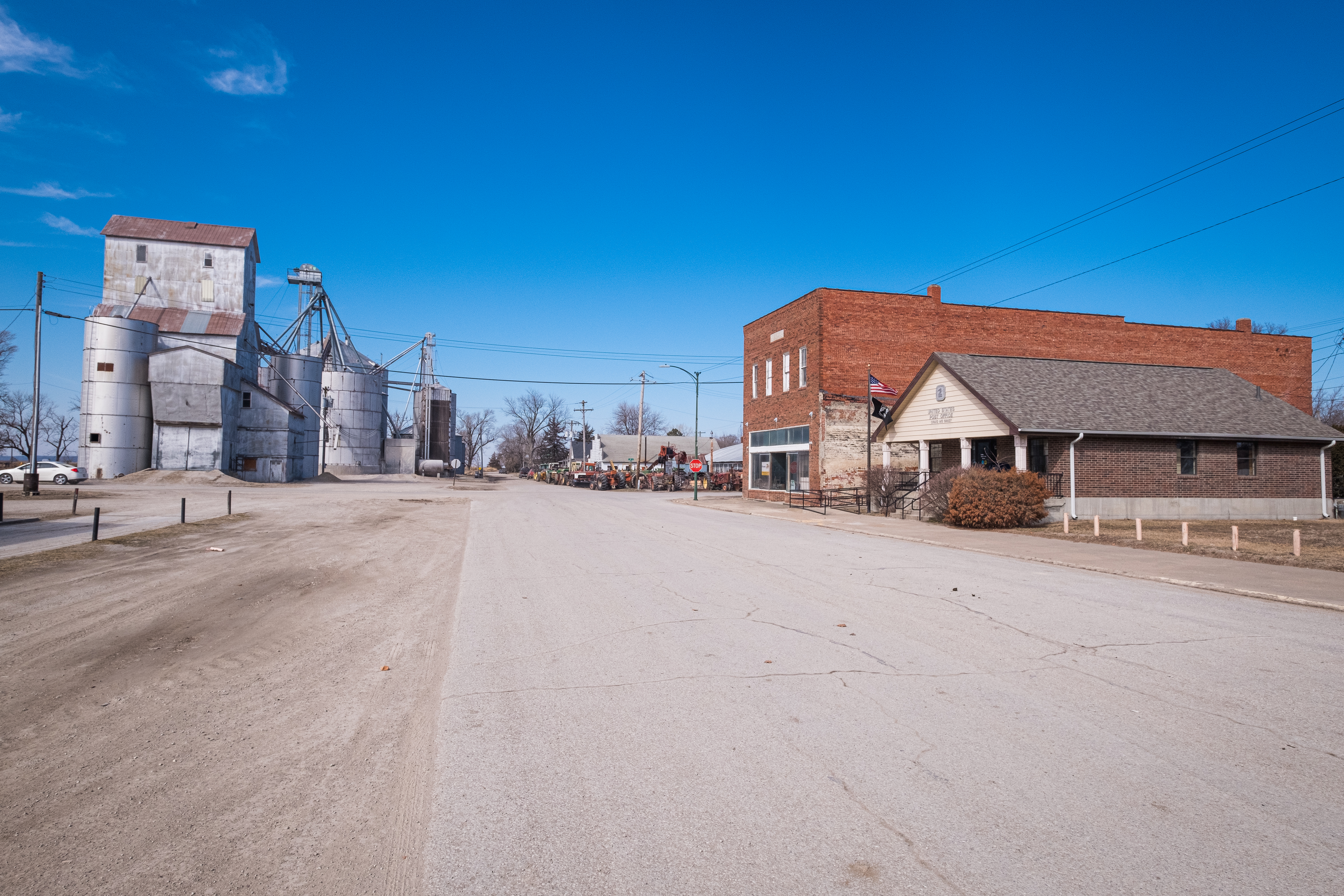

- Location of Craig, Missouri
- Coordinates: 40°11′33″N 95°22′27″W
- Country: United States
- State: Missouri
- County: Holt
- Township: Union

Area
  - Total: 0.26 sq mi (0.67 km^{2})
  - Land: 0.26 sq mi (0.67 km^{2})
  - Water: 0 sq mi (0.00 km^{2})
- Elevation: 869 ft (265 m)

Population (2020)
  - Total: 105
  - Density: 404.6/sq mi (156.22/km^{2})
- Time zone: UTC-6 (Central (CST))
  - Summer (DST): UTC-5 (CDT)
- ZIP code: 64437
- Area code: 660
- FIPS code: 29-17056
- GNIS feature ID: 2393661

Craig is a city in northwestern Holt County, Missouri, United States. The population was 105 at the 2020 census.

== History ==
Craig was laid out in 1869. The city was named after the attorney and Missouri politician Gen. James Craig. A post office also named Craig has been in operation since 1869.

The BNSF railroad still runs trains daily through Craig on the Napier Subdivision.

== Geography ==
The city of Craig lies in the eastern floodplain of the Missouri River and the Burlington Northern Railroad crosses through the town. It also lies just west of the juncture between US Route 59 and Interstate 29. Corning lies 5.5 miles northwest, Mound City is 9 miles southeast, and Fairfax, in adjacent Atchison County, is about 10 miles north.

Craig is located where the Little Tarkio Creek entered the Missouri floodplains, before its channelization, now it is a few miles east.

According to the United States Census Bureau, the city has a total area of 0.27 square miles (0.70 km^{2}), all land.

== Demographics ==
Historical population
Census	Pop.	Note	%±
1880	541		—
1890	503		−7.0%
1900	775		54.1%
1910	621		−19.9%
1920	642		3.4%
1930	626		−2.5%
1940	718		14.7%
1950	578		−19.5%
1960	488		−15.6%
1970	369		−24.4%
1980	379		2.7%
1990	346		−8.7%
2000	309		−10.7%
2010	248		−19.7%
2020	105		−57.7%
U.S. Decennial Census

=== 2010 census ===
As of the census of 2010, there were 248 people, 110 households, and 67 families living in the city. The population density was 918.5 inhabitants per square mile (354.6/km^{2}). There were 137 housing units at an average density of 507.4 per square mile (195.9/km^{2}). The racial makeup of the city was 99.2% White, 0.4% Native American, and 0.4% from other races. Hispanic or Latino of any race were 0.8% of the population.

There were 110 households, of which 25.5% had children under the age of 18 living with them, 44.5% were married couples living together, 10.0% had a female householder with no husband present, 6.4% had a male householder with no wife present, and 39.1% were non-families. 31.8% of all households were made up of individuals, and 15.4% had someone living alone who was 65 years of age or older. The average household size was 2.25 and the average family size was 2.81.

The median age in the city was 47 years. 18.1% of residents were under the age of 18; 10.5% were between the ages of 18 and 24; 18.8% were from 25 to 44; 33.2% were from 45 to 64; and 19.4% were 65 years of age or older. The gender makeup of the city was 49.6% male and 50.4% female.

=== 2000 census ===
As of the census of 2000, there were 309 people, 131 households, and 77 families living in the city. The population density was 1,120.0 inhabitants per square mile (432.4/km^{2}). There were 154 housing units at an average density of 558.2 per square mile (215.5/km^{2}). The racial makeup of the city was 99.68% White, and 0.32% from two or more races. Hispanic or Latino of any race were 0.32% of the population.

There were 131 households, out of which 29.8% had children under the age of 18 living with them, 47.3% were married couples living together, 6.1% had a female householder with no husband present, and 40.5% were non-families. 36.6% of all households were made up of individuals, and 22.1% had someone living alone who was 65 years of age or older. The average household size was 2.36 and the average family size was 3.15.

In the city the population was spread out, with 26.5% under the age of 18, 10.0% from 18 to 24, 22.3% from 25 to 44, 21.4% from 45 to 64, and 19.7% who were 65 years of age or older. The median age was 38 years. For every 100 females, there were 100.6 males. For every 100 females age 18 and over, there were 97.4 males.

The median income for a household in the city was $22,500, and the median income for a family was $26,750. Males had a median income of $30,114 versus $15,625 for females. The per capita income for the city was $10,719. About 14.5% of families and 17.9% of the population were below the poverty line, including 14.5% of those under the age of eighteen and 23.1% of those 65 or over.
