= Forest City, Missouri =

City in Missouri, U.S.

- City
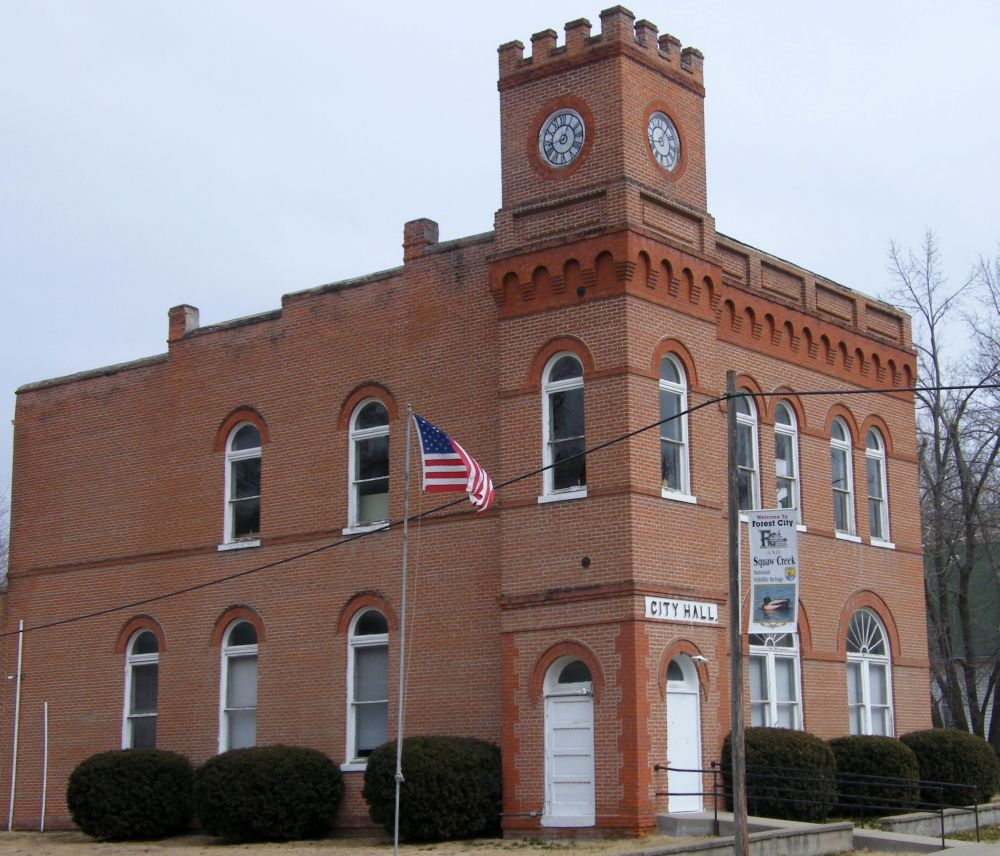
- City Hall on the National Register of Historic Places

- Location of Forest City, Missouri
- Coordinates: 39°58′59″N 95°11′18″W
- Country: United States
- State: Missouri
- County: Holt
- Township: Forest

Area
  - Total: 0.98 sq mi (2.53 km^{2})
  - Land: 0.98 sq mi (2.53 km^{2})
  - Water: 0 sq mi (0.00 km^{2})
- Elevation: 951 ft (290 m)

Population (2020)
  - Total: 243
  - Density: 248.3/sq mi (95.88/km^{2})
- Time zone: UTC-6 (Central (CST))
  - Summer (DST): UTC-5 (CDT)
- ZIP code: 64451
- Area code: 660
- FIPS code: 29-25066
- GNIS feature ID: 2394788

Forest City is a city in Holt County, Missouri, United States. The population was 243 at the 2020 census.

== History ==
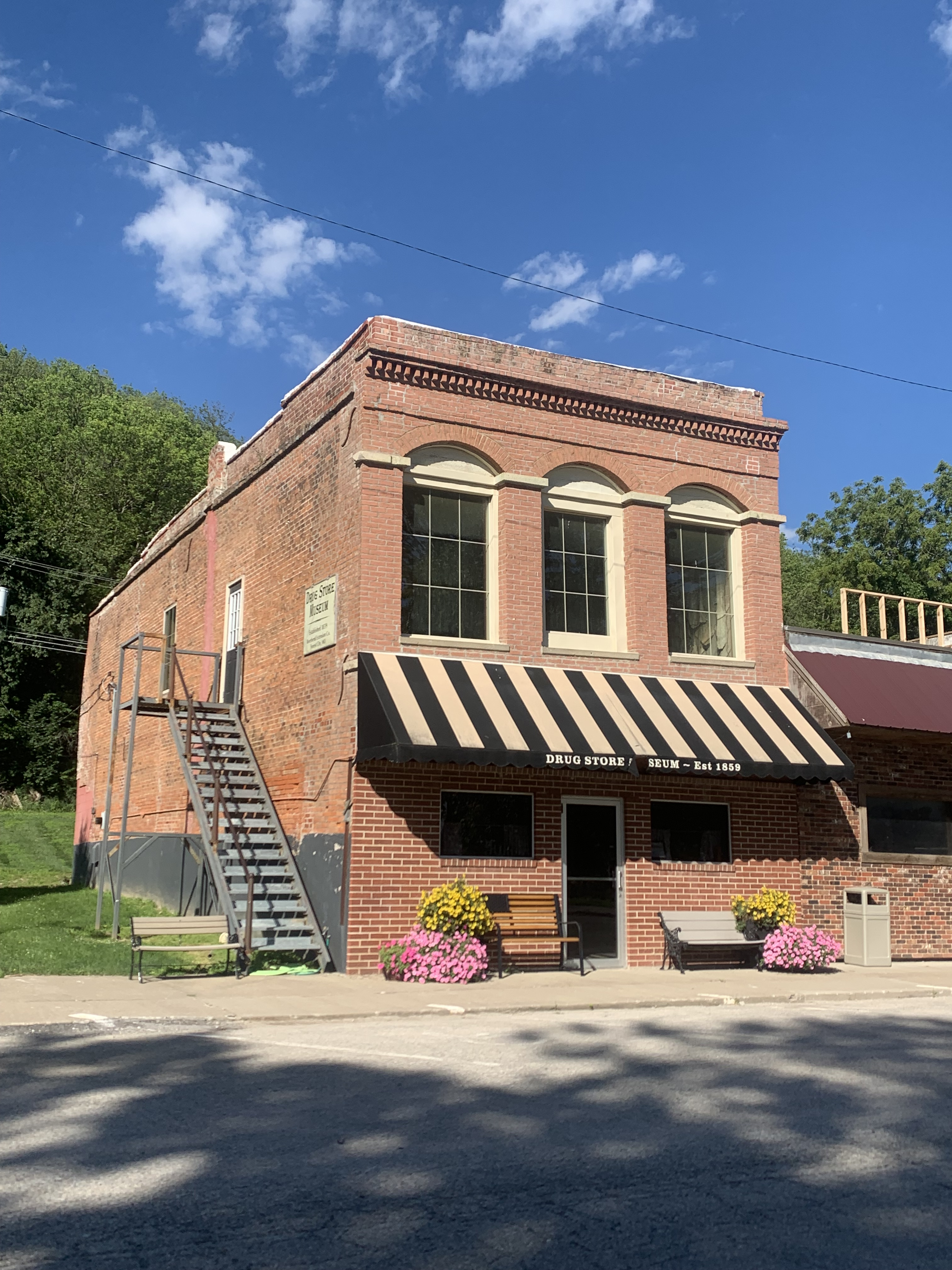
Historic museum in Forest City

Forest City was platted on May 16, 1857, with later additions being filed in 1868. The city was named from the dense forest near the original the town site. A post office called Forest City has been in operation since 1857. The town was incorporated in 1861 and has also been spelled 'Forrest'.

Forest City was originally a significant trading post on the Missouri River but in the 1868 Missouri River flood, the river rerouted to the west. At its peak, 13 steamboats were moored in the docks.

City Hall was listed on the National Register of Historic Places in 1980.

The BNSF railroad still runs trains daily through Forest City on the Napier Subdivision.

== Geography ==
Forest City was originally located on the bank of the Missouri River but the river receded westward, and it now lies over 2.5 miles away.

According to the United States Census Bureau, the city has a total area of 0.99 square miles (2.56 km^{2}), all land.

== Demographics ==
Historical population
Census	Pop.	Note	%±
1860	350		—
1870	676		93.1%
1880	421		−37.7%
1890	428		1.7%
1900	632		47.7%
1910	634		0.3%
1920	593		−6.5%
1930	504		−15.0%
1940	548		8.7%
1950	484		−11.7%
1960	435		−10.1%
1970	365		−16.1%
1980	387		6.0%
1990	380		−1.8%
2000	338		−11.1%
2010	268		−20.7%
2020	243		−9.3%
U.S. Decennial Census

=== 2010 census ===
As of the census of 2010, there were 268 people, 117 households, and 70 families residing in the city. The population density was 270.7 inhabitants per square mile (104.5/km^{2}). There were 147 housing units at an average density of 148.5 per square mile (57.3/km^{2}). The racial makeup of the city was 95.5% White, 1.1% Native American, 2.2% from other races, and 1.1% from two or more races. Hispanic or Latino of any race were 2.2% of the population.

There were 117 households, of which 26.5% had children under the age of 18 living with them, 51.3% were married couples living together, 4.3% had a female householder with no husband present, 4.3% had a male householder with no wife present, and 40.2% were non-families. 34.2% of all households were made up of individuals, and 16.3% had someone living alone who was 65 years of age or older. The average household size was 2.29 and the average family size was 2.94.

The median age in the city was 43.8 years. 22.4% of residents were under the age of 18; 7.4% were between the ages of 18 and 24; 21.6% were from 25 to 44; 31.7% were from 45 to 64; and 16.8% were 65 years of age or older. The gender makeup of the city was 53.4% male and 46.6% female.

=== 2000 census ===
As of the census of 2000, there were 338 people, 139 households, and 91 families residing in the city. The population density was 346.3 inhabitants per square mile (133.7/km^{2}). There were 148 housing units at an average density of 151.6 per square mile (58.5/km^{2}). The racial makeup of the city was 96.15% White, 0.89% African American, 0.59% Native American, and 2.37% from two or more races.

There were 139 households, out of which 29.5% had children under the age of 18 living with them, 54.0% were married couples living together, 6.5% had a female householder with no husband present, and 34.5% were non-families. 28.8% of all households were made up of individuals, and 16.5% had someone living alone who was 65 years of age or older. The average household size was 2.43 and the average family size was 3.05.

In the city the population was spread out, with 25.4% under the age of 18, 6.2% from 18 to 24, 30.5% from 25 to 44, 22.5% from 45 to 64, and 15.4% who were 65 years of age or older. The median age was 38 years. For every 100 females, there were 98.8 males. For every 100 females age 18 and over, there were 89.5 males.

The median income for a household in the city was $31,016, and the median income for a family was $32,500. Males had a median income of $25,893 versus $16,500 for females. The per capita income for the city was $18,671. About 1.0% of families and 4.4% of the population were below the poverty line, including 2.4% of those under age 18 and 13.6% of those age 65 or over.
