= Helwig =

Germanic surname

- Language: German, Dutch

Origin
- Origin: Old High German
- Meaning: patronymic or metronymic from the medieval given name Heilwig
- Region of origin: German-speaking Europe

Other names
- Variant forms: Hellwig, Helwich, Hellweg, Helbig, Halbig, Hilbig, Helvig, Helvey, Helwing

Helwig is a surname of Germanic origin, found chiefly in Germany, the Netherlands and the United States. It belongs to a cluster of related forms — including Hellwig, Helwich, Helbig, Halbig and Hilbig — which the standard German surname dictionaries treat as spellings of a single underlying name derived from the medieval personal name Heilwig.

Heilwig was itself a woman's name, current in the German-speaking lands from the 11th century and largely extinct as a forename by the end of the 15th. The surname is polygenetic: onomastic reference works note that surnames of this kind arose independently in many places wherever the personal name was borne, and that bearers of a common surname are not necessarily related to one another.

== Etymology ==
=== The personal name Heilwig ===
The surname derives from the dithematic Germanic personal name Heilwig, formed, like most early Germanic names, from two elements combined as building blocks.

Ernst Förstemann files the name under the stem HAILA, which he glosses from Old High German heil "salvus, sanus" (whole, sound). He records the form Hailwich as both masculine and feminine, first attested in the 11th century, alongside the variants Hailwic, Heilwich, Heilewic, Heylewig and Heilwic, and identifies the modern surnames Helbig and Hellwig as its descendants. The Dictionary of Medieval Names from European Sources treats Heilwig as feminine and derives it from Old High German heil "whole" with Old Saxon wig / Old High German wīc "war, battle".

The same dictionary notes that the name is sometimes confused with Hedwig, which is a different formation. Förstemann files Hedwig under the separate stem HATHU, from hadu "battle", and dates its earliest attestation two centuries before that of Heilwig.

=== Use and decline as a given name ===
Heilwig was in use as a personal name, chiefly for women, for roughly four centuries. Joachim Hartig's study of late medieval forenames in the Münsterland records the name from 1252, when a Helwigis appears as abbess of Freckenhorst, through attestations of 1280, 1295, 1324, 1354 and 1392, to a final full-form instance, Heylewech at Dülmen, in 1426. The Dictionary of Medieval Names from European Sources independently records dated citations from 1238 (Heilewigis) through 1252, 1255, 1259, 1271 and 1276 to 1323 (Heylwich).

The dithematic full form then disappears. In Hartig's largest corpus, the Münsterland tax registers of 1498–99 covering some 12,000 men and 2,850 women, Heilewig is absent altogether, while the short forms Heile, Heilike and Heylke remain in use.

The disappearance follows the general fate of Germanic forenames. Hartig dates the influx of biblical and saints' names to about 1170, describes it as arriving in flood during the 13th century, and considers the transformation essentially complete by the beginning of the 14th; by 1498 roughly a third of Münsterland men and over two-fifths of women bore a name of foreign origin, with Johan alone accounting for 29 per cent of men. The name survives today almost entirely as a surname; the Dutch given-name database records that Helwig was not given to any child in 2017, though it has been borne in the Netherlands by both men and women in the past.

=== Interpretations of the surname ===
The Digitales Familiennamenwörterbuch Deutschlands (DFD), a standard dictionary of German surnames, gives several readings in ranked order. As its principal interpretations it treats Hellwig as a patronymic either to the given name Heilwig (Old High German heil, Old Saxon hēl "whole, healthy" + Old High German and Old Saxon wīg "battle") or to the given name Helmwig (helm "helmet" + wīg "battle"). In individual cases it allows a metronymic reading, to Heilwig understood instead as heil + wīh "holy". Two further patronymic readings, to Hildwig and to Halwig, are expressly marked as uncertain. The Dutch surname database, by contrast, classes the name as a metronym to the Germanic female name hail-wîg.

The second element is therefore not settled between wīg "battle" and wīh "holy". Reference works also differ on the first element, the Dictionary of American Family Names rendering heil as "luck" where the German dictionaries render it "whole, sound".

Because Heilwig was originally a woman's name, a metronymic derivation is possible. Metronyms are uncommon in German; where they occur, the standard explanations given are that the mother was of markedly higher social standing or greater wealth than the father, that the child was born outside marriage, or that the father died early.

In either reading the surname is the bare personal name used unchanged, without a genitive or other affix of the kind found in many patronymic surnames; the Dutch surname database classifies it explicitly as a patronym with no affix.

=== Spelling variants ===
The Dictionary of American Family Names records Helwig as "German and Dutch", treats Hellwig as a variant of it, derives Helbig and Halbig from the same personal name, and identifies Helvey as an Americanised form of German Helwig. The Danish and Norwegian surname Helvig is a separate but comparable formation.

The forms in -lb- (Helbig, Hilbig, Halbig) reflect an East Central German sound change of medial lw to lb, paralleled in Middle High German swalwe becoming modern German Schwalbe "swallow". The -lb- spellings consequently cluster in Saxony, Silesia and Thuringia, while -lw- predominates elsewhere. The dictionaries nonetheless treat all of these as one name.

== Formation as a hereditary surname ==
Hereditary second names appeared first in Venice in the 9th century, spreading in the 10th century to the rest of Italy and southern France, in the 11th to northern France and Catalonia, and in the 12th to the towns of western and southern Germany. Within the German-speaking area the two-part system of given name plus family name diffused between the 12th and 15th centuries, running from south and west to north and east, from the towns into the countryside, and from noble families to burghers and last of all to the peasantry. By about 1400 almost everyone in the German-speaking lands bore a family name, though the practice was not yet universal.

Heuser identifies two pressures behind the change. The first was a shortage of given names: from the 12th century biblical and saints' names were increasingly preferred and the older Germanic given names were pushed aside, impoverishing the stock of forenames. In Mainz in 1401, 63 of 291 recorded men were called Johannes. The second was proprietary. Mischke argues that a stable, transmissible name secured unambiguous reference to a person and to the inheritable claims, holdings, offices and social positions attached to that person, which is why the nobility and the wealthier townspeople adopted fixed second names earliest.

The two developments intersect in a name like Helwig. Heuser observes that Germanic given names which fell out of fashion as forenames were nonetheless preserved as surnames, and describes surnames as conserving older states of the language, so functioning as linguistic fossils. On her account a second name remained a mere byname as long as it changed between generations, and became a family name only once it was inherited regardless of whether it still fitted its bearer. In parts of southern and western Germany and the Alpine region the Hofname custom worked against inheritance, a man marrying into a farm taking the farm's name; in Westphalia the practice was restricted by Prussian regulation in 1822 and 1828, which permitted the farm name only as an addition introduced by genannt.

The DFD cautions that surname scholarship is methodologically distinct from genealogy, and that a shared etymology does not establish shared descent.

== Early attestations ==
The personal name is attested long before the surname. A Heilwig, wife of Count Welf and mother of the empress Judith, was abbess of Chelles from about 825 and died on 5 November in or after 833; she appears in the sources not as Heilwig but as Eigilwi in Thegan's Vita Hludowici and as Hegilwich in the Translatio S. Baltechildis.

As a hereditary byname the earliest dated examples are Silesian. Hans Bahlow's Schlesisches Namenbuch records the name as widespread around Liegnitz, Görlitz and Grätz, and lists Helwig de Boleslawicz at Brieg in 1264, Helwicus de Molnsdorf in 1357, a Helwig son of Nickel Mertin at Brieg in 1357, Hentschil Helwyg von Lemberg in 1357, Hanns Helwiger at Görlitz in 1468 and Christoff Hilbiger at Görlitz in 1496. The Dutch surname database adds Hans Helbig at Freiberg in 1426, recorded a year later as Hans Helliwig, and Willem Helwich at Moers in 1564.

In south-western Germany, a Melchior Hellweg is recorded as Catholic parish priest of Löchgau in Württemberg before 1531.

== Historical bearers ==
=== Church and scholarship ===
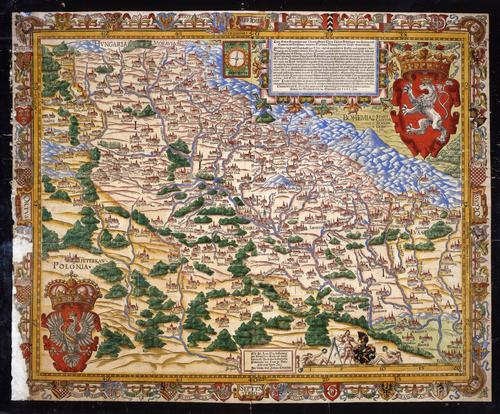
Silesiae Typus, Martin Helwig's 1561 map of Silesia, the first based on his own surveys

- Helwicus Teutonicus (fl. c. 1300), also called Helwig von Germar, a Dominican friar and lector at the Erfurt convent, belonged to the circle of pupils around Meister Eckhart and wrote the Liber de eo quod est maximum mandatum and a Liber exemplorum.
- Martin Helwig (1516–1574), born at Neisse, studied at Wittenberg under Luther and Melanchthon and headed the Maria-Magdalenen-Gymnasium at Breslau from 1560. His woodcut Silesiae Typus of 1561 was the first map of Silesia based on his own surveys, and Abraham Ortelius incorporated it into the Theatrum Orbis Terrarum. It carries one of the earliest depictions of Rübezahl.
- Christoph Helvig (1581–1617), professor of Hebrew and Greek at Giessen and a chronologist in the tradition of Scaliger, whose Theatrum historicum et chronologicum was reprinted into the 18th century.
- Andreas Helwig (1572–1643), rector of the Gymnasium zum Grauen Kloster in Berlin from 1612, professor of poetry at Rostock from 1615 and thereafter rector of the Stralsund Gymnasium until his death; author of Antichristus Romanus (1612) and of the early etymological work Origines dictionum germanicarum.
- Georg Helwich (1588–1632), vicar of Mainz Cathedral and an early historian of the archdiocese, who travelled the diocese between 1611 and 1623 recording some 1,200 inscriptions and 2,300 coats of arms in his manuscript Syntagma monumentorum et epitaphiorum.
- Jakob Helwig the Elder (1600–1651), pastor at St Mary's in Berlin and provost at Cölln an der Spree.
- Jakob Helwig the Younger (1631–1684), born at Pritzwalk, rector of the Gymnasium zum Grauen Kloster in 1658 and chief pastor of the German congregation in Stockholm from 1673, was appointed Lutheran bishop of Estonia at Reval and president of the consistory on 1 July 1677. He received 800 silver thalers from Charles XI towards printing a thousand copies of the New Testament in Reval Estonian.
- Georg Andreas Helwing (1666–1748), Lutheran theologian and botanist, provost and superintendent of Angerburg from 1725 and a member of the Prussian Academy of Sciences from 1709; the plant genus Helwingia is named after him.

=== Science and invention ===
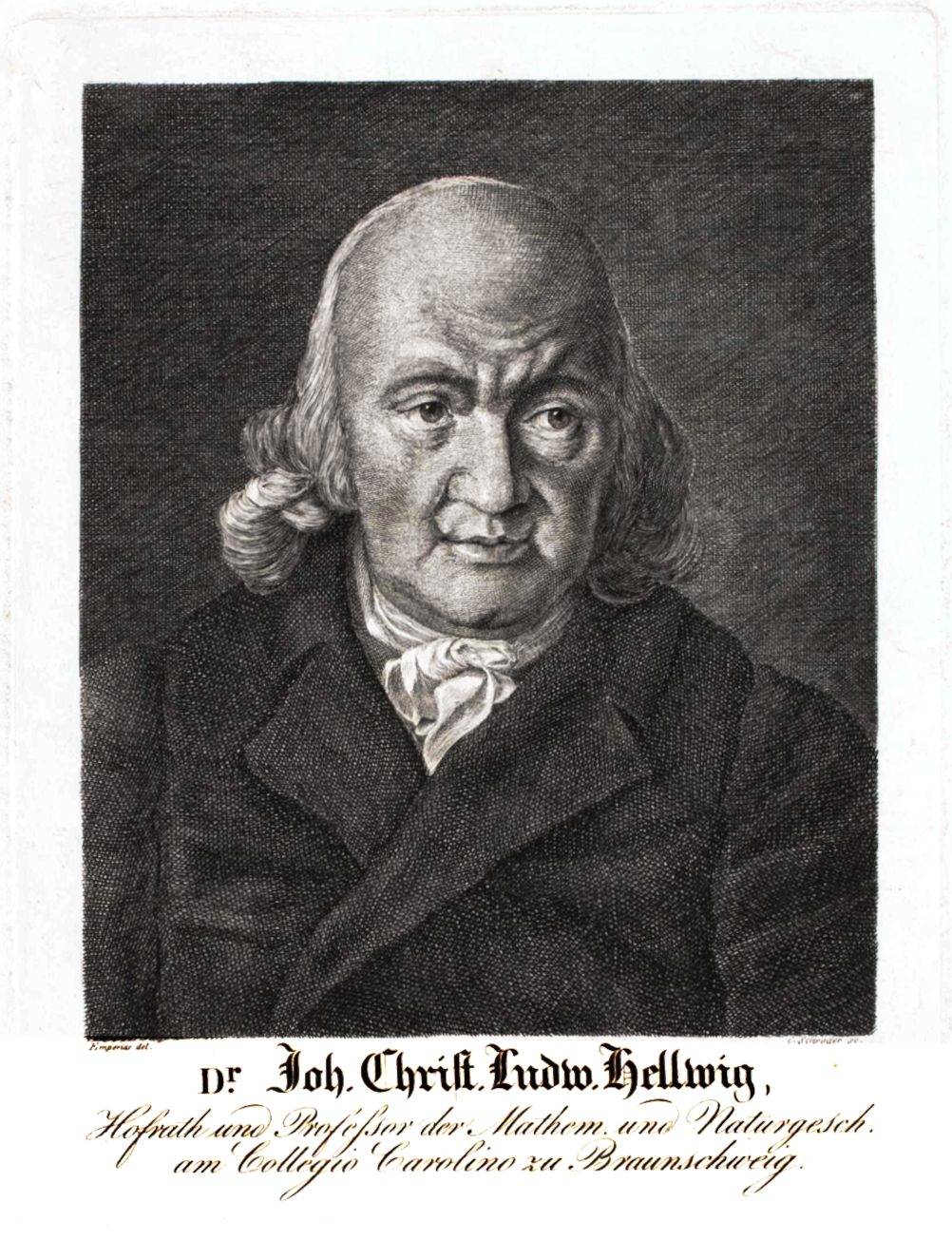
Johann Christian Ludwig Hellwig (1743–1831)

Johann Christian Ludwig Hellwig (1743–1831), born at Gartz an der Oder, taught mathematics and natural science at the Collegium Carolinum in Brunswick, where he held the chair from 1802 until his death and numbered Carl Friedrich Gauss among his pupils.

He is best known for Versuch eines aufs Schachspiel gebaueten taktischen Spiels (Leipzig, 1780), generally regarded as the first wargame. Devised to teach tactics to pupils destined for military service while remaining saleable as a parlour game, it used a board of 1,617 squares colour-coded by terrain, with pieces representing infantry, cavalry and artillery, and was won by occupying an enemy fortress rather than by checkmate. He revised it for two decades before publishing Das Kriegsspiel (Brunswick, 1803), which abandoned the chess apparatus. His game is distinguished from the later Prussian Kriegsspiel of Georg von Reisswitz and his son, which replaced the grid with free movement over modelled terrain and added an umpire, dice and fog of war.

Hellwig was also an entomologist. He edited the second edition of Pietro Rossi's Fauna Etrusca (1794–95), in which he erected the still-valid beetle genus Ptomaphagus, and his insect cabinet, merged with those of his son-in-law Johann Karl Wilhelm Illiger and of Johann Centurius von Hoffmannsegg, formed the founding core of the insect collection of the University of Berlin.

Others include Amalie von Helvig (1776–1831), poet and translator of the Weimar circle, who made the first German translation of Esaias Tegnér's Frithiofs saga, and Jane Helwig (1947–2021), an American programmer and co-founder of the SAS Institute.

== Noble families ==
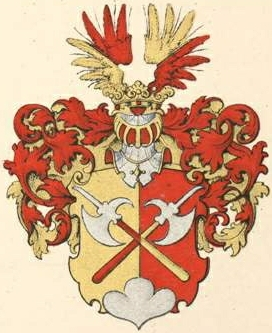
Arms of the Estonian noble family von Helwig

Families of the name were ennobled in Silesia, Brandenburg, Prussia, Croatia-Slavonia and Sweden between the 16th and 19th centuries. Coats of arms are borne by families rather than by names, and onomastic reference works caution that a shared surname is not evidence of a shared family.

=== Helwig or Helwich in Silesia ===
An old noble family seated in the district of Neisse, extinct in the late 16th or early 17th century. Its arms were per pale or and gules, two halberds in saltire over a silver trimount, the hafts counterchanged.

=== von Helwig in Brandenburg and Estonia ===
Descended from Jakob Helwig, councillor at Bernau bei Berlin, and continued in Estonia through the Reval bishop Jakob Helwig the Younger. The brothers Jakob Reinhold, Karl Heinrich, Gustav Wilhelm, Johann Heinrich and Johann Christoph Helwig, all in Russian service, received imperial nobility at Frankfurt on 7 October 1745 from Emperor Francis I; a further diploma had been issued at Frankfurt on 3 October 1744 by Emperor Charles VII. The family was matriculated into the Estonian knighthood on 25 February 1753 under number 212, in the person of Karl Friedrich von Helwig, and held the estate of Voose from 1737 to 1829. Its arms were per pale or and gules, two halberds in saltire with hafts counterchanged, in base a silver trimount; the crest a pair of wings per bend gules and or issuing from a crown.

=== Hellwig in Prussia ===
Friedrich Hellwig, captain in the infantry regiment von Pfuel, was raised to the Prussian nobility on 2 October 1786; his arms were argent, a green wreath through which three lances are thrust.

The partisan commander Friedrich von Hellwig (1775–1845), a son of Johann Christian Ludwig Hellwig, was ennobled by Frederick William III on 12 July 1826 as colonel and commander of the 9th Hussar Regiment, and retired in 1838 as lieutenant general. The sources vary on his forenames, Siebmacher giving Carl Friedrich Ludwig and the Allgemeine Deutsche Biographie Rudolf Friedrich. His arms were per fess by a narrow red bar, above on white the black Prussian eagle, below chequy of black and white in four rows, with a crowned crest of a demi-knight in armour holding in each hand a gold standard bearing the Prussian eagle within a green laurel wreath.

=== Hellwig in Croatia-Slavonia ===
Johann Georg Hellwig, an accounts councillor who had distinguished himself in keeping the land registers of the imperial-royal domains in Croatia, received a hereditary patent of nobility and arms from Emperor Francis II at Vienna on 20 March 1793. His arms were azure, a gold pile with incurved sides charged with a black eagle and flanked by six gold six-pointed stars; the original patent is in the Croatian State Archives.

=== Helvig in Sweden ===
Carl Gottfried Helvig (1764–1844), Swedish master-general of the ordnance and later a Prussian lieutenant general, was ennobled in Sweden on 6 February 1807 and introduced at the Riddarhuset on 4 February 1809; his grandson Hugo was matriculated in Bavaria as von Helvig in 1876.

=== Burgher arms ===
Not all armigerous families of the name were noble. Siebmacher records a pelican in her piety as the arms of Friedrich Hellwig, royal privy legation councillor in Berlin, and the same charge for Jakob Hellwig, councillor at Bernau bei Berlin, whose descendants included a provost at Cölln an der Spree and a chamber-court advocate and city judge in Berlin.

== Distribution ==
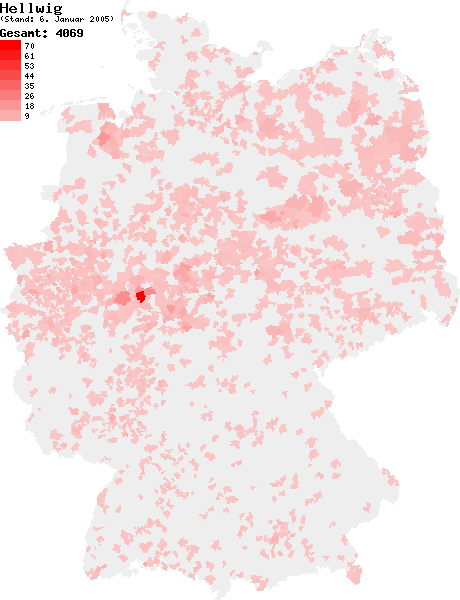
Distribution of the surname Hellwig in Germany

=== Germany and Poland ===
In Germany the DFD records 4,315 bearers of Hellwig, ranking it 621st, and 921 bearers of Helwig, ranking it 3,664th; the double-l form is thus roughly four to five times the more common. In Poland the two forms are recorded with 236 and 252 bearers respectively.

=== The Netherlands ===
The Dutch surname database records 151 bearers of Helwig at the 1947 census, rising to 214 in the 2007 population register, and 64 bearers of Hellwig in 1947 rising to 87. In 1947 the name was markedly concentrated in South Holland, which accounted for 101 of the 151 bearers, with 64 in The Hague alone; the remainder were chiefly in Rotterdam and Limburg. Hellwig, by contrast, was concentrated in Limburg. The similar northern name Helweg, with 152 bearers in 1947, is centred on Groningen and Amsterdam and is treated separately.

=== North America ===
The name reached British North America with 18th-century German emigration through Rotterdam. Strassburger and Hinke's edition of the Philadelphia arrival lists records Friederich Helwig, aged 22, on the Friendship on 12 October 1741, Carlen Helwig on the Elliot on 24 August 1749, Adam Helwig on the St Andrew on 9 September 1749, and Johann Jacob Helwig on the Royal Union on 15 August 1750.

At the 2010 United States census Hellwig was borne by 20,926 people, ranking 1,259th, and Helwig by 11,086, ranking 2,863rd. The Dictionary of American Family Names classifies the American surname as of German and Dutch origin.

== People ==
=== Helwig ===
- Andreas Helwig (1572–1643), German classical scholar and linguist
- David Helwig (1938–2018), Canadian poet
- Hans Helwig (1881–1952), German SS concentration camp commandant
- Jane Helwig (1947–2021), American programmer, co-founder of the SAS Institute
- John Helwig (1927–1994), American football player
- Maggie Helwig (born 1961), Canadian poet and Anglican priest
- Martin Helwig (1516–1574), German cartographer from Silesia
- Paul Helwig (1893–1963), German philosopher, psychologist and screenwriter

=== Hellwig ===
- Christian Hellwig, German economist
- Christoph von Hellwig (1663–1721), German physician and writer
- Fritz Hellwig (1912–2017), German politician and European Commissioner
- Helen Hellwig (1874–1960), American tennis player
- Jason Hellwig (born 1971), Australian sports administrator
- Johann Christian Ludwig Hellwig (1743–1831), German entomologist and wargame inventor
- Judith Hellwig (1906–1993), Austrian soprano
- Marcus Hellwig (born 1965), German journalist
- Margot Hellwig (born 1941), German folk singer
- Maria Hellwig (1920–2010), German yodeler
- Martin Hellwig (born 1949), German economist
- Monika Hellwig (1929–2005), German-born American theologian
- Otto Hellwig (1898–1962), German SS officer
- Renate Hellwig (born 1940), German politician
- James Brian Hellwig (1959–2014), American professional wrestler

=== Other spellings ===
- Amalia von Helvig (1776–1831), German poet and translator
- Christoph Helvig (1581–1617), German philologist and chronologist
- Wolfgang Helbig (1839–1915), German archaeologist

=== As a given or middle name ===
- Alexander Helwig Wyant (1836–1892), American painter

== See also ==
- Hellwig
- Helbig
- Helvig (disambiguation)
- Heilwig
- Helwig, Missouri, extinct hamlet in Holt County
