= Hellwig =

Hellwig is a German surname. Notable people with the surname include:

- Christian Hellwig, German economic theorist and macroeconomist
- Christoph von Hellwig (1663–1721), German physician and writer
- Fritz Hellwig (1912–2017), German politician and European Commissioner
- Helen Hellwig (1874–1960), American tennis player
- James Brian Hellwig (Warrior) (1959–2014), American wrestler better known as Ultimate Warrior
- Jason Hellwig (born 1971), Australian sport administrator
- Johann Christian Ludwig Hellwig (1743–1831), German entomologist
- Judith Hellwig (1906–1993), Austrian soprano
- Maria Hellwig (1920–2010), German yodeler, popular performer
- Marcus Hellwig (born 1965), German journalist
- Margot Hellwig (born 1941), German folk singer
- Martin Hellwig (born 1949), German economist
- Monika Hellwig (1929–2005), German-born US-based British academic, author, educator
- Otto Hellwig (1898–1962), German SS officer
- Renate Hellwig (born 1940), German politician

== See also ==
- Helwig
- Helvig (disambiguation)
