= Hilbig =

Hilbig is a variant of Helbig (German: from the medieval personal name Heilwig or Helwig) and a German surname. Notable people with the surname include:

- Ronja Hilbig (born 1990), German singer
- Wolfgang Hilbig (1941–2007), German writer and poet
