= Halbig =

Halbig (German pronunciation: [ˈhalbɪk]) is a German surname.

== Origin ==
The surname Halbig is derived from the medieval personal name Heilwig or Helwig.

== Notable people ==
Notable people with this surname include:

- Carl Halbig, founder of Simon & Halbig, German doll manufacturer
- Fabian Halbig, member of German band Killerpilze
- Johann Halbig, German sculptor
- Johannes Halbig, member of German band Killerpilze
- Jacqueline Halbig, plaintiff in the American King v. Burwell case
- Tony Halbig, German racing driver
