= Heylen =

Heylen is a Dutch patronymic or matronymic surname most common in the province of Antwerp. Heile is an archaic Germanic given name, sometimes a short form of the name Heilwig. Notable people with the surname include:

- Benny Heylen (born 1972), Belgian mountain biker
- Dirk Heylen (born 1967), Belgian curler and coach
- Ilse Heylen (born 1977), Belgian judoka
- Jan Heylen (born 1980), Belgian racing driver
- Michaël Heylen (born 1994), Belgian footballer
- Syd Heylen (1922–1996), Australian actor and comedian
- Thomas Louis Heylen (1856–1941), Belgian Roman Catholic bishop of Namur 1899–1941
