= Heilwig =

Heilwig (German pronunciation: [ˈhaɪlbɪk]) is a German female given name. It is related to the names Helwig and Hillevi and to the surname Halbig.

== Notable people ==
Notable people with this given name include:

- Heilwig Jacob (born 1942), German sprinter
- Heilwig of Lippe (c. 1200–c. 1250), German noblewoman

== See also ==
- Halbig
- Helwig
- Hellwig
- Helvig (disambiguation)
