= Hillevi =

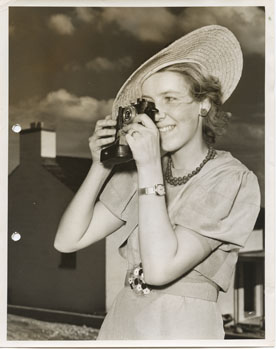
Hillevi Svedberg

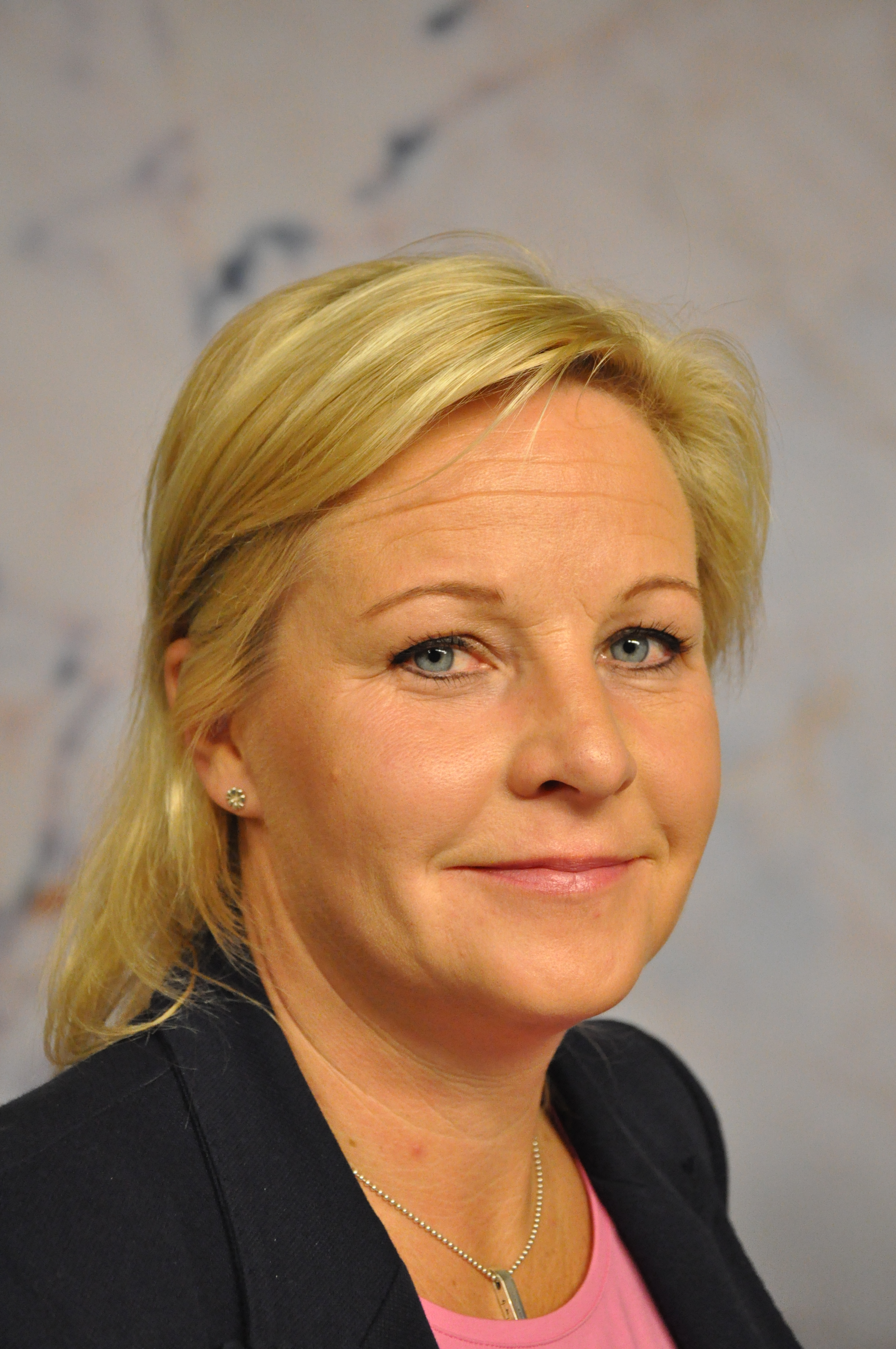
Hillevi Engström

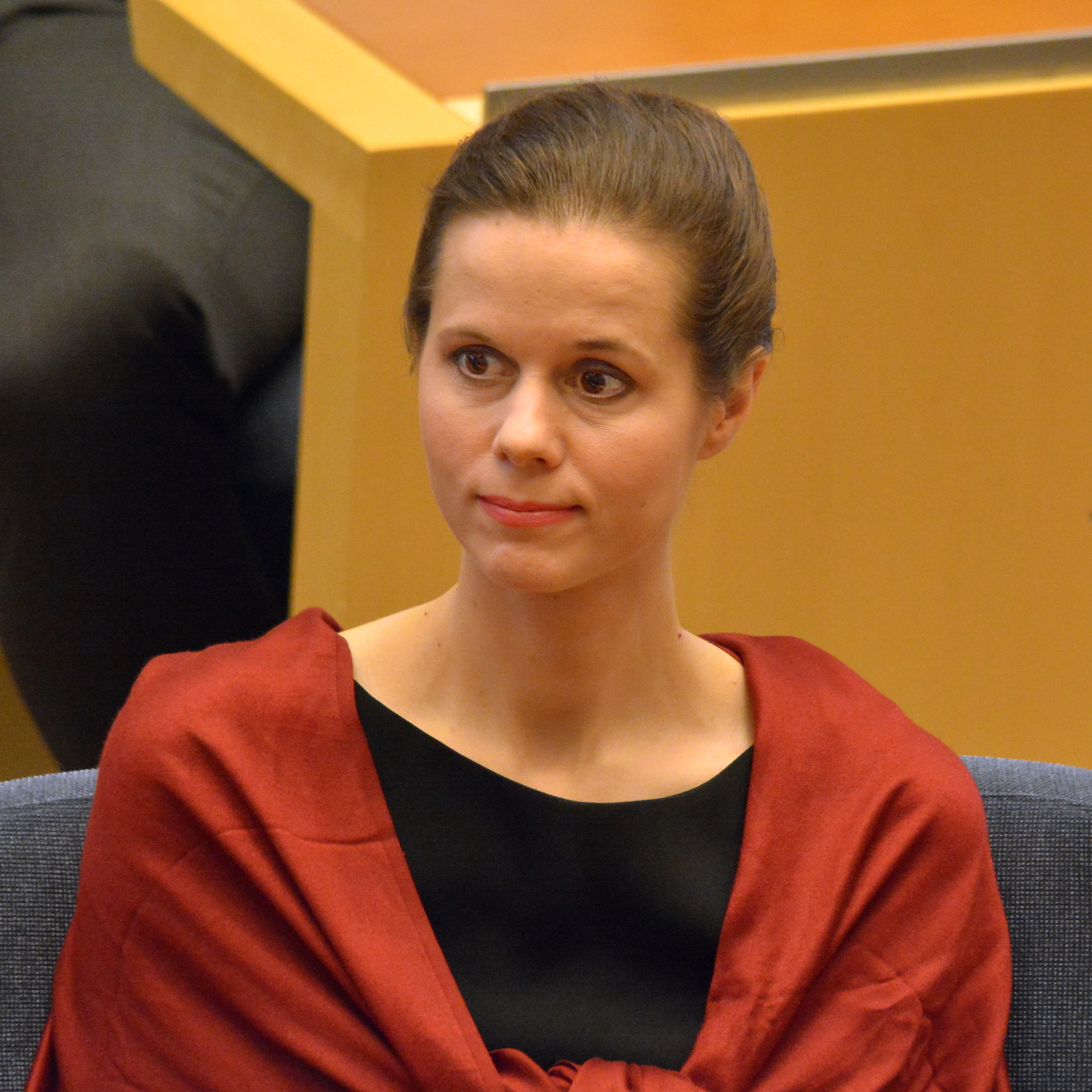
Hillevi Larsson

Hillevi (also Hellevi) is a Scandinavian version of the German name Helvig, originally Heilwig. The oldest record of a Swedish woman by the name Hillevi is from 1482.

== Notable people named Hillevi ==
- Hillevi Engström, Swedish politician and Minister for International Development Cooperation
- Hillevi Lagerstam, Finnish actress
- Hillevi Larsson, Swedish politician
- Hillevi Martinpelto, Swedish opera singer
- Hillevi Rombin, Swedish model and actress
- Hillevi Svedberg, Swedish architect
