= Ptomaphagus nevadicus =

Scientific classification
- Domain: Eukaryota
- Kingdom: Animalia
- Phylum: Arthropoda
- Class: Insecta
- Order: Coleoptera
- Suborder: Polyphaga
- Infraorder: Staphyliniformia
- Family: Leiodidae
- Genus: Ptomaphagus
- Species: P. nevadicus

Binomial name
- Ptomaphagus nevadicus Horn, 1880

Species of beetle

Ptomaphagus nevadicus is a species of small carrion beetle in the family Leiodidae. It is found in Central America and North America.
