= Ptomaphagus fumosus =

Scientific classification
- Domain: Eukaryota
- Kingdom: Animalia
- Phylum: Arthropoda
- Class: Insecta
- Order: Coleoptera
- Suborder: Polyphaga
- Infraorder: Staphyliniformia
- Family: Leiodidae
- Genus: Ptomaphagus
- Species: P. fumosus

Binomial name
- Ptomaphagus fumosus (Peck, 1979)

Synonyms
- Adelopsis fumosa Peck, 1979

Species of beetle

Ptomaphagus fumosus is a species of small carrion beetle in the family Leiodidae. It is found in North America.
