= Ptomaphagus cavernicola =

Scientific classification
- Domain: Eukaryota
- Kingdom: Animalia
- Phylum: Arthropoda
- Class: Insecta
- Order: Coleoptera
- Suborder: Polyphaga
- Infraorder: Staphyliniformia
- Family: Leiodidae
- Genus: Ptomaphagus
- Species: P. cavernicola

Binomial name
- Ptomaphagus cavernicola Schwarz, 1898

Species of beetle

Ptomaphagus cavernicola is a species of small carrion beetle in the family Leiodidae. It is found in Central America and North America.

== Subspecies ==
These two subspecies belong to the species Ptomaphagus cavernicola:

- Ptomaphagus cavernicola aditus Peck, 1973
- Ptomaphagus cavernicola cavernicola Schwarz, 1898
