= Helvig =

Helvig may refer to:

- Helvig of Holstein (c. 1260 – c. 1324), Queen consort of Magnus Ladulås of Sweden
- Hedvig of Holstein (German: Heilwig; 1398–1436), duchess of Schleswig, mother of King Christian I of Denmark
- Helvig of Schleswig (died 1374), Danish queen consort

== People with the surname ==
- Amalia von Helvig (1776–1831), German-Swedish artist and writer
- Christoph Helvig (1581–1617), German chronologist and historian

== See also ==
- Helwig
- Hellwig
