= Reit im Winkl =

- Municipality
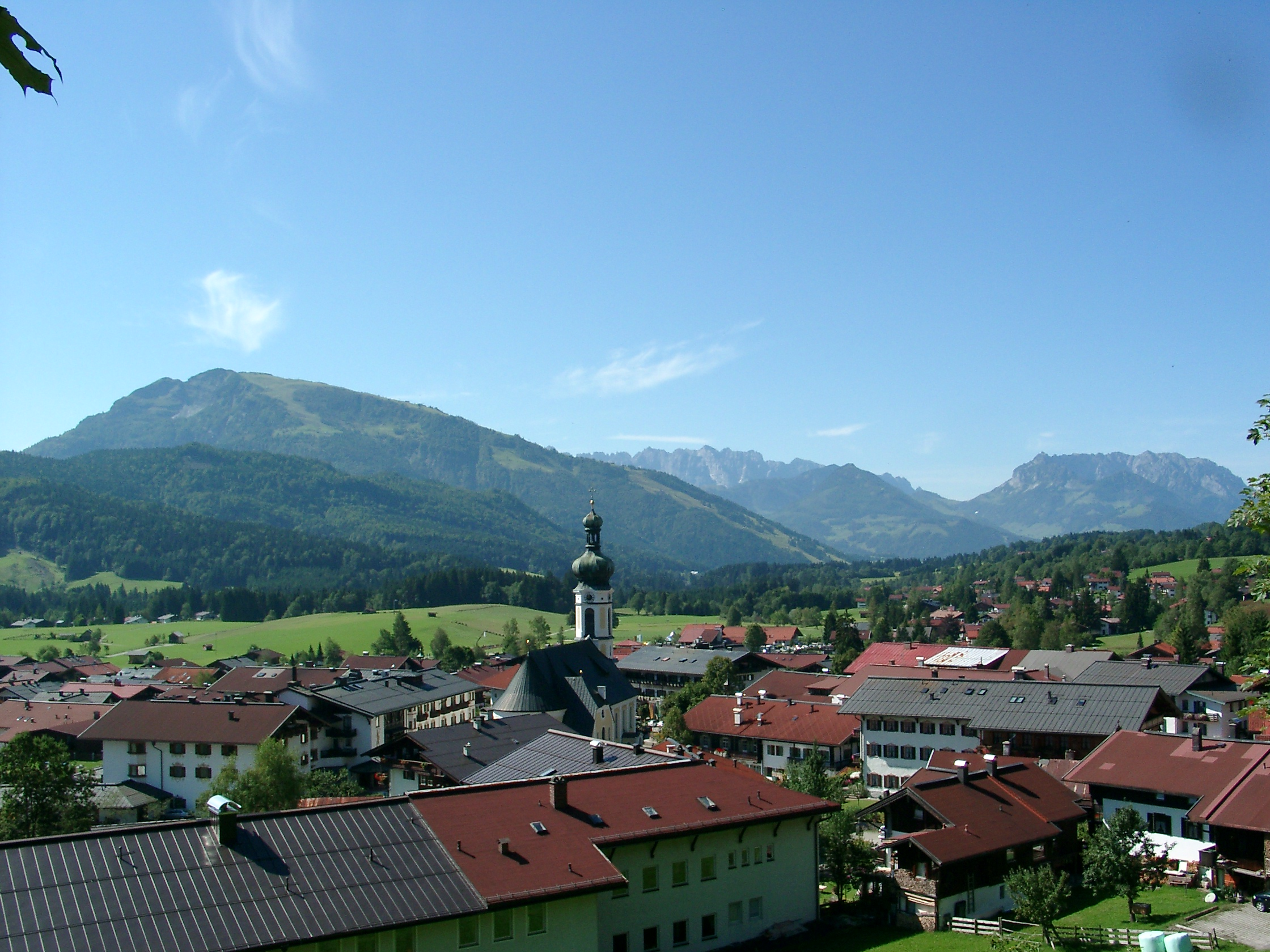
- Reit im Winkl with Unterberg Wilder- and Zahmerkaiser

- Coat of arms

- Location of Reit im Winkl within Traunstein district
- Interactive map of Reit im Winkl
- Location within Germany Location within Bavaria
- Coordinates: 47°41′N 12°28′E
- Country: Germany
- State: Bavaria
- Admin. region: Oberbayern
- District: Traunstein
- Subdivisions: 10 Ortsteile

Government
  - Mayor (2020–26): Matthias Schlechter (CSU)

Area
  - Total: 70.98 km^{2} (27.41 sq mi)
- Elevation: 696–1,869 m (2,283–6,132 ft)

Population (2025-12-31)
  - Total: 6,739
  - Density: 94.94/km^{2} (245.9/sq mi)
- Time zone: UTC+01:00 (CET)
  - Summer (DST): UTC+02:00 (CEST)
- Postal codes: 83242
- Dialling codes: 08640
- Vehicle registration: TS
- Website: www.reitimwinkl.de

Reit im Winkl (German pronunciation: [ˈʁaɪt ʔɪm ˈvɪŋkl̩]) is a small village located on the German/Austrian border in the southeastern part of Bavaria, Germany. Part of the Traunstein district, it was previously an immigration and customs control point (prior to the formation of the Schengen Zone). It is situated south of Chiemsee and southwest of Ruhpolding – home of the Biathlon World Cup – in the Bavarian Alps and facing towards Tyrol. The village lies next to the Austrian states Tyrol and Salzburg. Kössen in Tyrol is the next village on the river Lofer, before it joins the confluence of the river Tiroler Achen. Reit im Winkl has a population of approximately 2,600.

Reit im Winkl is well known as both a certified place of restorative and curative air (Luftkurort) and a ski resort, offering alpine skiing, cross-country skiing, both classical and skating, and snow-boarding, as well as mountain trekking and hiking. It achieved, in 2012, Germany's first-ever Premium Winter Trails Certification. In 2012 Reit im Winkl had the deepest snow of 120 cm for a plateau area, which occurred in February, long after snow had melted elsewhere in the region. Reit im Winkl has two alpine skiing areas: 1) Three lifts in the suburb of Blindau (Benzeck) as well as a snow-tubing lift, and the large plateau skiing area at Winklmoos Alm which connects with Steinplatte in Austria and is reached by the gondola cableway (bubble lift) from Seegatterl.

In summer, Reit im Winkl enjoys one of the highest counts of sunny days in Bavaria, and is popular with mountain bike and Nordic walking enthusiasts. Visitors can enjoy swimming in either of the three alpine lakes (Weitsee, Mittersee and Loedensee) northeast of Seegatterl, or try their luck at fishing in the trout lake.

Reit im Winkl is popularly known to locals and return visitors as Germany's own Tyrol, and boasts its own home-grown regional specialities such as Heumilch cheese (cheese made from cows fed exclusively hay pasture), heuschnapps (a liqueur in which mountain hay and herbs are soaked to produce a distinctive and sweet taste of hay) and Reiberdatschi (grated potatoes mixed with a little egg and flour and poured as a flat mass into a skillet and fried), popularly eaten with apple mousse.

== Suburbs ==
Reit im Winkl is divided into the suburbs Birnbach, Blindau, Entfelden, Groissenbach, Oberbichl, Seegatterl, Unterbichl and Winklmoos Alm.

== History ==
The first signs of settlement in Reit im Winkl are in the 12th century. The date of the foundation is 1160 when Otto de Rute was named in a document. The accuracy of the document is disputed and some historians put the beginning of the settlement to the middle of the 13th century. Since then it has been part of Bavaria.

Reit im Winkl was part of the parish of Kirchdorf in Tirol which was itself part of the diocese of Chiemsee from 1275 until 1804.

Historians have assumed the location of the manor of the Herren von Reit (Lords of Reit), on a small hill above the church.

== Coat of arms ==
The coat of arms was created 1929 replacing the old coat of arms which showed a blue chapel on a green hill. The new coat of arms shows the eagle on yellow ground of the diocese of Chiemsee in a corner (Winkl derived from the German word Winkel for corner). The burning log and the sapie (axe like tool to trail logs) on the forest green ground are symbols for the clearing of the forest to create pasture and farm land in 11th and 12th century.

== Economy ==
=== History ===
Formerly, Reit im Winkl was mostly dependent on logging and forestry, because of the brevity of the growing season for agricultural production. Trees were logged in summer and transported to storage places with horses or by hand. Logs were transferred to neighbouring Tyrol for sale: in winter either via sleds with a man sitting in front using his feet to brake and control the sled, which resulted in severe accidents occurring regularly, or via dams which were constructed to hold the meltwater during spring in order to raft the timber down the valley – such a dam can be found on display at Winklmoss Alm. Because the orientation of the valley made it impossible to sell the rafted wood to the salt works of Bad Reichenhall or Traunstein – which had an enormous fuel consumption – logs were sent south. In one such contract the wood was sold to the silver works in the Inn valley in Tyrol and as an exchange Tyrol sold logs to the salt works in Bad Reichenhall.

=== Today ===
The first tourist to Reit im Winkl, in the year 1858, was King Maximilian II, as reported in the local press. The Strength Through Joy movement in the Third Reich and the closed borders after the war boosted tourism as the principal source of income in the region. Today, approximately 5000 beds for annual visitor numbers of 90 000 provides an indication of the importance of tourism for Reit im Winkl.

== Transport ==
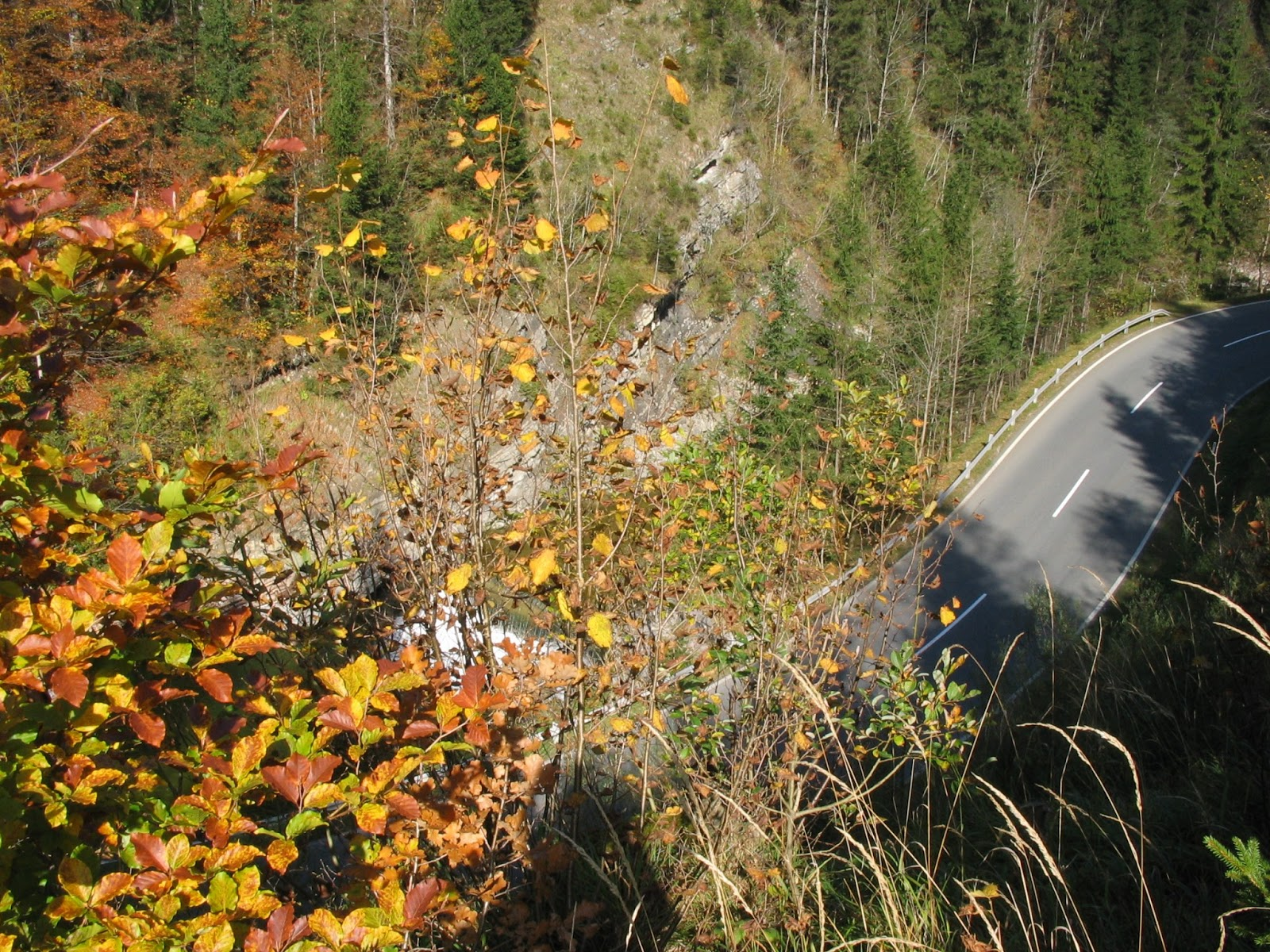
German Alps Road (B 305), near Reit im Winkl, Germany

Reit im Winkl is located along the Deutschen Alpenstraße (B 305) (German Alps Road). Coming from Munich by car it can be reached either from the Munich-Salzburg highway A8 at Bernau or Chiemsee and the Tiroler Achen valley; coming from Salzburg along the Munich-Salzburg A8 at Siegsdorf or Grabenstatt via Ruhpolding, or through Bad Reichenhall via Berchtesgarden. The Maserer pass (B305, direction Marquartstein) has been renovated and widened (most recently at the end of the 20th century) – during periods of heavy snowfall, snow chains are recommended. The B305 continues through the village, across the border into Austria and follows the river Lofer river to Kössen straight into the Inn valley. Because of the need for transport capacities for the sawmills and logs from the surrounding forest a narrow gauge railway was built from Ruhpolding to Reit im Winkl in 1923. Following accidents and as a result of the high maintenance costs (winter conditions) the railway was demolished in the 1930s. The causeway is used as a bicycle trail in summer and for Nordic skiing in the winter.

Apart from private car, Reit im Winkl can be reached via public transport – the RVO (Regionalverkehr Oberbayern) runs the following bus services which also connect (in the case of Prien am Chiemsee, Salzburg and Traunstein) with the Deutsche Bahn (train services).

   1. 9505 – Reit im Winkl – Prien am Chiemsee
   2. 9506 – Reit im Winkl – Inzell
   3. 9507 – Reit im Winkl – Winklmoos
   4. 9509 – Reit im Winkl – Traunstein
   5. 9531 – Oberwössen – Übersee
   6. 9535 – Reit im Winkl – Salzburg

Reit im Winkl also has one taxi service, a rental car service, and a minibus rental/coach with driver service.

== Personalities ==
=== Sons and daughters of the community ===
- Maria Hellwig (1920–2010) and Margot Hellwig (born 1941), interpreters of popular music
- Rosi Mittermaier (1950–2023), popular ski racer
- Thomas Klauser (born 1964), ski jumper

=== Other personalities linked to Reit im Winkl ===
- Dettmar Cramer (1925–2015), former German footballer and coach
- Takeo Ischi (born 1947), Japanese singer and yodeller
- Evi Mittermaier (born 1953), ski racer
- Evi Sachenbacher-Stehle (born 1980), cross-country skier and biathlete, active until 2014
