= Andrea Andreen =

Swedish physician, pacifist and feminist

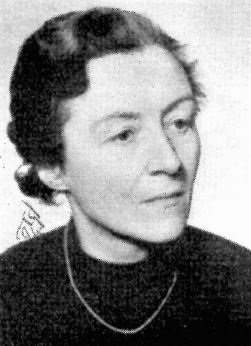
Andrea Andreen

Ellenor Andrea Andreen (1888–1972) was a Swedish physician, pacifist and feminist. As a physician, she specialized in the treatment of diabetes, combining dietary restrictions with insulin. A prominent figure in the Swedish women's movement, she became a council member of the Women's International Democratic Federation in 1945, later becoming a vice-president. She chaired the Svenska Kvinnors Vänsterförbund (Swedish Women's Left-wing Association) from 1946 to 1964. A strong proponent of nuclear disarmament, in 1953 she was awarded the Stalin Peace Prize.

== Early life, family and education ==
Born on 11 July 1888 in Örby, Västra Götaland County, Andrea Andreen was the daughter of the textile factory director Johan Walfrid Andreen and Eleonore Andreen. Although her parents were conservative and Chartauanist, they believed that their daughters should have the same access to education as their sons. Therefore, Andrea Andreen first attended a private school in Fritsla, and was then educated at home by a governess. She attended Gothenburg's girls gymnasium, matriculating from Hvitfeldtska gymnasiet in 1905. In 1909, she married the chemist and Nobel laureate The Svedberg with whom she had two children, among them Hillevi Svedberg, before the couple divorced in 1914. From 1937 to 1942 she was married to the politician Nils Wohlin.

== Medical career ==
She embarked on preliminary medical studies at Uppsala University in 1909 but then interrupted her studies until 1917, graduating in medicine from the Karolinska Institute in Stockholm in 1919. During the academic year 1908-1909, she was also active on the board of the Uppsala Christian Student Association. Andreen was active in the Uppsala student association and during the academic year 1913-1914, she held the position of vice president of the association. She was also the director of the Office for Information and Career Counseling of Uppsala Student Associations She received her medical doctorate in 1933. After working as a hospital physician, she established a clinical laboratory for diabetes testing and analyzes at the Sankt Göran Hospital in 1923. The laboratory was transferred to the Stockholm City Health Authority a few years later and was turned into a general clinic, with Andre Andreen as director. In 1945, the name of the laboratory was changed to Stockholms sjukhusdirektions kliniska centrallaboratorium (Stockholm hospital governing board’s clinical central laboratory).

She also had a private practice, dealing mainly with patients with diabetes.

Following the introduction of insulin in 1921, Andreen spent six years at Harvard Medical School in Boston where she worked with Otto Folin in his laboratory. Together with Elliott P. Joslin she learnt how to combine insulin treatment with a well-balanced diet. On returning to Sweden, she practised this approach with her diabetes patients.

== Peace and women's rights ==
In addition to her studies and work, Andrea Andreen was also socially active. Together with Ada Nilsson, Alma Sundquist and Gerda Kjellberg and others continued Karolina Widerström's work on sex education and hygiene. Andreen taught physiology at the Högre lärarinneseminariet in Stockholm from 1921 to 1941, health education at the Brummer school and Statens normalskola för flickor from 1922 to 1929; and genetics and sexual hygiene at the Institute for Social Political and Communal Education and Research. From 1938 to 1941, she served as president of the Stockholm City Authority for the Assistance of Maternity. In 1935, together with Ada Nilsson, she published Undervisning i sexualhygien.

Andreen was elected to the board of the women's association Nya Idun in 1919 and later served as its vice-president and president. In the 1930s, Andreen was a member of Frisinnade Kvinnor (Liberated Women) where she contributed to the association's magazine Tidevarvet and promoted sexual hygiene. The organization later became known as Svenska Kvinnors Vänsterförbund (Swedish Women's Left-wing Association). It fought for equal representation of women and men in local and national elections. Andreen chaired the organization from 1946 to 1964. She was one of the Swedish pioneers who promoted the introduction of sports for women, demonstrating that physical exercise was no more harmful to women than to men.

In 1945, she became a council member of the Women's International Democratic Federation on its establishment in Paris. She was a radical pacifist, opposing nuclear armaments for Sweden. In the 1950s, she participated in an international committee investigating the American use of biological warfare in China and Korea. In 1953, she was awarded the Lenin Peace Prize.

From 1967 to 1971, she edited the magazine Vi Kvinnor (We Women). An active member of the Swedish-Korean Association, she was elected Honorary Chair in 1970.

Andrea Andreen died of cancer on 20 April 1972.

== Bibliography ==
- Undervisning i sexualhygien, mit Ada Nilsson, Stockholm, 1935
- Bakteriekrig i Korea och Kina: rapport från den internationella ventenskapliga kommissionen för undersökning av fakta rörande bakterikrig i Korea och Kina, Stockholm, 1952
- Svenska kvinnors vänsterförbund: en femtioårsberättelse., Stockholm, 1954
- Total avrustning, en nödvändighet i atomåldern, Stockholm, 1960

== See also ==
- List of peace activists
