= Nodaway Township, Holt County, Missouri =

Township in Holt County, Missouri, U.S.

Nodaway Township
- Township
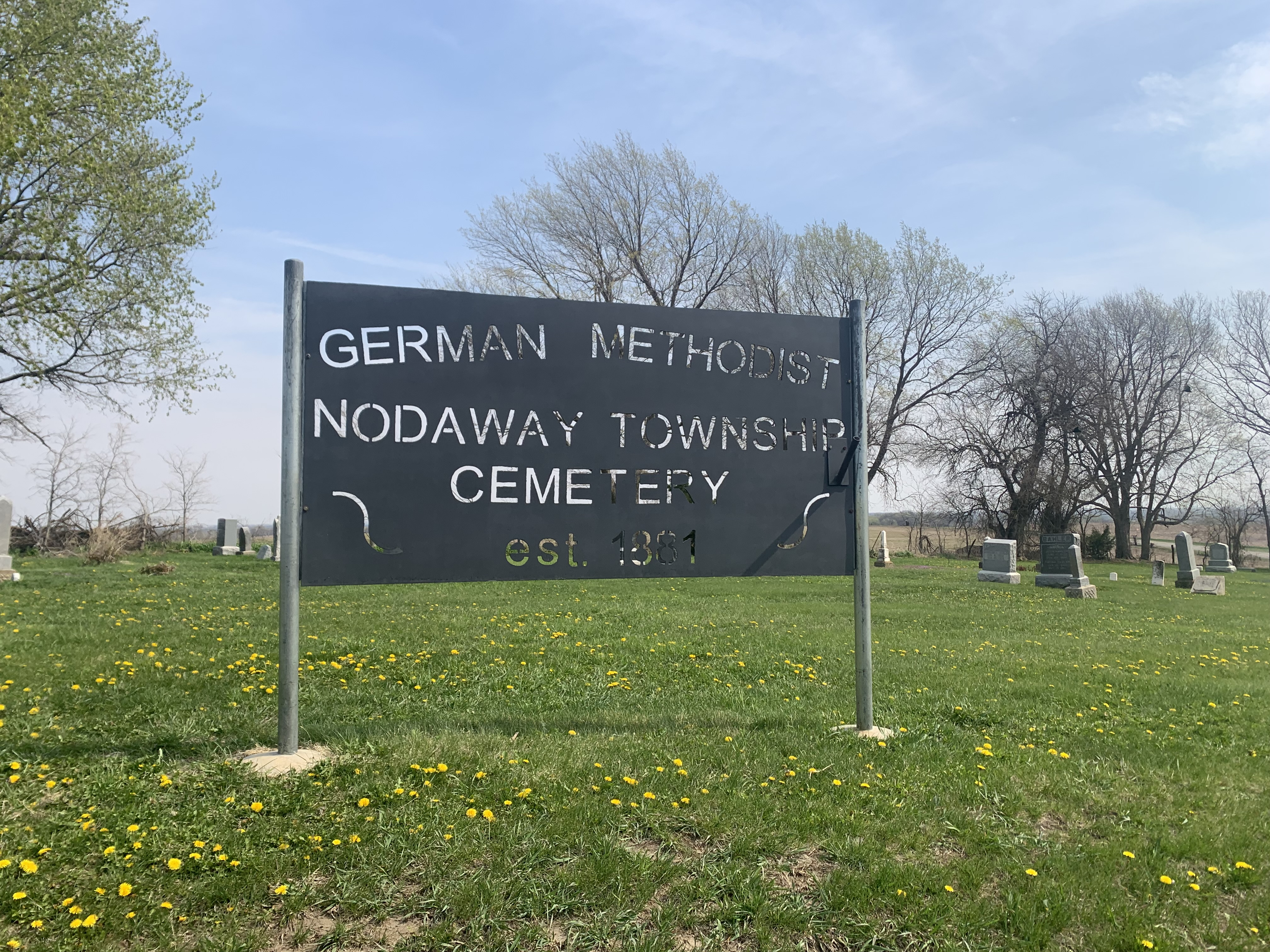
- German Methodist Cemetery in Nodaway Township

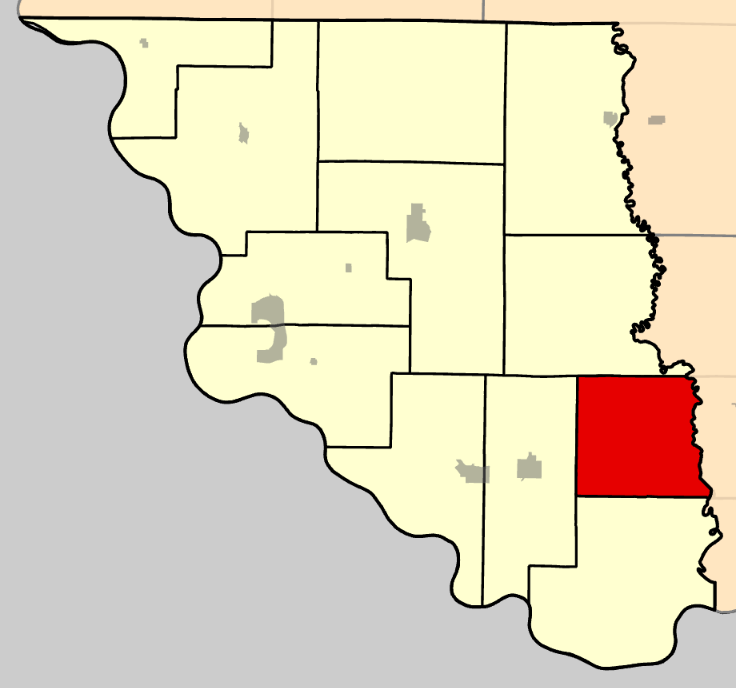
- Coordinates: 40°00′21″N 95°03′29″W
- Country: United States
- State: Missouri
- County: Holt

Area
  - Total: 26.89 sq mi (69.6 km^{2})
  - Land: 26.87 sq mi (69.6 km^{2})
  - Water: 0.02 sq mi (0.052 km^{2}) 0.07%
- Elevation: 1,063 ft (324 m)

Population (2020)
  - Total: 156
  - Density: 5.8/sq mi (2.2/km^{2})
- FIPS code: 29-08752706
- GNIS feature ID: 766771

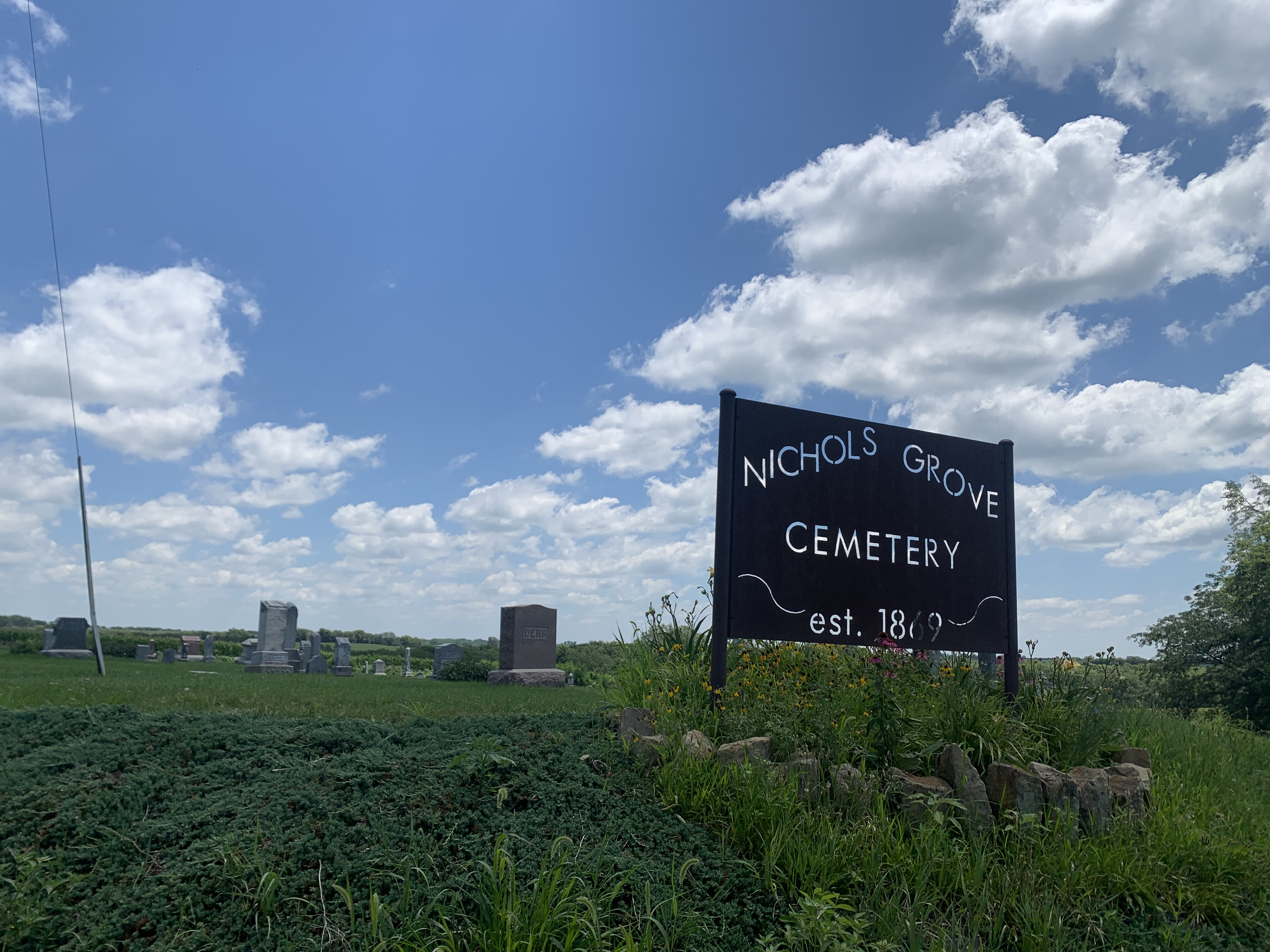
Nichols Grove Cemetery in northern Nodaway Township

Nodaway Township is a township in Holt County, Missouri, United States. At the 2020 census, its population was 156. Its name comes from the Nodaway River. It is approximately 25 square miles. No communities are presently located within the township, though Richville once existed centrally in the township.

Nodaway Township was erected in 1841 and was one of the two original divisions of Holt County. The township was reduced in size to its present limits by the organization of Hickory Township on June 17, 1874. In the early 1840s, the first ferry in Holt County was established, called Toole ferry and later Rapids ferry. The first bridge over the Nodaway River was built in Hickory Township in the mid-19th century.

== Transportation ==
The following highways travel through the township:

- Interstate 29
- U.S. Route 59
- Route B
- Route H
- Route O
- Route Y
