= Ptomaphagus californicus =

Scientific classification
- Kingdom: Animalia
- Phylum: Arthropoda
- Class: Insecta
- Order: Coleoptera
- Suborder: Polyphaga
- Infraorder: Staphyliniformia
- Family: Leiodidae
- Genus: Ptomaphagus
- Species: P. californicus

Binomial name
- Ptomaphagus californicus (LeConte, 1854)

Species of beetle

Ptomaphagus californicus is a species of small carrion beetle in the family Leiodidae. It is found in North America.
