= Ptomaphagus =

Scientific classification
- Kingdom: Animalia
- Phylum: Arthropoda
- Class: Insecta
- Order: Coleoptera
- Suborder: Polyphaga
- Infraorder: Staphyliniformia
- Family: Leiodidae
- Subfamily: Cholevinae
- Tribe: Ptomaphagini
- Genus: Ptomaphagus; Hellwig, 1795

Synonyms
- Adelops Tellkampf, 1843

Genus of beetles

Ptomaphagus is a genus of small carrion beetles in the family Leiodidae. There are at least 50 described species in Ptomaphagus.

ITIS Taxonomic note:

- Although Ptomaphagus is sometimes attributed to Illiger 1798, Bouchard et al. (2011:173) attribute it to Hellwig 1795.

== Species ==
- Ptomaphagus acutus Peck and Gnaspini, 1997
- Ptomaphagus alleghenyensis (Peck, 1979)
- Ptomaphagus appalachianus (Peck, 1979)
- Ptomaphagus barri Peck, 1973
- Ptomaphagus bedfordensis (Peck, 1979)
- Ptomaphagus brevior Jeannel, 1949
- Ptomaphagus californicus (LeConte, 1854)
- Ptomaphagus cavernicola Schwarz, 1898
- Ptomaphagus chihuahuensis (Peck, 1976)
- Ptomaphagus chromolithus Peck, 1984
- Ptomaphagus cocytus Peck, 1973
- Ptomaphagus consobrinus (LeConte, 1853)
- Ptomaphagus cumberlandus (Peck, 1979)
- Ptomaphagus densus Hatch, 1957
- Ptomaphagus episcopus Peck, 1973
- Ptomaphagus fecundus (Barr, 1963)
- Ptomaphagus fiskei Peck, 1973
- Ptomaphagus fisus Horn, 1885
- Ptomaphagus fumosus (Peck, 1979)
- Ptomaphagus geomysi Peck and Skelley, 2002
- Ptomaphagus hatchi Jeannel, 1933
- Ptomaphagus hazelae Peck, 1973
- Ptomaphagus hirtus (Tellkampf, 1844)
- Ptomaphagus hubrichti Barr, 1958
- Ptomaphagus inyoensis Peck and Gnaspini, 1997
- Ptomaphagus joanna (Peck, 1979)
- Ptomaphagus jonesi (Peck, 1979)
- Ptomaphagus julius Peck, 1973
- Ptomaphagus laticornis Jeannel, 1949
- Ptomaphagus lincolnensis Peck, 1978
- Ptomaphagus loedingi Hatch, 1933
- Ptomaphagus longicornis Jeannel, 1949
- Ptomaphagus manzano Peck, 1978
- Ptomaphagus merritti Tishechkin, 2007
- Ptomaphagus mitchellensis (Hatch, 1933)
- Ptomaphagus nashvillensis (Peck, 1979)
- Ptomaphagus nevadicus Horn, 1880
- Ptomaphagus orichalcum (Peck, 1979)
- Ptomaphagus parashant Peck and Wynne, 2013
- Ptomaphagus pecki Gnaspini, 1996
- Ptomaphagus piperi Hatch, 1933
- Ptomaphagus pisgahensis (Peck, 1979)
- Ptomaphagus richlandensis (Peck, 1979)
- Ptomaphagus schwarzi Hatch, 1933
- Ptomaphagus scottsboroensis (Peck, 1979)
- Ptomaphagus setiger (Horn, 1885)
- Ptomaphagus shapardi Sanderson, 1939
- Ptomaphagus sibiricus Jeannel, 1934
- Ptomaphagus solanum Peck, 1973
- Ptomaphagus sonorensis (Peck, 1976)
- Ptomaphagus steevesi (Peck, 1979)
- Ptomaphagus subvillosus (Goeze, 1777)
- Ptomaphagus suteri (Peck, 1979)
- Ptomaphagus texanus Melander, 1902
- Ptomaphagus thomomysi Hatch, 1957
- Ptomaphagus thebeatles
- Ptomaphagus torodei Peck, 1984
- Ptomaphagus ulkei Horn, 1885
- Ptomaphagus valentinei Jeannel, 1933
- Ptomaphagus walteri Peck, 1973
- Ptomaphagus whiteselli Barr, 1963
