= Killerpilze =

German pop rock band

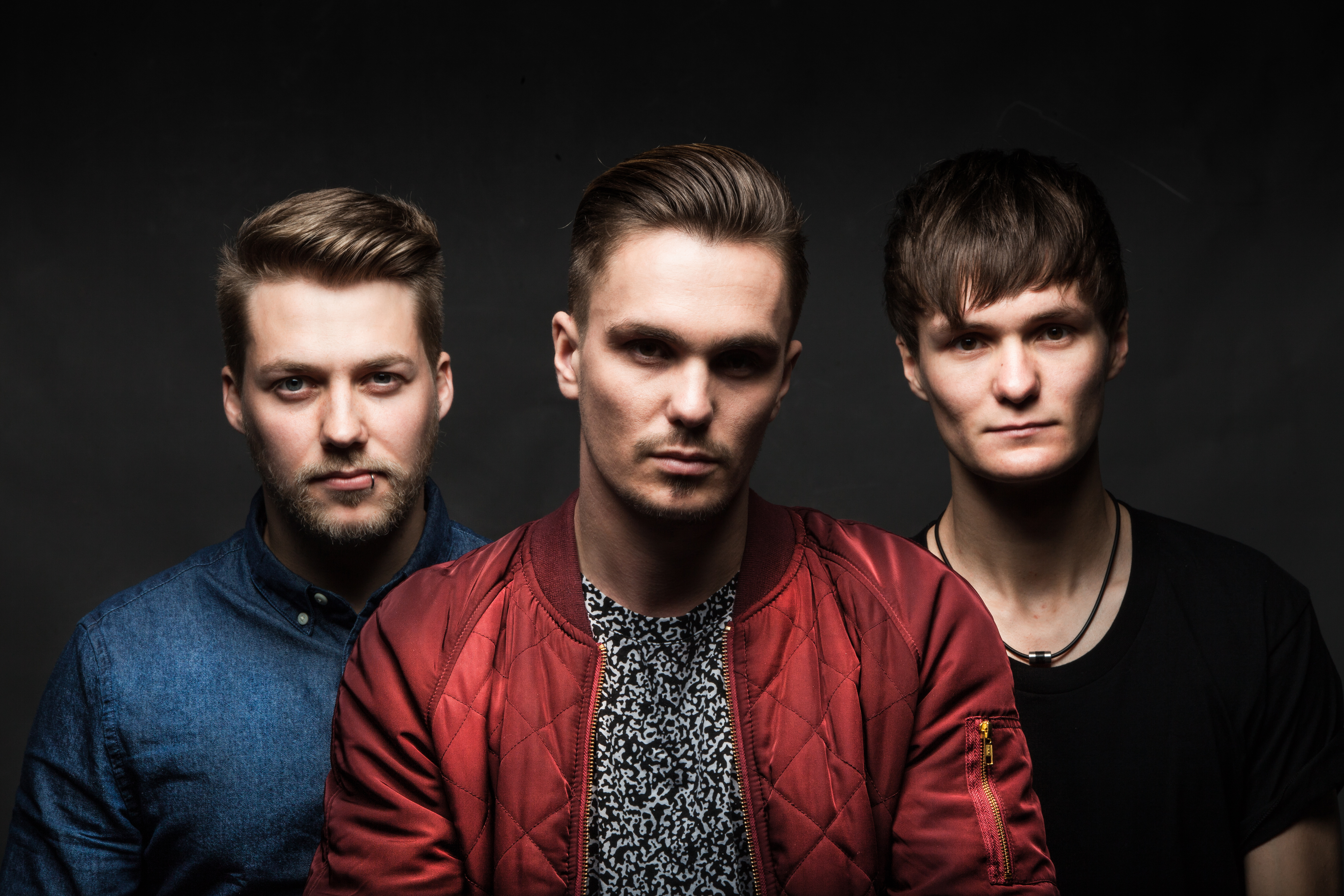
- Killerpilze (2014)

Background information
- Origin: Dillingen, Germany
- Genres: Pop rock, pop punk
- Years active: 2002–present
- Labels: Universal Music (2005 - 2009) killerpilzerecords (2010)
- Members: Johannes Halbig (31); Fabian Halbig (28); Maximilian Schlichter (32)
- Past members: Andreas Schlagenhaft
- Website: www.killerpilze.de

The band Killerpilze (German for "Killer Mushrooms") is a German pop rock/pop punk band from Dillingen an der Donau, Germany.

== History ==
Killerpilze formed in October 2002 in Dillingen an der Donau. The inspiration for their name would come from a night of eating pizza. In their early years, Killerpilze sang in both English and German, and toured their local area. The three band members attended school while working on recording their music.

On July 7, 2004, the group recorded its first album, Von vorne durch die Punkalle. They performed in small concert halls until Universal Music signed them for a record deal. In 2005, they recorded their first official album, Invasion der Killerpilze. In spring 2006, their debut single "Richtig Scheiße" ("Really Shitty") reached #14 in Germany.

On July 27, 2007, the band released its second album, Mit Pauken und Raketen. Their album debuted at #14 on German charts.

In July 2008, their song "Verrockt" was used in the German soundtrack of Camp Rock.

In 2010, the band created its own label, KillerpilzeRecords. On February 12 of the same year, the first single, "Drei", from their third album, Lautonom, was released. In the end of 2010, the group returned to the studio and recorded their fourth album, Ein Bisschen Zeitgeist.

The band has contributed to campaigns such as Kein Bock auf Nazis ("No Support for Nazis") and Punk Macht Schule ("Punk Goes School"), which helps to build schools in Ethiopia.

== Members ==
- Johannes "Jo" Halbig plays rhythm guitar, piano and sings.
- Fabian "Fabi" Halbig is the drummer.
- Maximilian "Mäx" Schlichter has played lead guitar and sings.
- Andreas "Schlagi" Schlagenhaft was the former bassist of the band.

=== Johannes Halbig ===
Johannes Halbig, (better known as Jo) was born on the July 30, 1989. He had just completed his last year at the German high school 'St. Bonaventura Gymnasium' in Dillingen an der Donau, where he lives with his family. Jo plays a range of instruments, including piano, guitar, and bass guitar.

=== Fabian Halbig ===
Fabian Halbig (also known as Fabi) was born on December 23, 1992. He is the youngest member of the band, and also plays trumpet. He has done so since the age of eight.

Filmography

Film
Year	Film	Role	Notes
2009	The Crocodiles	Kai	
2010	The Crocodiles Strike Back	Kai	
2011	The Crocodiles: All for One	Kai	
2012	Milk Money	Wolfgang Ayerle	TV movie
2013	Der blinde Fleck	Gundolf Köhler	
2013	Zurich	Fahrer	
2018	Mein rechter, rechter Platz ist frei	Mark	
2019	Gasmann	Zeitungsverkäufer	

Television
Year	Title	Role	Notes
2013	Tatort	David Kleinert	Episode: Macht und Ohnmacht
2016	Der Alte	Sven Kaminski	Episode: Die Angst danach
2019	SOKO München	Florian Bergmann	Episode: Stille Liebe

=== Maximilian Schlichter ===
Maximilian Schlichter, (known as Mäx) was born on July 3, 1988. Mäx is the oldest in the band, and has played lead guitar and sings.

== Discography ==
=== Album ===
- 2004: Von Vorne durch die Punkallee ("Straight Through Punk Avenue")
- 2006: Invasion der Killerpilze ("Invasion of Killerpilze") (#2 Austria, #7 Germany, #47 Switzerland, #62 France)
- 2007: Mit Pauken und Raketen (With drums and rockets) (#14 Germany, #15 Austria, #55 France, #58 Switzerland)
- 2010: Lautonom
- 2011: Ein bisschen Zeitgeist
- 2013: Grell
- 2014: Postkarten
- 2016: HIGH

=== Singles ===
- 2006: "'Richtig scheisse (auf 'ne schöne Art und Weise)" ("Really Shitty (In a Good Way)") – #10 Austria, #17 Germany, #62 Switzerland
- 2006: "Springt hoch" ("Jump High") – #27 Austria, #35 Germany, #40 Switzerland
- 2006: "Ich kann auch ohne dich" ("I Can Go On Without You Too") – #13 Austria, #30 Germany, #34 Swiss
- 2007: "Liebmichhassmich" ("Lovemehateme") – #19 Germany, #32 Austria, #83 Swiss
- 2007: "Ich Brauche Nichts" ("I don't need anything")
- 2007: "Letzte Minute" ("Last Minute") – TBA
- 2008: "Stress Im Nightliner" ("Stress in the Sleeper Bus") – TBA
- 2008: "Verrockt" ("We Rock") – #84 Germany
- 2010: "Drei" ("Three") – #72 Germany
- 2010: "Am Meer" ("At the sea") – #TBS Germany
- 2010: "Plastik" ("Plastic")
- 2011: "KOMM KOMM.COM" ("come come.com")
- 2011: "Jubel und Staub" ("rejoicing and dust")
- 2013: "Nimm mich mit" ("Take me with You")
- 2013: "Sommerregen" ("Summer Rain")
- 2013: "Die Stadt klingt immer noch nach uns" ("The Town still sounds like us")
- 2015: "H.E.A.R.T."
- 2016: "RUINEN" ("Ruins")

=== Soundtrack ===
- 2008: Camp Rock (soundtrack) – Verrockt ("We Rock")
- 2009: Vorstadtkrokodile – Der Moment ("The Moment")
- 2010: Vorstadtkrokodile 2 – Legendär ("Legendary")
- 2011: Vorstadtkrokodile 3 – Rendezvous ("Appointment/Date")

=== Track listings ===
Von vorne durch die Punkallee (Straight Through Punk Avenue)

- 1. Am Meer
- 2. Von Vorne ("Straight")
- 3. Schönes Mädchen ("Attractive Girl")
- 4. A Few Days
- 5. Kompliment ("Compliment")
- 6. Rockstar
- 7. Für Dich ("For You")
- 8. Ich Wär so Gern ("I'm a Volunteer Boy")
- 9. Punkstorm
- 10. Bikini Frau ("Bikini's Woman")
- 11. Antirassismus ("Anti-Racism")
- 12. Outro

Invasion der Killerpilze (Invasion of the Killerpilze)

- 1. Ferngesteuert ("Remote-controlled")
- 2. Stubenrocker ("Homerocker")
- 3. Richtig Scheisse (auf 'ne schöne Art und Weise) ("Really Shitty (In a Good Way)")
- 4. Sommer ("Summer")
- 5. Springt hoch ("Jump High")
- 6. Scheissegal ("Don't Give a Shit")
- 7. Ich kann auch ohne dich ("I Can Go On Without You Too")
- 8. Blümchensex ("Floretsex")
- 9. Komm mit ("Come along")
- 10. Ich habe recht ("I'm right")
- 11. Hier und jetzt ("Here and now")
- 12. Lass mich los ("Release Me")
- 13. Ich hasse dich ("I Hate You")
- 14. Wach auf ("Wake Up")

Mit Pauken und Raketen (With Kettledrums and Rockets)

- 1. Los ("Slack")
- 2. Der Moment ("The Moment")
- 3. Liebmichhassmich ("Lovemehateme")
- 4. Meine Welt dreht sich ("My world is turning")
- 5. Für mich geschaffen ("Created for me")
- 6. Ich will Gerechtigkeit ("I Want Justice")
- 7. Wir ("We")
- 8. 40 Tage 13 Stunden ("40 Days 13 Hours")
- 9. Ich bin raus ("I'm out")
- 10. Stress Im Nightliner ("Stress in the Sleeper Bus")
- 11. Richtig oder falsch ("True or False")
- 12. Ich brauche nichts ("I Don't Need Anything")
- 13. Andere Zeit ("Different Time")
- 14. Letzte Minute ("Last Minute")

Lautonom

- 1. Drei ("Three")
- 2. Es geht auch um dich ("It's about you, too")
- 3. Halbromantisch ("Half Romantic")
- 4. Rendezvous ("Appointment/Date")
- 5. Am Meer ("At the Sea")
- 6. Raus ("Out")
- 7. Bankband ("Bank Band")
- 8. Lieblingssong ("Favourite song")
- 9. Denken ("Think")
- 10.Ego ("Ego")
- 11. Grauer Vorhang ("Grey curtain")
- 12.Schwarzer Kreis ("Black Circle")
- 13.Plastik ("Plastic")

Ein Bisschen Zeitgeist

- 1. Boom
- 2. Wenn Blicke treffen ("When Gazes Meet")
- 3. Jubel und Staub ("Jubilation and Dust")
- 4. Komm Komm.com ("Come Come.com")
- 5. Marie
- 6. Albtrauma
- 7. So Weit so Gut ("So Far So Good")
- 8. Zeitgeist
- 9. Schicksalsschiess ("Fate Shit")
- 10. Morgenland ("The Orient")
- 11. 97 Tage ("97 Days")
- 12. Alles Kaputt ("Everything's broken")

Grell

- 1. Jäger (Das kann doch nicht alles sein Pt.I)
- 2. Grell
- 3. Die Stadt klingt immer noch nach uns ("The city still sounds according to us")
- 4. Erster Zug nach Paris ("First train to Paris")
- 5. Nimm mich mit (" Take me with you")
- 6. Sommerregen ("Summer rain")
- 7. A.W.I.T.M. ("All I have to do")
- 8. Studieren ("Study")
- 9. Atomic
- 10. Lauf (Das kann doch nicht alles sein Pt.II) ("Running")
- 11. Himmel I (Prelude) ("Heaven I")
- 12. Himmel II ("Heaven II")
- 13. Himmel III ("Heaven III")
