= Hillevi Svedberg =

Swedish Functionalist architect

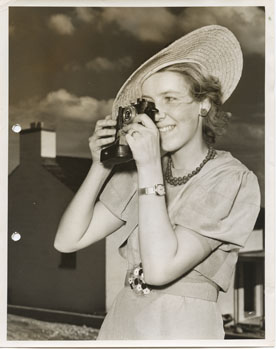
Hillevi Svedberg in 1937

Hillevi Svedberg (1910–1990) was an early Swedish female architect whose work was inspired by Functionalism. She is remembered for introducing showers and bathrooms in working-class housing and for her low-cost collective housing developments with children's care centres. One of her most successful buildings was the Yrkeskvinnornas Kollektivhus or YK-House (1939) in Stockholm's Gärdet district which she designed in collaboration with Albin Stark (1885–1960).

== Early life ==
Born on 20 December 1910 in Uppsala, Hillevi Svedberg was the daughter of the Nobel chemistry laureate Theodor Svedberg and the physician Andrea Andreen. Her brother Elias Svedberg (1913–1987) was an interior designer. She studied architecture at Stockholm's Royal Institute of Technology, graduating in 1933. Only very few Swedish women had studied architecture as until 1921, it was only available for men. On 29 June 1933, she married the engineer Knut Robert Knutsson Almström (1907–1980).

== Career ==
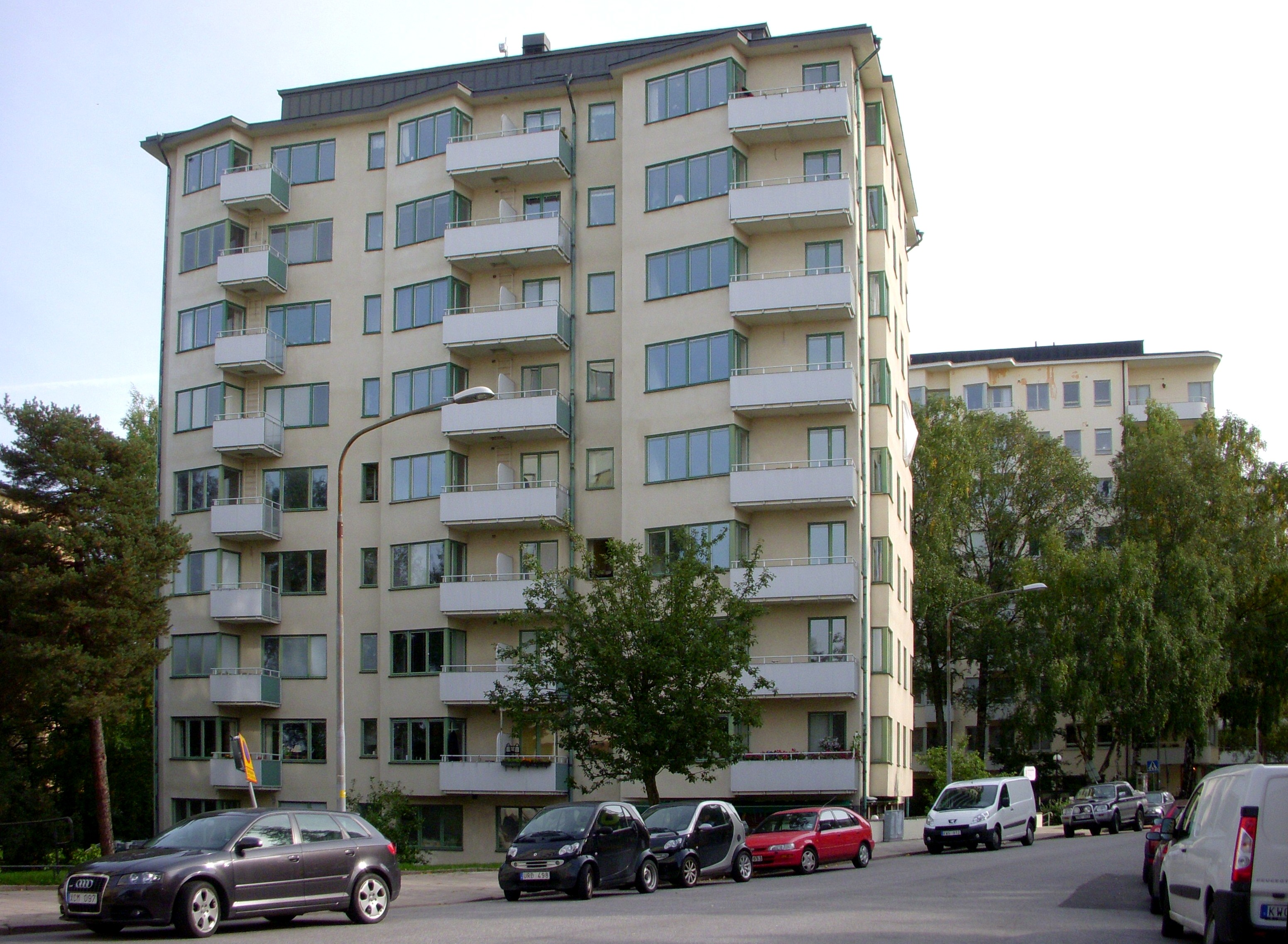
The YK-House

Immediately after her graduation, she was employed by the architect Carl Otto Hallström, but soon established her own business. Inspired by her mother's concern for social work and Hallström's involvement with the national health authority, she worked on the design of retirement homes, schools and orphanages. In 1933, together with Sven Markelius, she turned to more radical work, participating in the design of the collective housing building on Stockholm's John Ericssonsgatan. With its 57 apartments, a restaurant and a children's day care centre, it was Sweden's first development in collective housing.

Even more successful was the building she designed in collaboration with Albin Stark. Commissioned by Yrkeskvinnornas Klubb (the Professional Women's Club) it became known as the YK-House. It was completed in 1939 in the Gärdet district of the city. Stark designed the façades while Svedberg had responsibility for the interiors. Drawing on her earlier experience, she installed even larger kitchens and ensured better natural lighting. Like the building on Ericssonsgatan, it also had a restaurant and a day care centre. Svedberg moved into one of the apartments herself, with her husband and initially two children, soon to grow to four. She became fully engaged in collective housing design, writing articles and taking up speaking assignments on her work.

In 1937, Svedberg won a scholarship from the Sweden-America Foundation which allowed her to spend six months in the United States. While there she met Catherine Bauer, Eliel Saarinen, Carl Milles, Walter Gropius and Frank Lloyd Wright and joined a team set up by Franklin D. Roosevelt to plan housing developments.

Hillevi Svedberg died in Stockholm on 19 June 1990.
