= Richville, Holt County, Missouri =

Extinct hamlet in Missouri, U.S.

Richville
- Extinct hamlet
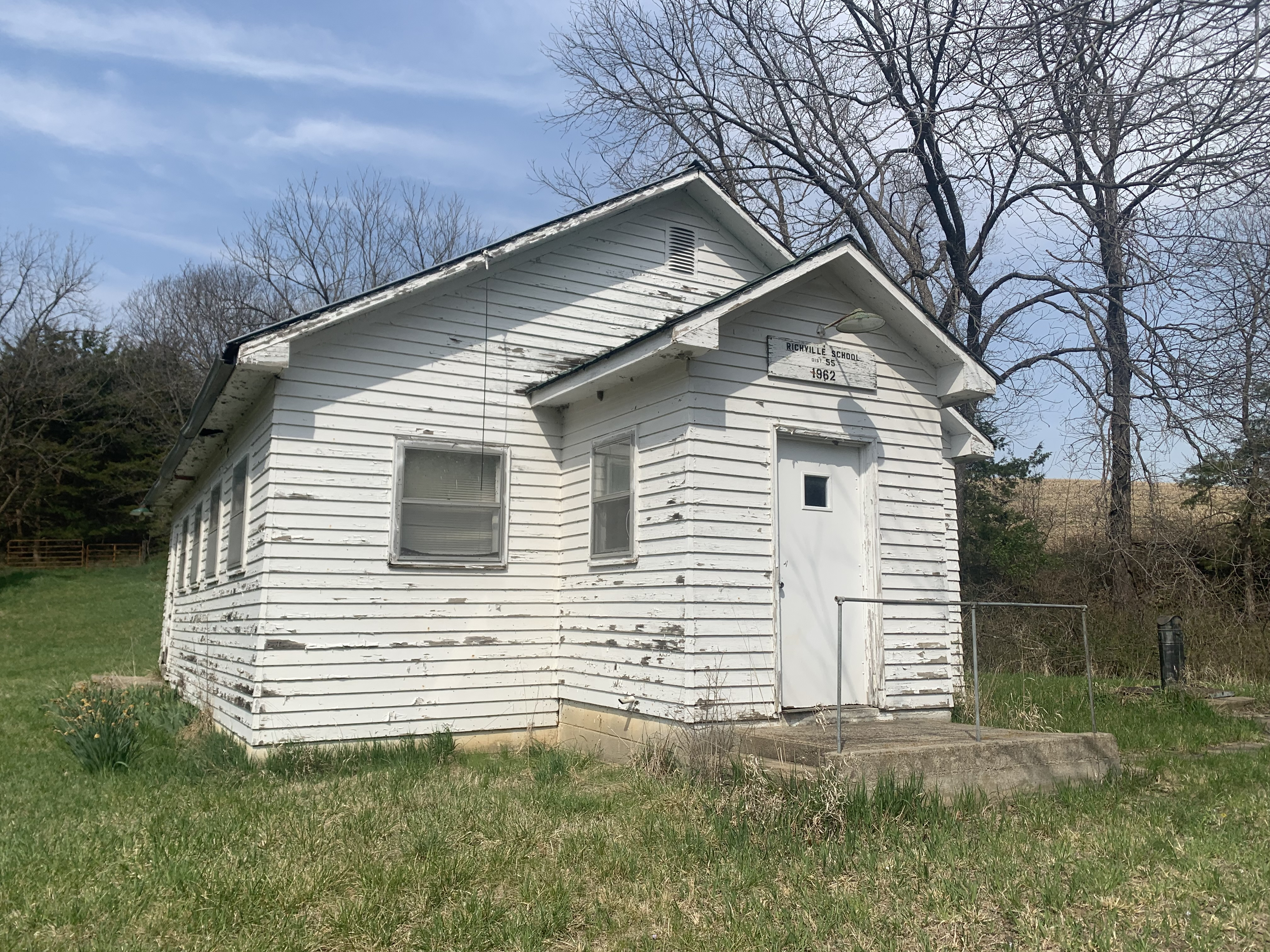
- Richville School in Nodaway Township

- Location within the state of Missouri
- Coordinates: 39°59′23″N 95°02′52″W
- Country: United States
- State: Missouri
- County: Holt
- Township: Nodaway
- Founded: 1860
- Elevation: 1,034 ft (315 m)

Richville is an extinct community in southeastern Holt County, in the U.S. state of Missouri. Richville was located about 5 miles east of county seat Oregon and 5 miles southwest of Fillmore in Andrew County.

== History ==
Richville was founded in 1860 and named for the richness of its soil. There are two variant names, Helwig and Richeville. The original platting of Richville was nine blocks. A post office called Helwig was established in 1895, and remained in operation until 1905; afterward the mail went through nearby Oregon. The hamlet dissipated by the not long after the beginning of the 20th century.
