= Christoph von Hellwig =

German physician (1663–1721)

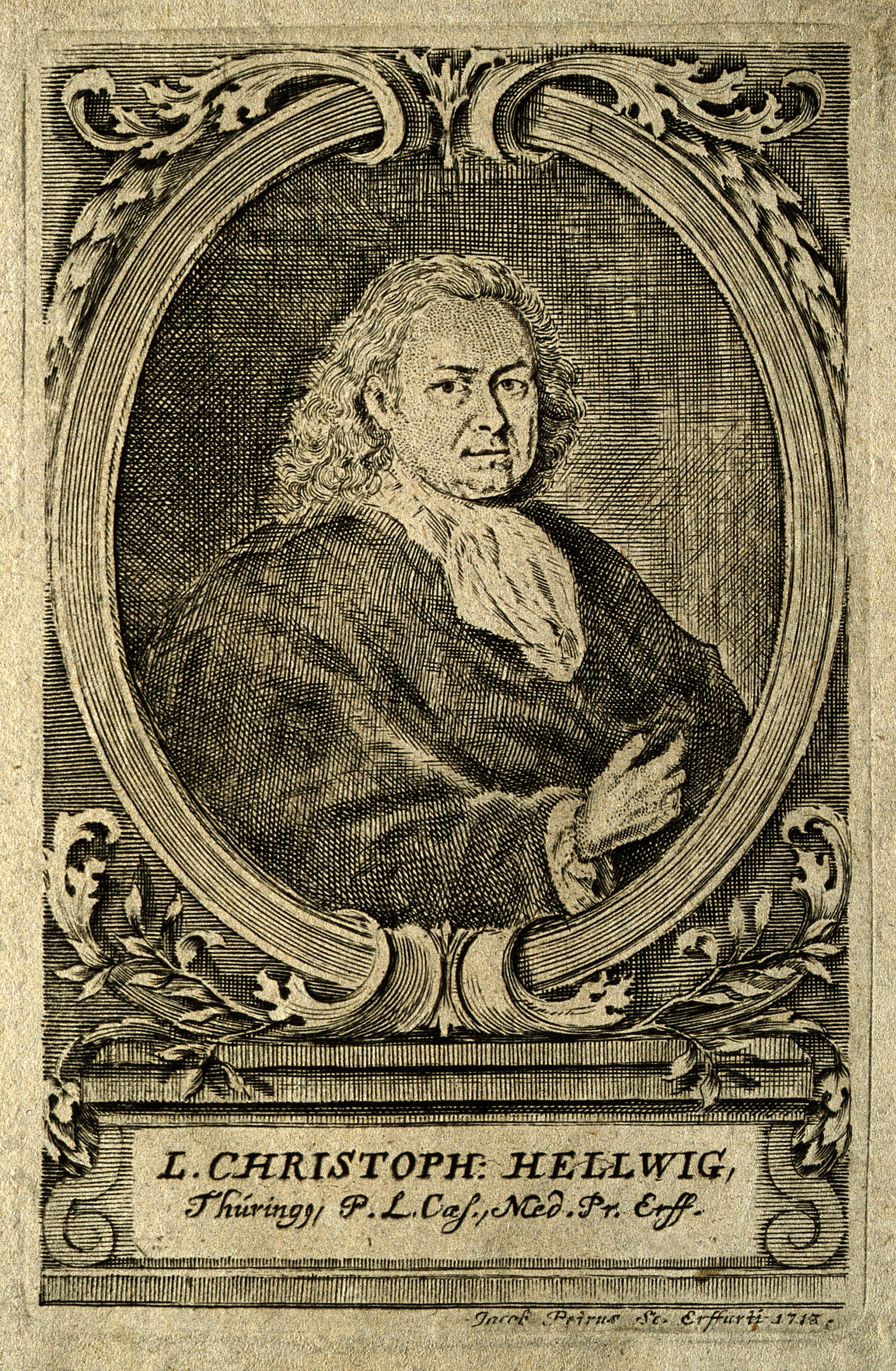

Christoph von Hellwig (15 July 1663 – 27 May 1721) was a German physician and alchemist as well as a prolific writer and publicist. He wrote under several pseudonyms including Valentin Kräutermann, Caspar Schröder and Constans Alitophilus Hertzberger. He served as a physician in Weißensee, Frankenhausen, Tennstedt and Erfurt at various times. He is considered as one of the inventors and promoters of the modern toothbrush.

== Life and work ==
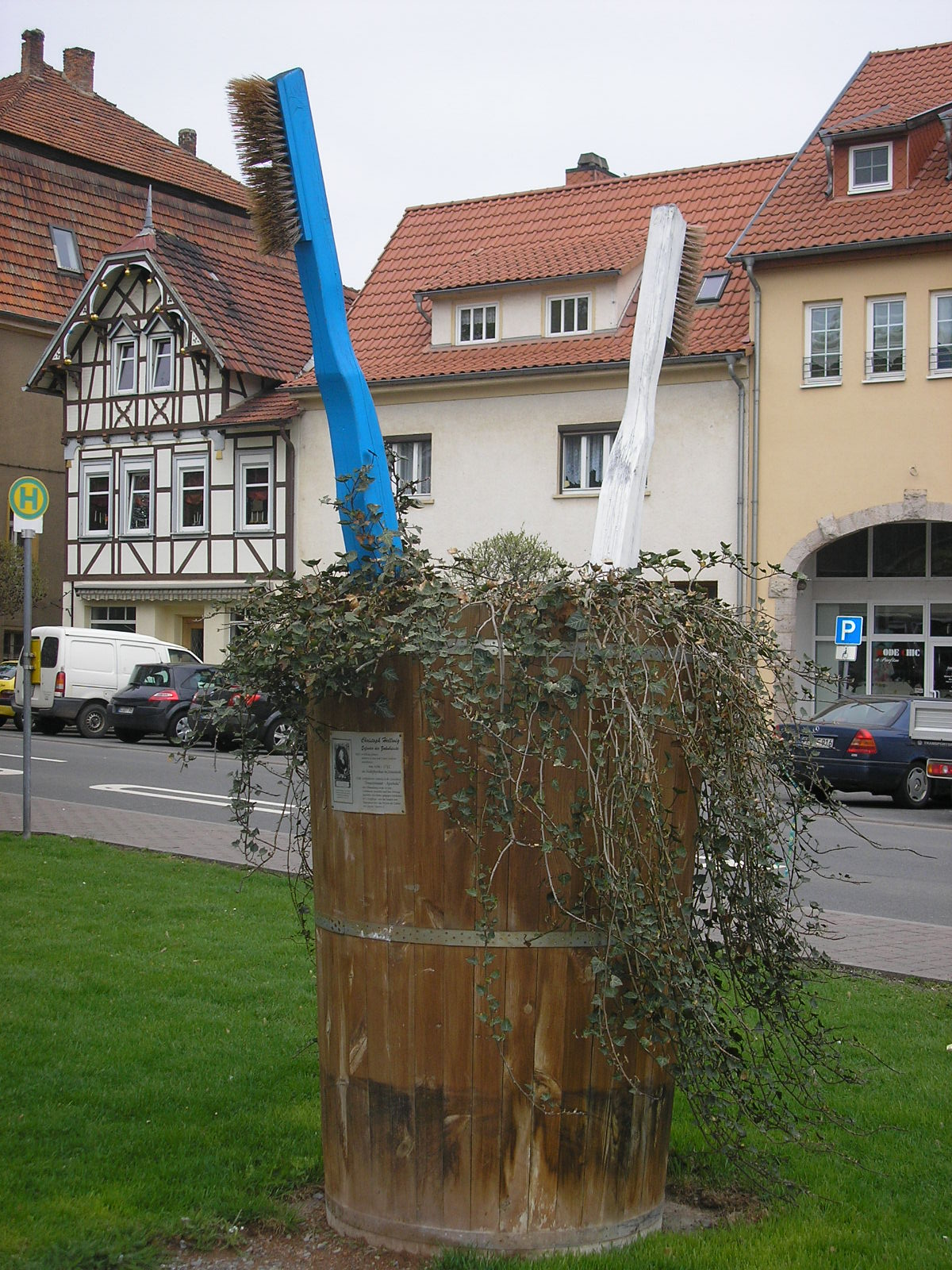
Toothbrush memorial in the Bad Tennstedt marketplace

Hellwig was born in Kölleda, Thuringia, in a parish household. His father Caspar was a deacon in the Lutheran church, married to Sibylla, daughter of Otto Willibald Hoffmann (1600–1666). Both parents were from Kindelbrück and were supported by the nobles of Werthern. His older brothers Johann Otto (born 1654) and Gottfried Christoph (born 1659) became physicians. He went to elementary school in Kölleda, followed by private lessons in Wiehe from 1676. In 1680 he spent a year at the Ratsschule in Hamburg. In 1681 he went to the University of Jena where he attended classes in philosophy under Georg Schubart, Caspar Sagittarius and Caspar Posner and got into some disputes. He then switched to medicine and studied under Georg Wolfgang Wedel, August Heinrich Fasch and Rudolf Wilhelm Krauß. He interned under his brother Johann Otto after 1684 and in 1684 he became an advisor to the privy councillor in the court of Frederick of Saxe-Gotha. He then went to the University of Erfurt with support from his brothers and continued his medical studies and completed it in 1688. He married a pastor's daughter, Christina Regina Kratzenstein, in Erfurt in 1688. He then began to practice privately in Weißensee followed by Frankenhausen (1693). Here he wrote a disputation on diseases of virgins. He received a licentiate of medicine in 1693 after which be became a city physician for Tennstedt in 1696.

Von Hellwig wrote extensively about his medical work. He took an interest in alchemy and tried to work on the notes of his brother Johann Otto who died in 1698. He believed in the medicinal applications of gold. In 1700 he wrote in the Frauenzimmer-Apotheke, a description of wood or metal handled toothbrush with horsehair bristles for dental hygiene. This is considered as one of the earliest descriptions of a modern toothbrush which replaced older methods like sawdust chewing and cleaning with cloth and powders. A monument to the toothbrush stands in Tennstedt today. In his book of 1709 he notes the pharmacist Johann Ludwig Möller as his godfather and friend while he dedicated a 1714 book to Johann Friedrich Weyland (referred to as his brother-in-law). In 1712 he gave up medical practice and moved to Erfurt where he promoted himself publicly. He was involved in a mail-order pharmaceutical business and wrote under various pseudonyms including Caspar Schröder, Constans Alitophilus Hertzberger, and Valentin Kräutermann. He was ennobled in 1716. As many as 240 works have been traced which include medical, alchemical, and astrological works as well as poetry. Georg Christoph Petri von Hartenfels declared him a Poeta laureatus. He also published a hundred-year calendar of weather predictions. Most of his works were in German rather than in Latin and several were targeted at female readers (including the ones on dental care – such as the toothbrush article and an anatomical flap book modified on the work of Johannes Remmelin). Under the pseudonym Valentin Kräutermann he wrote Der sichere Augen- und Zahn-Arzt (The Safe Eye and Tooth Doctor), in 1732. Another book, Curieuser und Vernünftiger Urin-Arzt, written under the pseudonym of Kräutermann in 1738 noted how pulse can vary when a doctor begins to measure it.
