= Judith Hellwig =

Austrian operatic soprano

- Born: 19 August 1906; Neusohl, Kingdom of Hungary, Austria-Hungary
- Died: 25 January 1993 (aged 86) Vienna, Austria
- Occupation: operatic soprano

Judith Hellwig (19 August 1906 – 25 January 1993) was an Austrian operatic soprano.

== Career ==
Born in Neusohl, (today Banská Bystrica in Slovakia), Hellwig made her debut at the opera house in Saarbrücken. In 1938, she created the role of Ursula in Hindemith's Mathis der Maler at the Zürich Opera which brought her international fame. Hellwig was of Jewish faith and had to go into exile in the United States as the Second World War approached, before moving to Buenos Aires. After the war, she returned to Europe and was hired by the Vienna State Opera, where she remained until 1972.

Among her other outstanding roles was the voice of the falcon in Strauss' Die Frau ohne Schatten, conducted by Karl Böhm in 1955. She also portrayed Judith very expressively, despite the Hungarian diction efforts she had to make for the role in Bartók's Bluebeard's Castle.

Hellwig died on 25 January 1993 in Vienna at age 86.

== Sources ==
- Booklet of CD ARL81-82, The Finest Records of Walter Susskind, vol. 1, Bluebeard's Castle, The Wooden Prince, Cantata Profana, New Symphony Orchestra and Chorus of London, Arlecchino.
