= Helbig =

Helbig is a German surname. Notable people with the surname include:

- Allen Helbig (born 1964), American artist, graphic designer, illustrator, animator, photographer
- Don Helbig, American amusement park manager
- Grace Helbig (born 1985), American comedian, actress and internet personality
- Joachim Helbig (1915–1985), officer and pilot in the German Luftwaffe bomber arm
- Kurt Helbig (1901–1975), German weightlifter
- Sebastian Helbig (born 1977), German footballer
- Sven Helbig, German composer, director and music producer
- Thomas Helbig (born 1967), German artist
- Wolfgang Helbig (1839–1915), German classical archaeologist

== See also ==
- Knippers Helbig, engineering firm based in Stuttgart and New York City
