= Christoph Helvig =

German chronologist, historian, theologian and linguist

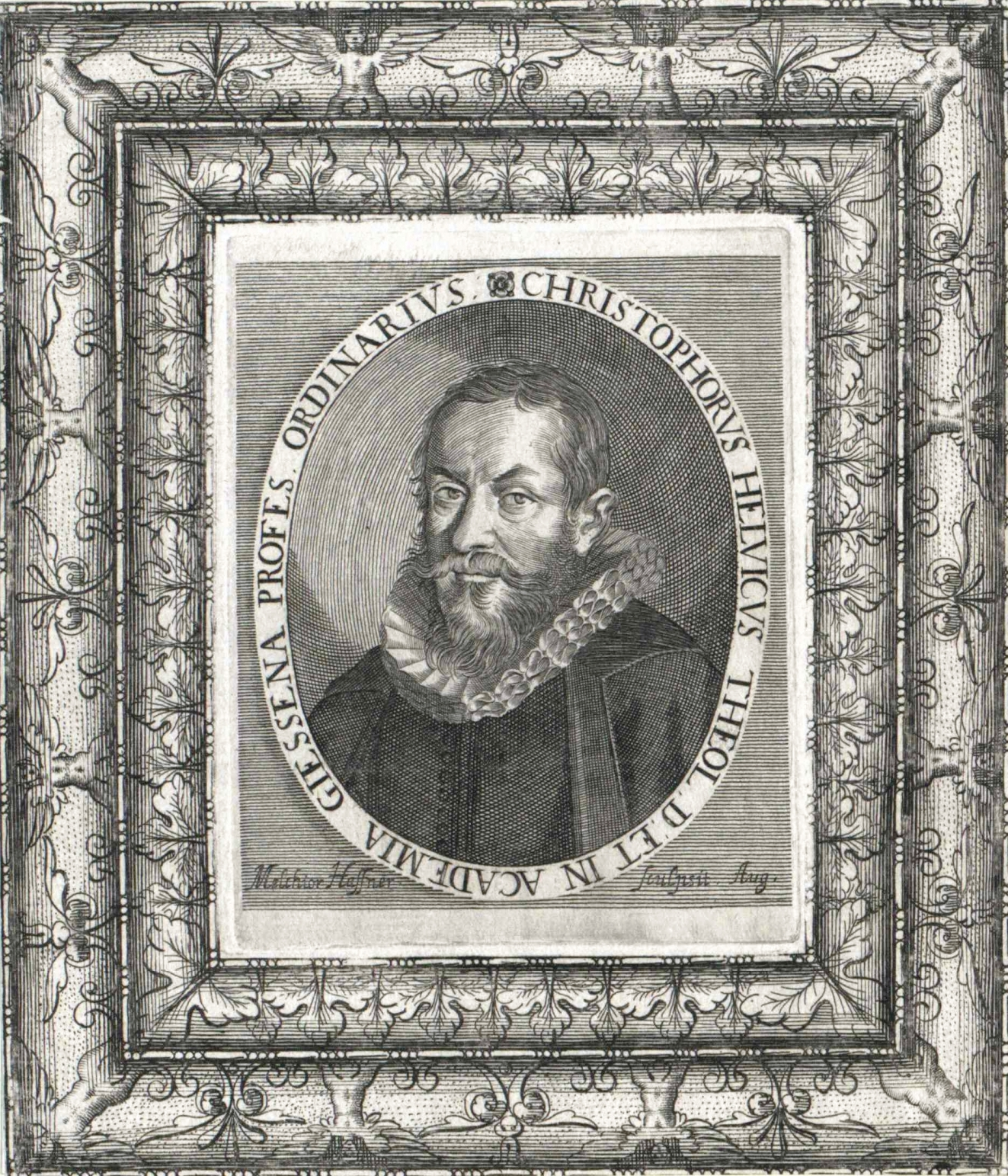
Christoph Helvig (1581–1617)

Christoph Helvig (1581–1617) was a German chronologist, historian, theologian, and linguist.

Helvig was born at Sprendlingen. In chronology he generally was a follower of Joseph Scaliger. He is mentioned by Sir Thomas Browne, and John Locke. He remained an authority cited well into the eighteenth century; Samuel Johnson's General Plan of Education described a course in this way:

The technical part of chronology, or the art of computing and adjusting time, as it is very difficult, so it is not of absolute necessity, but should, however, be taught, so far as it can be learned without the loss of those hours which are required for attainments of nearer concern. The student may join with this treatise Le Clerc's Compendium of History; and afterwards may, for the historical part of chronology, procure Helvicus's and Isaacson's Tables; and, if he is desirous of attaining the technical part, may first peruse Holder's Account of Time, Hearne's Ductor Historicus, Strauchius, the first part of Petavius's Rationarium Temporum; and, at length, Scaliger de Emendatiene Temporum. And, for instruction in the method of his historical studies, he may consult Hearne's Ductor Historicus, Wheare's Lectures, Rawlinson's Directions for the Study of History; and, for ecclesiastical history, Cave and Dupin, Baronius and Fleury.

His Theatrum historicum et chronologicum was published in 1609.

The Compendiosa Institutio Linguæ Ebraicae was a Hebrew grammar. He became professor of Greek and Oriental languages and of theology at the University of Giessen.

== Bibliography ==
- Nathanael Riemer: The Christian Hebraist Christoph Helwig (1581–1617) and His Rendering of Jewish Stories in (His Work) „Jüdische Historien“. In: European Journal of Jewish Studies. Jg. 6 (2012), Nr. 1, S. 71–104.
