= Johann Christian Ludwig Hellwig =

German mathematician, entomologist and wargame designer

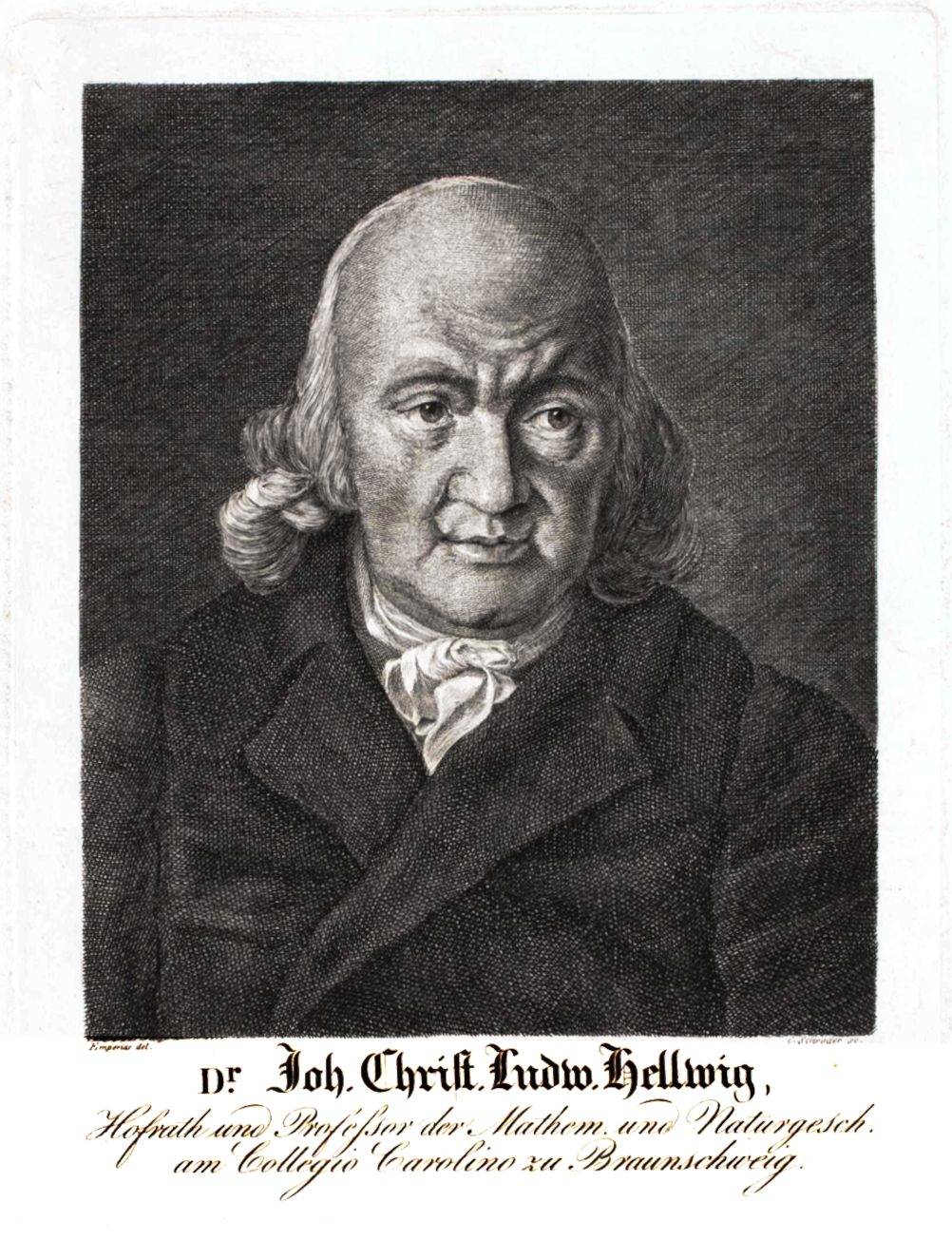

Johann Christian Ludwig Hellwig (8 November 1743, in Garz/Rügen – 10 October 1831, in Braunschweig) was a German mathematician, entomologist and wargame designer. He was a professor of mathematics at the Collegium Carolinum in Braunschweig.

== Biography ==
Hellwig was born in Garz, Pomerania, son of Friedrich Ludwig Wilhelm and Dorothea nee Kolbe. After studies of mathematics and natural history at the university of Frankfurt, he became, in 1766, adviser to prince Wilhelm Adolf von Braunschweig at the time of his grand tour in the south of Russia. The prince died during this journey at Oczakow and Hellwig returned to Braunschweig (Brunswick) in 1770.

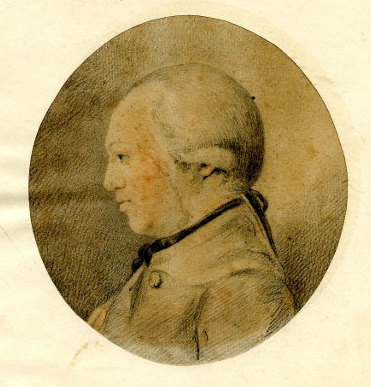
Hellwig in 1774

In 1771, he was appointed teacher of mathematics and natural sciences in two colleges of Brunswick. In 1773 he received a doctorate from the University of Helmstedt. In 1790 he was appointed to teach mathematics and natural sciences at the Collegium Carolinum in Braunschweig, becoming full professor in 1802. He taught mathematics when the College Carolinum was converted to the military academy of Braunschweig. Teaching military sciences inspired his work on wargames.

A number of his students became significant mathematicians: Conrad Diedrich Stahl, professor in Jena, then in Landshut and later in Munich, Karl Bartels, state councilor and professor in Dorpat, Brandan Mollweide in Leipzig, the astronomer A.H. Christian Gelpke in Braunschweig, Friedrich Wilhelm Spehr in Brunswick, Karl Graeffe in Zurich and Karl Friedrich Gauss.

He was the tutor and the father-in-law of the German entomologist Johann Karl Wilhelm Illiger (1775–1813), who became director of the zoological garden of Berlin, of the mineralogist Gottlieb Peter Sillem (who also became a son-in-law and succeeded him at the school of Braunschweig) and the count Johann Centurius Hoffmannsegg (1766–1849). At his death he had served the state of Brunswick for 60 years and the ducal family for 65 years.

He founded the Brunswick general widows’ fund, now a general life insurance institution, and was responsible for the actuarial calculations ensuring its viability.

He worked in the taxonomy of the insects in collaboration with Illiger and Hoffmannsegg, and his insect collection, together with theirs, was the origin of the insect collection of the University of Berlin.

== Hellwig's wargame ==
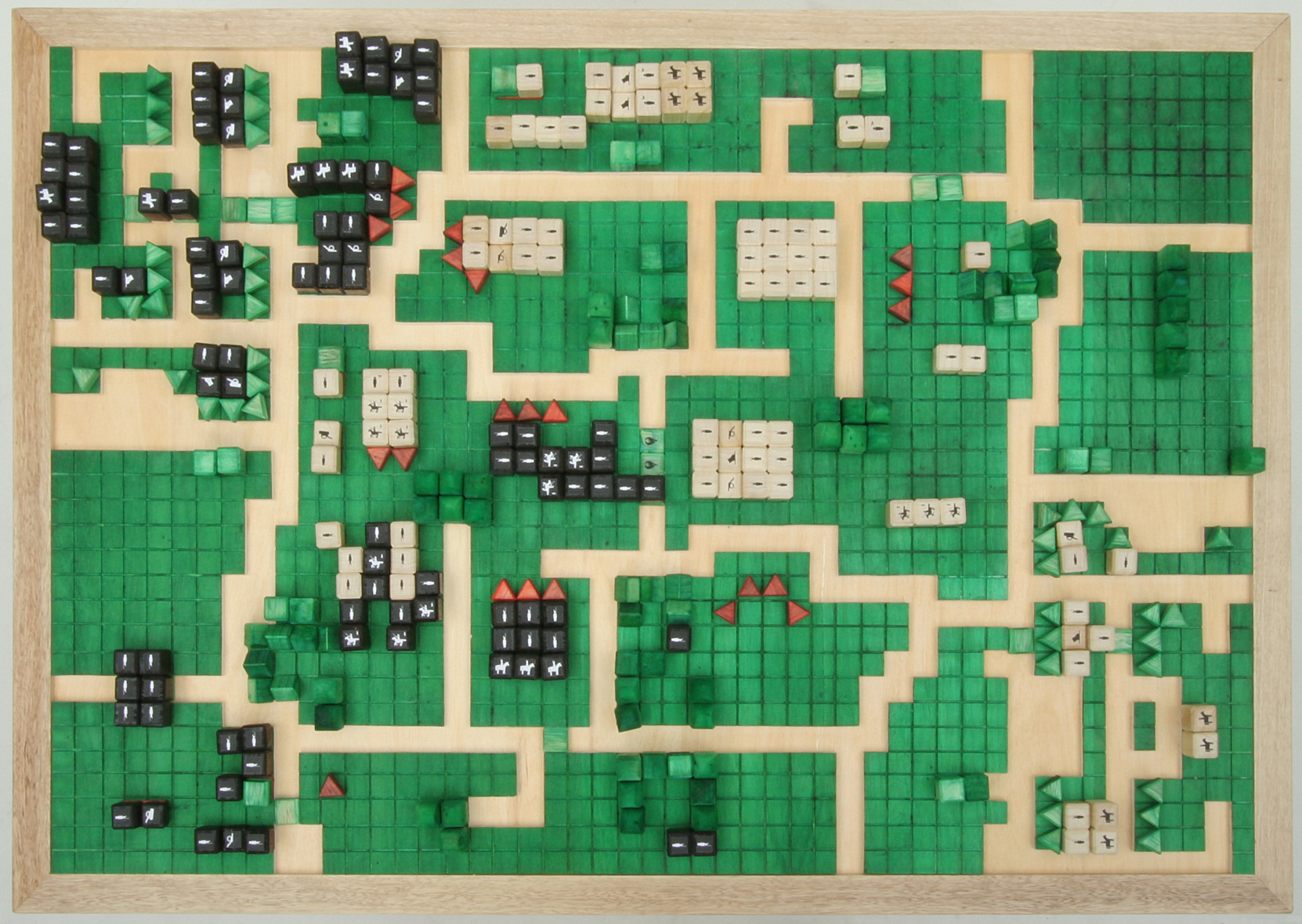
A reconstruction of Hellwig's wargame, based on his 1780 manual.

Hellwig was the inventor of kriegsspiel (literally war game), a sophisticated variant of chess which had much success in its time. Hellwig published the first edition of his kriegsspiel in 1780 as Versuch eines aufs Schachspiel gebaueten taktischen Spiels von zwey und mehreren Personen zu spielen, or "Attempt to build upon chess a tactical game which two or more persons might play." His objective was to try to create a chess-like game that better reflected the military science of the day, especially the behavior of infantry, cavalry and artillery.

His initial kriegsspiel vastly expanded the chess board (he usually employed a board of 49 ranks by 33 files, for 1617 squares) and radically changed the behavior of pieces, as well as introducing several new pieces. Rather than depicting only the abstract space of chess, his board had varying terrain types, including mountains, swamps and water squares. Rather than capturing the king to win, one had to occupy an enemy fortress.

Hellwig further refined his game over the next twenty years, publishing in 1803 his revised Das Kriegsspiel, which dispensed with the trappings of chess entirely and substituted for chess pieces new units representing the military branches of his era. His game spawned numerous contemporary imitators, and its fundamental innovations influenced Reisswitz Sr. and Jr.'s games (1810s and 20s), and eventually formed the basis of the hobby board wargames pioneered by Avalon Hill in the twentieth century.

== Some related publications ==
- Hellwig, J.C.L. (1777). Beginnings of general mathematics and arithmetic: for the use of his listeners / by M. Johann Christian Ludewig Hellwig, public teacher of mathematics of the dukes. Pages and at the two grammar schools in Braunschweig, members of the Royal Prussian Society for the benefit of the arts and sciences in Frankfurt an der Oder (in German). Braunschweig: Waisenhaus-Buchdruckerey.
- Hellwig, J.C.L. (1780). Attempt at a tactical game based on chess: to be played by two or more people (in German). Leipzig: Crusius. pp. I=XXXVIII, 1–164.
- Rossi, P.; Hellwig, J.C.L (1795). Fauna Etrusca Sistens Insecta: Tomus Primus. Cum XI Tab. Fleckeisen: Helmstadii. pp. I–XXVIII, 1–457.
- Rossi, P.; Illiger, D.C. (1807). Fauna Etrusca Sistens Insecta: Tomus Secundus. Iterum Edita Et Annotatis Perpetuis Avcta D. Carolo Illiger. Fleckeisen: Helmstadii. pp. I–VI, 1–511.
