= Amalia von Helvig =

German and Swedish artist (1776–1831)

Anna Amalia von Helvig
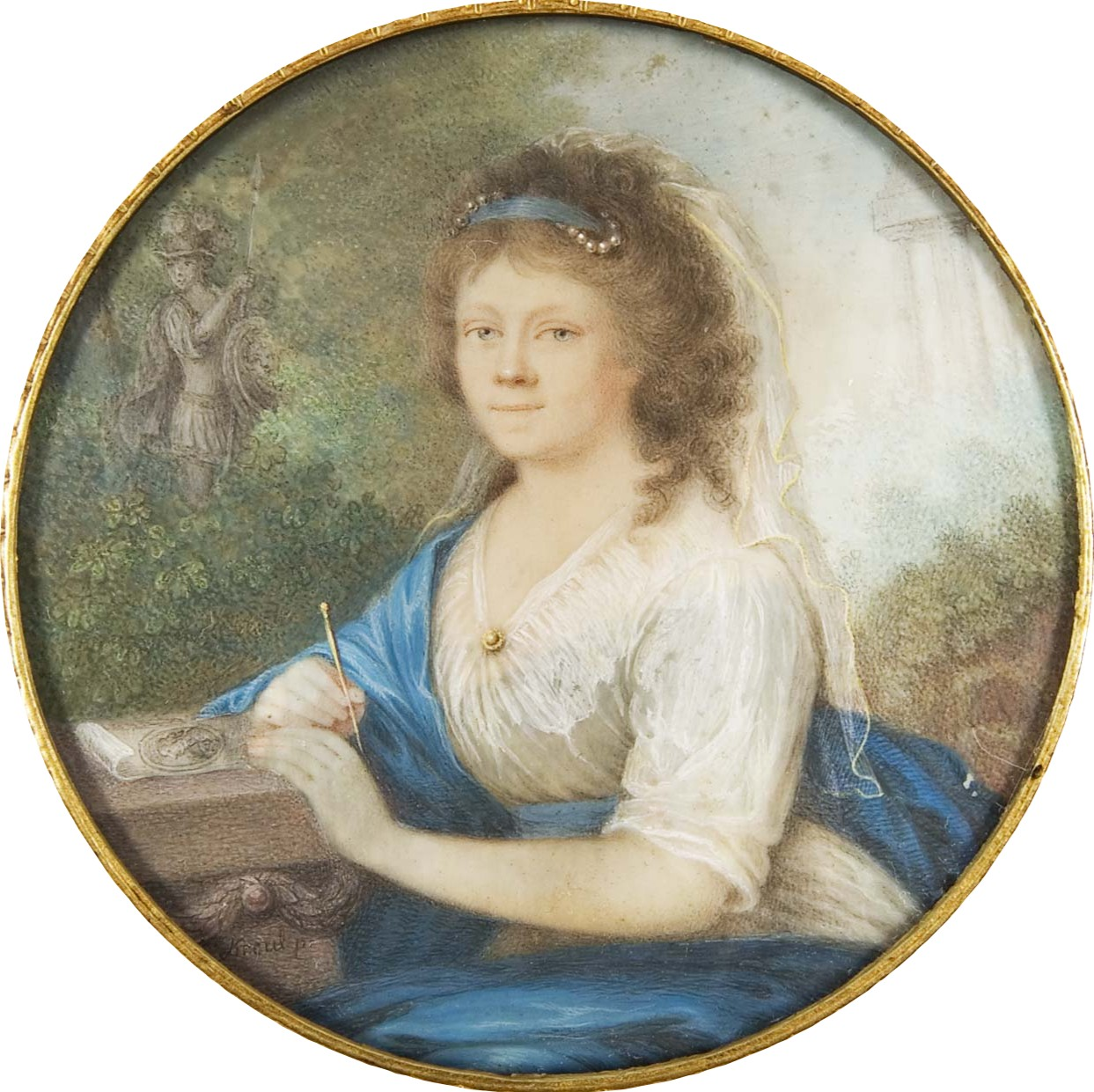
- Amalia von Helvig in a miniature portrait by Johann Lorenz Kreul.
- Born: August 16, 1776; Weimar
- Died: December 17, 1831 (aged 55); Berlin
- Other name: Amalie von Helwig
- Occupations: artist, writer, translator, salonist

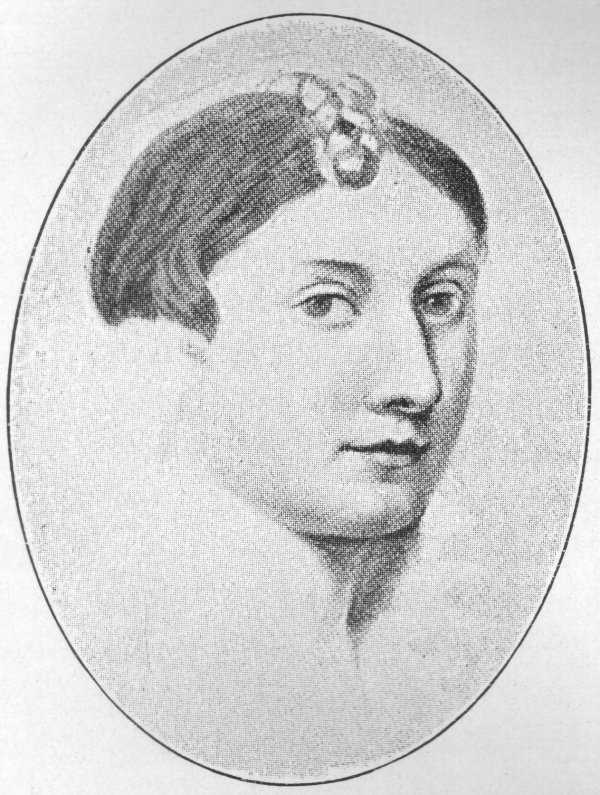
Amalia von Helvig (1776–1831)

Anna Amalia von Helvig (August 16, 1776 – September 17, 1831) was a German and Swedish artist, writer, translator, socialite, Salonist and culture personality. She is known as an inspiration for many artists. She was a member of the Royal Swedish Academy of Arts.

== Biography ==
She was born to Baron Carl Christoph von Imhoff of the aristocratic Imhoff family and Luise von Schardt, the niece of Charlotte von Stein. In 1791, she was introduced to the court of Charles Augustus, Grand Duke of Saxe-Weimar-Eisenach in Weimar, where she belonged to the court of Charles' mother Anna Amalia of Brunswick-Wolfenbüttel. She was given a good artistic education and was encouraged by Goethe and Schiller to write poems.

Married in 1803 to General Karl Gottfried von Helvig, she moved to Stockholm in 1804, where she established a salon and became a known personality in the capital's cultural life. She was elected to the Academy of Arts in 1804 and took part in several of its exhibitions between 1804 and 1810. She returned to Germany in 1810, but spent the years from 1814 to 1816 in Sweden, where she resided in Uppsala as a part of the circle around the salonist Malla Silfverstolpe. Her friendship with Erik Gustaf Geijer and Per Daniel Amadeus Atterbom has been much discussed, and she is portrayed as a source of inspiration for many artists; she held a correspondence with Swedish artists after she returned to Germany. In Berlin, she established one of the most important literary salons of the early 19th century.

== In culture ==
Carina Burman portraits the relationship between Amalia von Helvig and Gustaf Geijer in the novel Islandet (2001).

== See also ==
- Christina Charlotta Cederström
- List of German women artists

== Sources ==
- Österberg, Carin et al., Svenska kvinnor: föregångare, nyskapare (Swedish women) Lund: Signum 1990. (ISBN 91-87896-03-6) (in Swedish)
- Svenskt konstnärslexikon (Swedish Art dictionary) Allhems Förlag, Malmö (1952) (in Swedish)
