= Margot Hellwig =

German Volksmusik singer (born 1941)

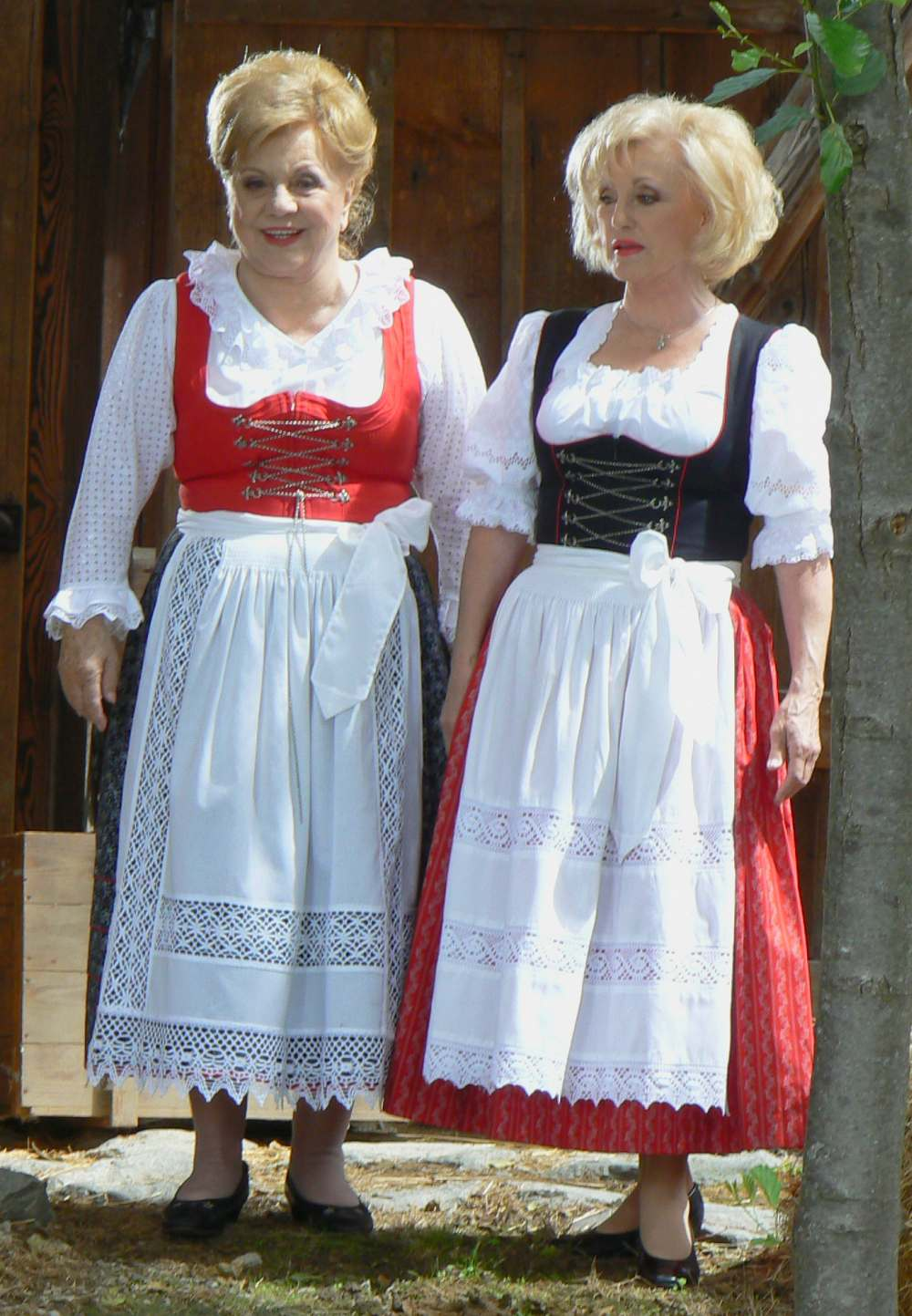
- Hellwig (right) with her mother, Maria, as Maria & Margot Hellwig, at Europa-Park in 2007

Background information
- Born: Margot Fischer; 5 July 1941 (age 85); Reit im Winkl, Bavaria, Germany
- Genre: Alpine folk music
- Occupation: Singer
- Member of: Maria & Margot Hellwig

Margot Hellwig (born Margot Fischer, 5 July 1941 in Reit im Winkl; married as Margot Lindermayr) is a German Alpine folk music (Volksmusik) singer.

She is best known as part of Maria & Margot Hellwig, a German mother-and-daughter Volksmusik duo which was active from 1963 until her mother, Maria Hellwig, died in 2010. The surname Hellwig was a stage name for both singers.
