= Maria Hellwig =

German musician (1920–2010)

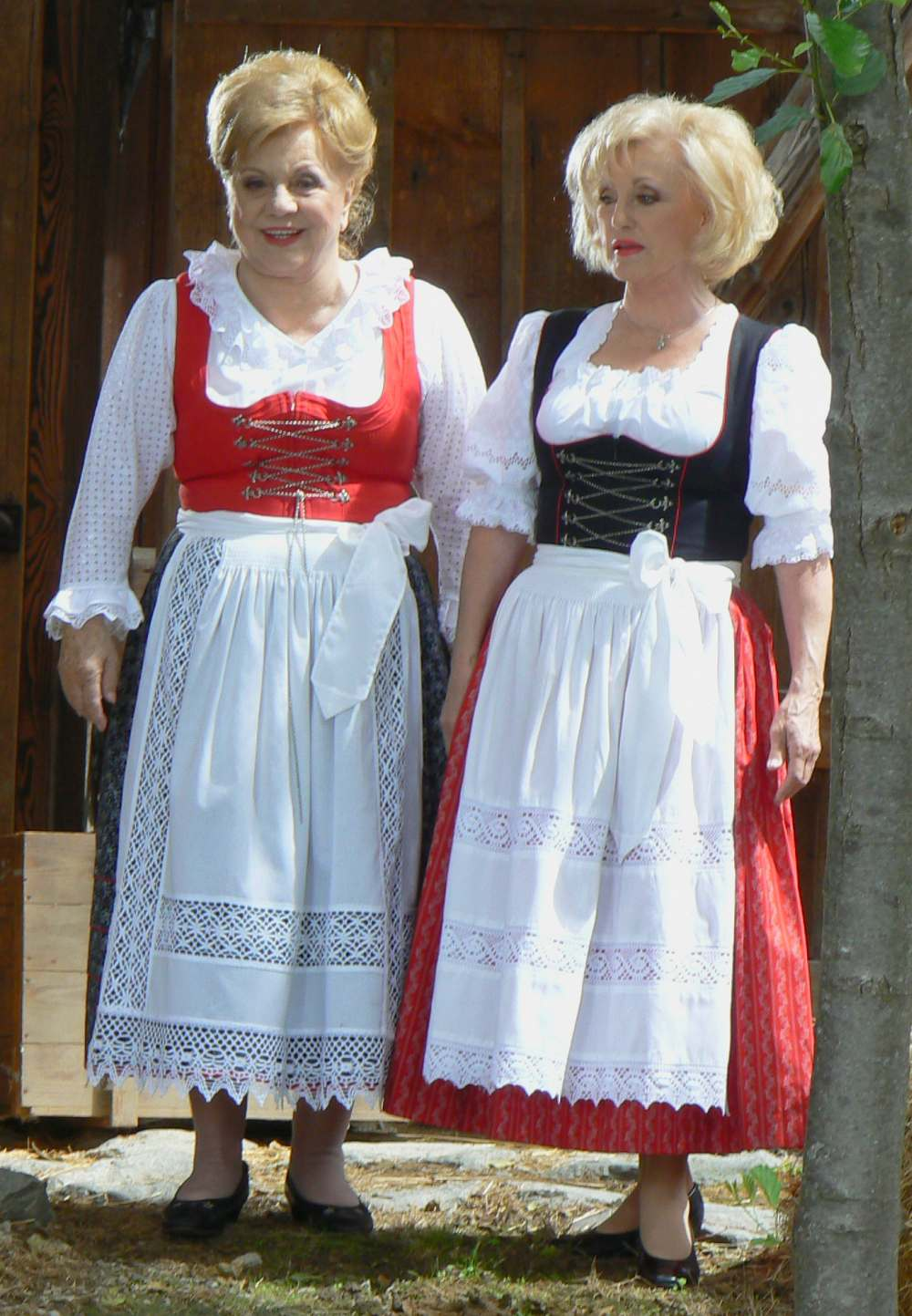
- Maria & Margot Hellwig at Europapark Rust, 2007
- Born: 22 February 1920; Reit im Winkl, Germany
- Died: 26 November 2010 (aged 90); Ruhpolding, Germany
- Occupation: musician
- Known for: yodelling
- Website: http://www.hellwig-musik.de

Maria Hellwig (22 February 1920 – 26 November 2010) was a German yodeler, popular performer of volkstümliche Musik (Alpine folk music), and television presenter.

== Life ==
Maria Neumeier was born in 1920 to Heinrich Neumeier, an electrician, and his wife, Maria, in Reit im Winkl, Bavaria, Germany. At the age of five, she performed for the first time at Bauer Theatre in Reit im Winkl. After leaving school, she took an apprenticeship as a shop assistant. In her spare time, she acted in the theatre and took voice lessons.

She married her first husband, Joseph Fischer, a fellow amateur actor, and had their only child, Margot, on 5 July 1941. Fischer died shortly afterwards while fighting in World War II.

She hosted several music TV-shows in the 1980s and 1990s. Maria became almost blind in 1996. On 26 November 2010, she died in Ruhpolding, Bavaria, Germany.
