= High =

High may refer to:

== Science and technology ==
- (Something) at a large height or altitude
  - Highpointing
  - Lists of highest points
- High (atmospheric), a high-pressure area
- High (computability), a quality of a Turing degree, in computability theory
- High (technical analysis), or top, an event in market-price fluctuations of a security
- High (tectonics), in geology an area where relative tectonic uplift took or takes place
- Substance intoxication, also known by the slang description "being high"
  - Sugar high, a misconception about the supposed psychological effects of sucrose

== Arts and media ==
=== Music ===
==== Bands ====
- High (musical group), a 1974–1990 Indian rock group
- The High, an English rock band formed in 1989

==== Albums ====
- High (The Blue Nile album), 2004
- High (Flotsam and Jetsam album), 1997
- High (New Model Army album), 2007
- High (Royal Headache album), 2015
- High (Keith Urban album), 2024
- High (EP), by Jarryd James, 2016

==== Songs ====
- "High" (Alison Wonderland song), 2018
- "High" (The Chainsmokers song), 2022
- "High" (The Cure song), 1992
- "High" (David Hallyday song), 1988
- "High" (Feeder song), 1997
- "High" (James Blunt song), 2004
- "High" (Knut Anders Sørum song), 2004
- "High" (Lighthouse Family song), 1997
- "High" (Peking Duk song), 2014
- "High" (Sir Sly song), 2017
- "High" (Young Rising Sons song), 2014
- "High", by 5 Seconds of Summer from Calm, 2020
- "High", by Alaska Thunderfuck from Poundcake, 2016
- "High", by Big Sean from Finally Famous, 2011
- "High", by the Blue Nile from High, 2004
- "High", by Corinne Bailey Rae from The Heart Speaks in Whispers, 2016
- "High", by Jarryd James from High (EP), 2016
- "High", by Kool Savas, Samra, and Sido, 2019
- "High", by Ledisi from Let Love Rule, 2017
- "High", by Little Dragon from Season High, 2017
- "High", by María Becerra, 2019
- "High", by Miley Cyrus from Plastic Hearts, 2020
- "High", from High (New Model Army album), 2007
- "High", by Parokya ni Edgar from Buruguduystunstugudunstuy, 1997
- "High", by Prince from The Chocolate Invasion, 2004
- "High", from High (Royal Headache album), 2015
- "High", by Stabbing Westward from Stabbing Westward, 2001
- "High", by Stephen Sanchez from Angel Face, 2023
- "High", by Wethan and Dua Lipa from the Fifty Shades Freed film soundtrack, 2018
- "High", by Young Thug from On the Rvn, 2018
- "High", by Zella Day from Kicker, 2015
- "High (Interlude)", by Lupe Fiasco from Drogas Light, 2017

=== Other arts and media ===
- High (film), a 1967 Canadian film
- High (play), a 2011 play by Matthew Lombardo
- High (TV series), a 2020 Indian web series

== Other uses ==
- High (surname)
- High, Just-As-High, and Third, in Norse mythology, three figures in the Prose Edda
- Secondary school or high school, frequently referred to as either "junior high" or "senior high"

== See also ==
- HI (disambiguation)
- High Road (disambiguation)
- High Street (disambiguation)
- Higher (disambiguation)
- HY (disambiguation)
- Highly Creek, a stream in Missouri
- HAAi, Australian music producer and DJ
