= High Street (disambiguation) =

High Street is the main shopping and business street in towns in the United Kingdom, Australia, and elsewhere.

High Street may also refer to:

== Streets ==
=== United Kingdom ===
==== England ====
- High Street, Barnes, England
- High Street, Bristol, England
- High Street, Cambridge, England (now Trinity Street)
- High Street (Doncaster), England
- High Street, Hampstead, England
- High Street, Hull, England
- High Street, Lincoln, England
- High Street, Liverpool, England
- High Street, Oxford, England
- High Street, Sheffield, England
- High Street, Worthing, England

==== Scotland ====
- High Street, part of the Royal Mile in Edinburgh, Scotland
- High Street, Glasgow, Scotland
- High Street (Perth, Scotland)

==== Wales ====
- High Street, Cardiff, Wales
- High Street, Newport, Wales
- High Street, Swansea, Wales

=== United States ===
- High Street (Columbus, Ohio), United States
- High Street, Philadelphia, United States (now Market Street)
- High Street (Portland, Maine), United States

=== Elsewhere ===
- High Street, Dublin, Ireland
- High Street, Fremantle, Western Australia
- High Street, Hong Kong

== Other uses ==
- Bonifacio High Street, mixed-use development and shopping mall in Bonifacio Global City, Taguig, Metro Manila, Philippines
- High Street (film), 1976 Belgian film
- High Street (TV series), 2024 Philippine TV series
- High Street (Lake District), fell in the Lake District, England
- High Street (ward), Electoral ward in London, England
- High Street, Oxford (painting), 1810 oil painting by J. M. W. Turner
- High Street, Cornwall, hamlet in England
- High Street Phoenix, shopping mall in Mumbai, India
- High Street Records, American record label
- High Street School, Dunedin, former school in Dunedin, New Zealand
- High Street tram stop, former Metrolink stop in Manchester, England

== See also ==
- High Street Historic District (disambiguation)
- High Street station (disambiguation)
- High Road (disambiguation)
- High (disambiguation)
