= James Wyatt Junior (b. 1812), Aged 65 (Millais painting) =

Painting by John Everett Millais

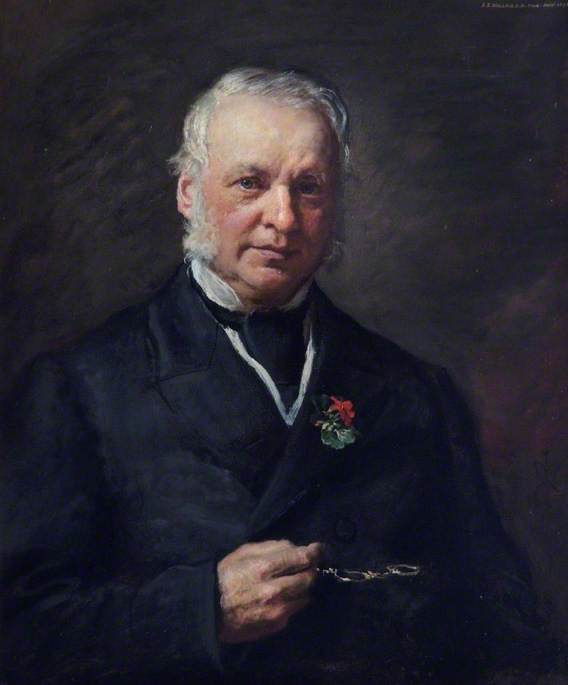
- Artist: John Everett Millais
- Year: 1875
- Type: Oil on canvas
- Dimensions: 73.5 cm × 61 cm (28.9 in × 24 in)
- Location: Oxford Town Hall, Oxford.

James Wyatt Junior (b. 1812), Aged 65 is an 1875 oil on canvas portrait by the English artist John Everett Millais. James Wyatt junior was the son of James Wyatt senior, who was an art dealer, collector and patron, and Mayor of Oxford.

== Background to the painting ==
James Wyatt junior, born in 1810 (note the incorrect date in the painting's title), and died 1882, helped in and latterly succeeded to his father's business at 115 High Street, Oxford. He married Eliza Moorman in 1837 and they had five children: Mary Sarah Bridges Wyatt (born 1845); Sarah Wyatt (born 1849); Eliza Fanny Mayell Wyatt (baptised 1852); James Martin Acland Wyatt (baptised 1853) and Florence Mildred Wyatt (baptised 1855).

James Wyatt junior had known John Everett Millais for a long time - in 1849 Millais had painted both his father James Wyatt senior and his daughter Mary in James Wyatt and his Granddaughter Mary, and four of his children in Portrait of Four Children of the Wyatt Family (Mary and James are identified but the other two are not named); in c. 1850 Millais had painted his wife Eliza and daughter Sarah in Mrs James Wyatt Jr and her Daughter Sarah. James Wyatt junior became a JP in 1874, an event possibly commemorated by this portrait. He died on died 8 August 1882 aged 71 after a short illness.

== Other paintings of the Wyatt family by Millais ==
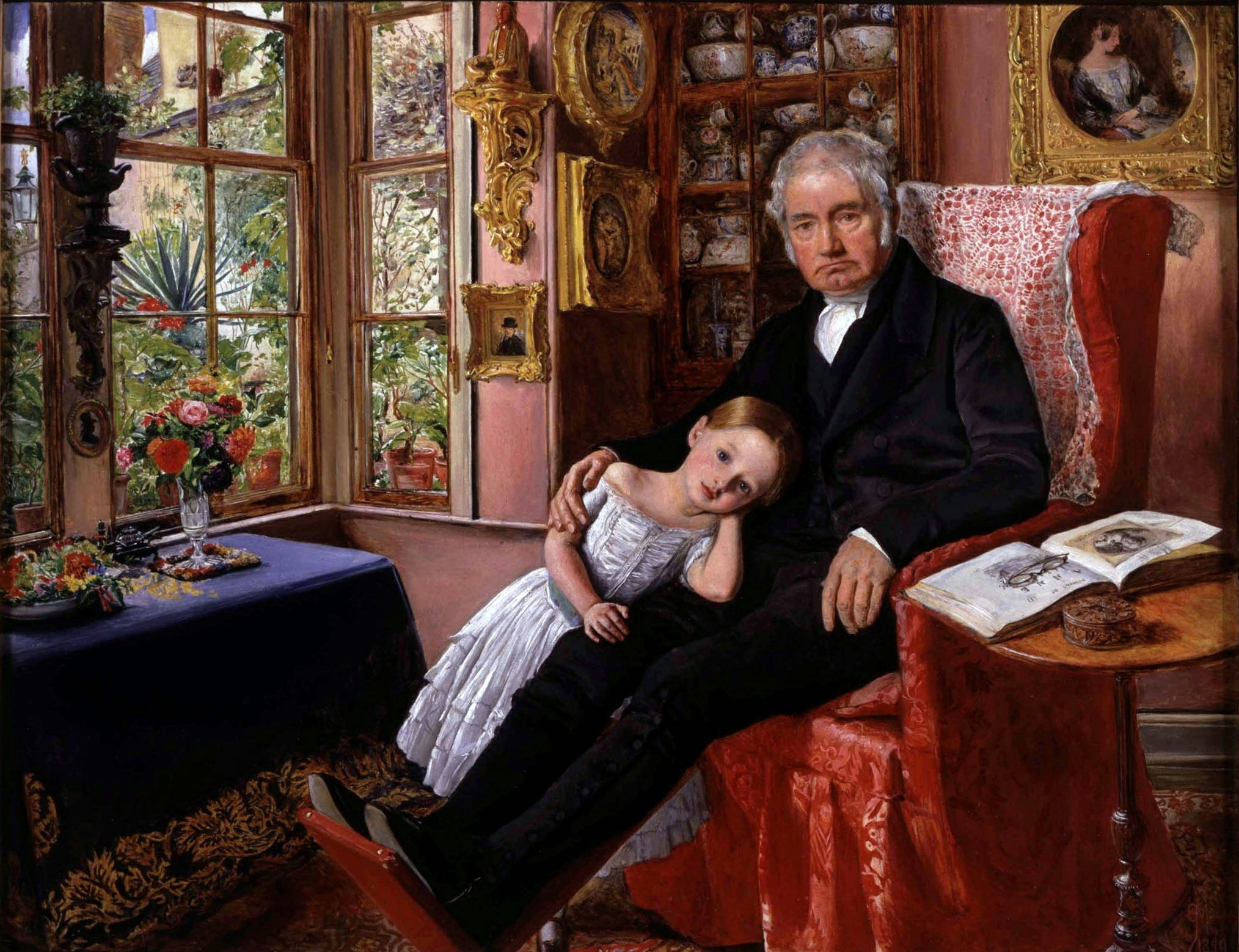
James Wyatt and his Granddaughter Mary, by John Everett Millais, commissioned by James Wyatt senior in 1849.

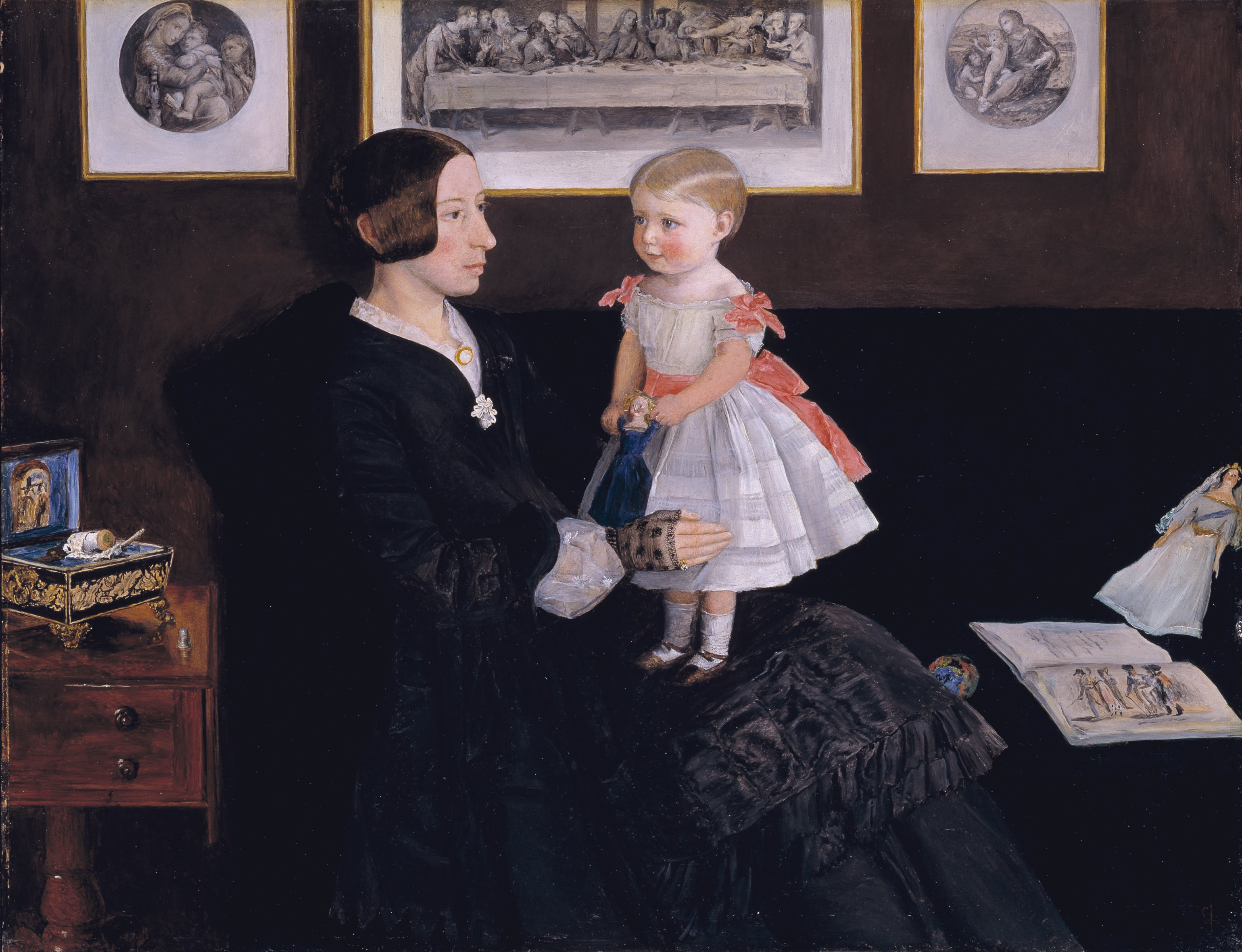
Mrs James Wyatt Jr and her Daughter Sarah, by John Everett Millais, commissioned by James Wyatt senior in 1849.

== See also ==
- List of paintings by John Everett Millais
