= North High Street Historic District =

North High Street Historic District may refer to:

- North High Street Historic District (Holyoke, Massachusetts), listed on the National Register of Historic Places in Hampden County, Massachusetts
- North High Street Historic District (Canal Winchester, Ohio), listed on the National Register of Historic Places in Franklin County, Ohio

== See also ==
- High Street Historic District (disambiguation)
