= Higher =

Higher may refer to:

== Music ==
- The Higher, a 2002–2012 American pop rock band

=== Albums ===
- Higher (Ala Boratyn album) or the title song, 2007
- Higher (Chris Stapleton album) or the title song, 2023
- Higher (Ezio album) or the title song, 2000
- Higher (Harem Scarem album) or the title song, 2003
- Higher (The Horrors album), 2012
- Higher (Life On Planet 9 album) or the title song, 2017
- Higher (Michael Bublé album) or the title song, 2022
- Higher (The Overtones album) or the title song, 2012
- Higher (Regina Belle album) or the title song, 2012
- Higher (Roch Voisine album) or the title song, 2002
- Higher (Treponem Pal album), 1997
- Higher, by Abundant Life Ministries, 2000
- Higher, by ReinXeed, 2009
- Higher, by Russell Robertson, 2008
- Higher!, by Sly and the Family Stone, 2013
- Higher, a mixtape by Remy Banks, 2015

=== Songs ===
- "Higher" (2PM song), 2015
- "Higher" (Budjerah song), 2021
- "Higher" (Burna Boy song), 2024
- "Higher" (Clean Bandit song), 2021
- "Higher" (Creed song), 1999
- "Higher" (Deborah Cox song), 2013
- "Higher" (DJ Khaled song), 2019
- "Higher" (Eminem song), 2020
- "Higher" (Erik Grönwall song), 2009
- "Higher" (The Game song), 2005
- "Higher" (Gloria Estefan song), 1996
- "Higher" (Laura Tesoro song), 2017
- "Higher" (The Naked and Famous song), 2016
- "Higher" (Peter Jöback song), 2000
- "Higher" (Rihanna song), 2016
- "Higher" (The Saturdays song), 2010
- "Higher" (Sigma song), 2015
- "Higher" (Star Pilots song), 2009
- "Higher" (Taio Cruz song), 2010
- "Higher" (Tems song), 2020
- "Higher (Free)", by All About She, 2013
- "Higher", by A.C.E, 2021
- "Higher", by Ally Brooke and Matoma, 2019
- "Higher", by Almah from E.V.O, 2016
- "Higher", by Avenged Sevenfold from The Stage, 2016
- "Higher", by Baauer and Just Blaze, 2013
- "Higher", by Bella Taylor Smith, 2021
- "Higher", by Breakage from Foundation, 2010
- "Higher", by the Cardigans from Gran Turismo, 1998
- "Higher", by Carly Rae Jepsen from Emotion: Side B, 2016
- "Higher", by Devin Townsend Project from Transcendence, 2016
- "Higher", by Don Diablo from Future, 2018
- "Higher", by Edenbridge from Solitaire, 2010
- "Higher", by Emeli Sandé from Kingdom Coming, 2017
- "Higher", by Fifty Fifty, 2022
- "Higher", by Gotthard from Dial Hard, 1994
- "Higher", by Heidi Montag, 2008
- "Higher", by Hilltop Hoods from Drinking from the Sun, Walking Under Stars Restrung, 2016
- "Higher", by Ice Cube from the Higher Learning film soundtrack, 1995
- "Higher", by IShowSpeed, 2025
- "Higher", by Jack Garratt, 2025
- "Higher", by Jason Becker from Perspective, 1996
- "Higher", by Jauz, 2016
- "Higher", by Lily Allen from No Shame, 2018
- "Higher", by Madrugada from Industrial Silence, 1999
- "Higher", by Modestep, 2017
- “Higher”, by NorthTale, 2019
- "Higher", by P.O.D. from Murdered Love, 2012
- "Higher?!", by Pigeon John from And the Summertime Pool Party, 2006
- "Higher", by Ravyn Lenae from Hypnos, 2022
- "Higher", by the Ready Set from The Bad & the Better, 2014
- "Higher", by Sault from 11, 2022
- "Higher", by Shawn Mendes from Wonder, 2020
- "Higher", by Sleep Token from Sundowning, 2019
- "Higher", by Sly & the Family Stone from Dance to the Music, 1968
  - "I Want to Take You Higher", a reworked version by Sly & the Family Stone, 1969
- "Higher", by Social House, 2018
- "Higher", by Starstylers, 2006
- "Higher", by Sun-El Musician from African Electronic Dance Music, 2021
- "Higher", by The-Dream featuring Pusha T, Ma$e and Cocaine 80s from Cruel Summer, 2012
- "Higher", by Tiffany, 2007
- "Higher", by the Vamps from Night & Day, 2017
- "Vyshe" (Russian: Выше, "Higher"), by Nyusha, 2011

== Other uses ==
- Higher (Scottish), a national school-leaving certificate exam and university entrance qualification
- Higher: A Historic Race to the Sky and the Making of a City, a 2003 book by Neal Bascomb

== See also ==
- Higher and Higher (disambiguation)
- Higher Education (disambiguation)
- Take Me Higher (disambiguation)
