= High (surname) =

High is a surname. Notable people with the surname include:

- S. Dale High, American chief executive
- Ed High (1873–1926), American professional baseball player
- Frank C. High (1875–1966), U.S. Army soldier who received the Medal of Honor
- Jake High (fl. 1908–14), American football player and coach
- Jason High (born 1981), American mixed martial artist
- Johnnie High (1929–2010), American impresario
- Johnny High (1957–1987), American professional basketball player
- Joseph Madison High (1855–1906), American businessman
- Kathy High (born 1954), American interdisciplinary artist, curator and scholar
- Martha High (born 1945), American singer
- Monique Raphel High (born 1949), Franco-American author
- Philip E. High (1914–2006), English science fiction author
- Robert King High (1924–1967), American attorney and politician
- Steve High (fl. 1985–2011), American women's basketball coach
- William High (1786–1851), American politician and judge from Pennsylvania
