= Portrait of Four Children of the Wyatt Family =

Painting by John Everett Millais

- Artist: John Everett Millais
- Year: 1849
- Type: Oil on board
- Dimensions: 45.7 cm × 30.5 cm (18.0 in × 12.0 in)
- Location: Private collection: Andrew Lloyd Webber Collection

Portrait of Four Children of the Wyatt Family, also known as Portrait Of Four Children Of The Wyatt Family, The Girl Standing Being Mary Wyatt The Boy Beside Her Being James, is a portrait painting by the English artist John Everett Millais, painted in 1849. It is one of several portraits of the Wyatt family commissioned by James Wyatt senior.

== The painting ==
The painting shows four children, left to right a standing girl (Mary Wyatt), a standing boy (James Wyatt), and a child (probably a girl) sitting on an older girl's knee. Behind them is a wall hung with various paintings, part of the art collection of their grandfather, James Wyatt senior. Mary, the girl on the left, features in another Millais portrait commissioned by James Wyatt senior, James Wyatt and his Granddaughter Mary.

The painting was discovered in Tasmania, in the home of the descendent of one of the sitters. It was then sold at auction in London, by Phillips, for £62,000 on 13 December 1994 ("British & Victorian Oil Paintings, Watercolours & Drawings", Lot 79). At some time after this it came into the possession of Andrew Lloyd Webber.

In 2003 the painting was exhibited in the Pre-Raphaelite and Other Masters: The Andrew Lloyd Webber Collection exhibition at the Royal Academy in London.

== Other paintings of the Wyatt family by Millais ==
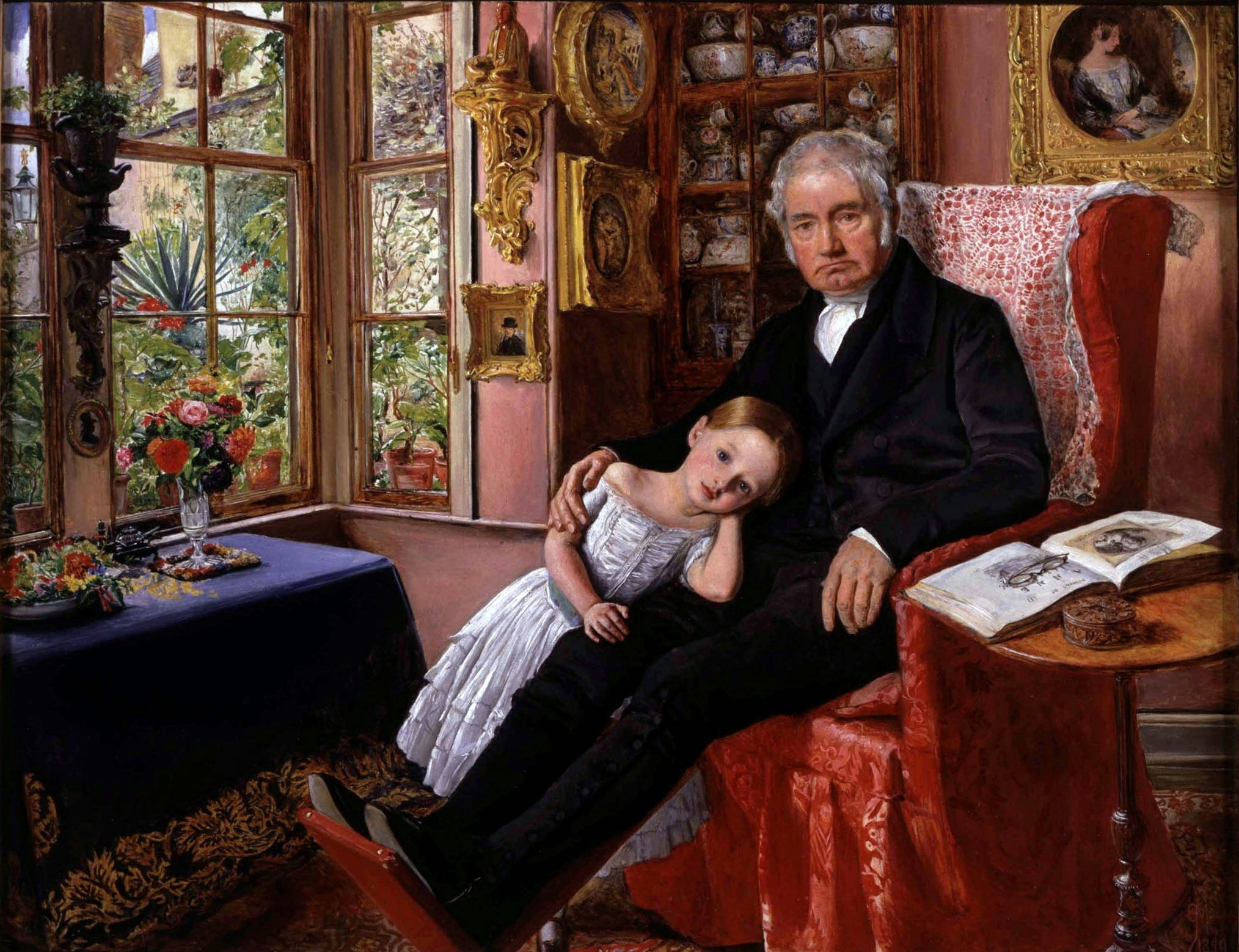
James Wyatt and his Granddaughter Mary, by John Everett Millais, commissioned by James Wyatt senior in 1849.

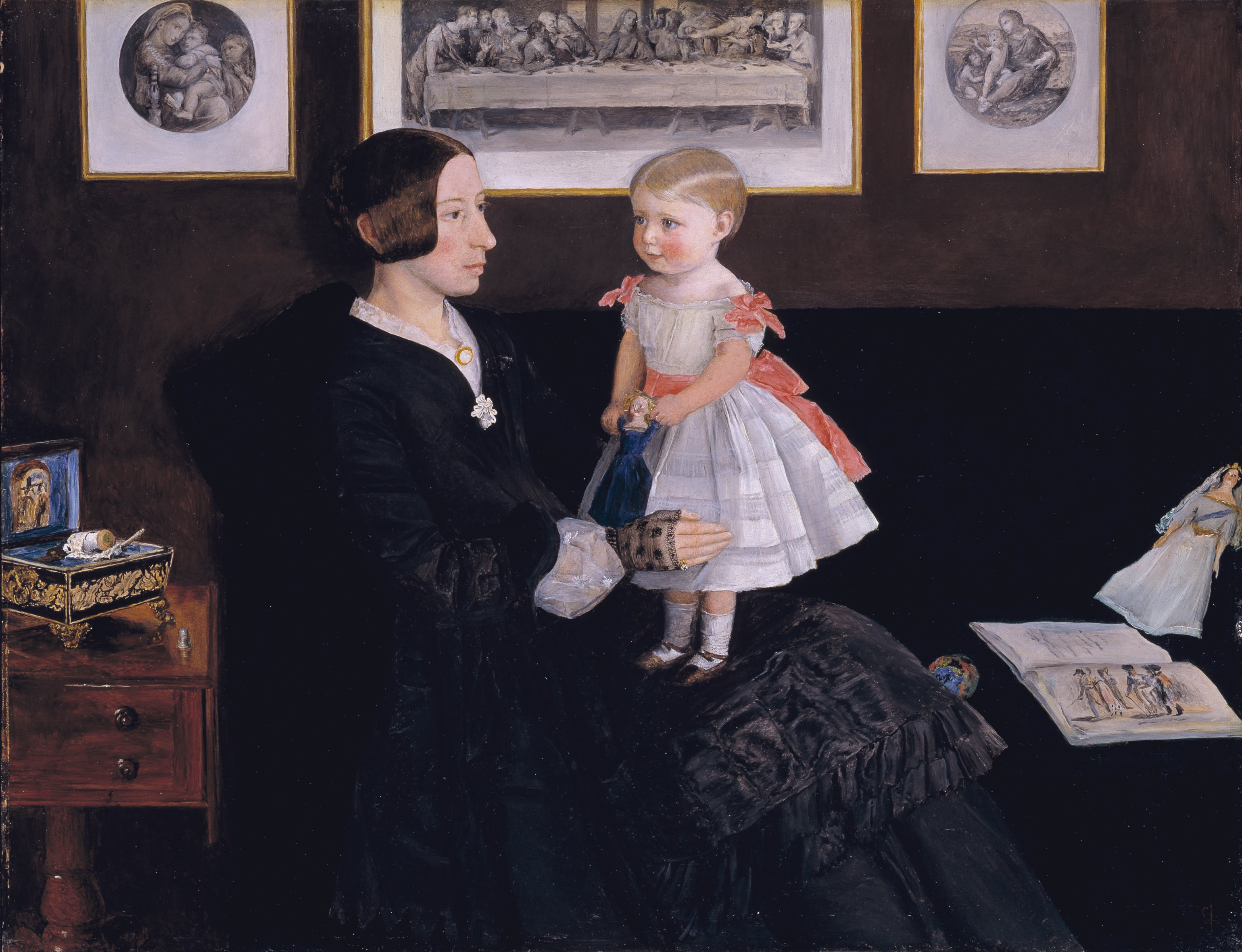
Mrs James Wyatt Jr and her Daughter Sarah, by John Everett Millais, commissioned by James Wyatt senior in 1849.

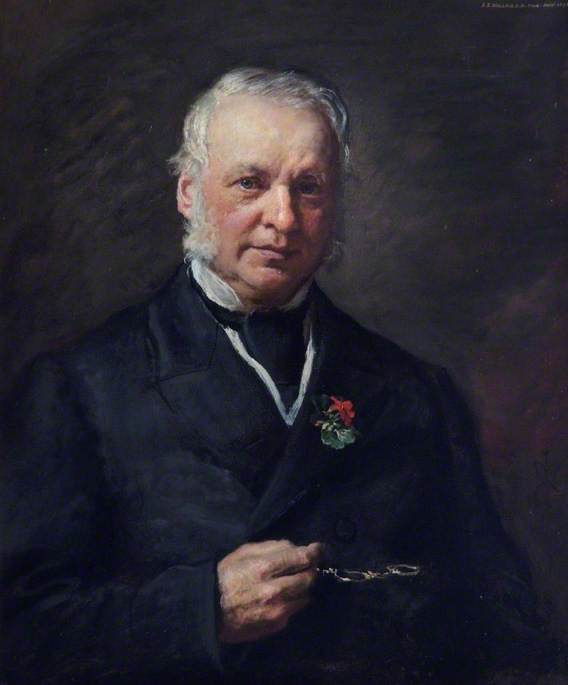
James Wyatt Junior (b. 1812), Aged 65, by John Everett Millais, 1875.

== See also ==
- List of paintings by John Everett Millais
