= Mrs James Wyatt Jr and her Daughter Sarah =

Painting by John Everett Millais

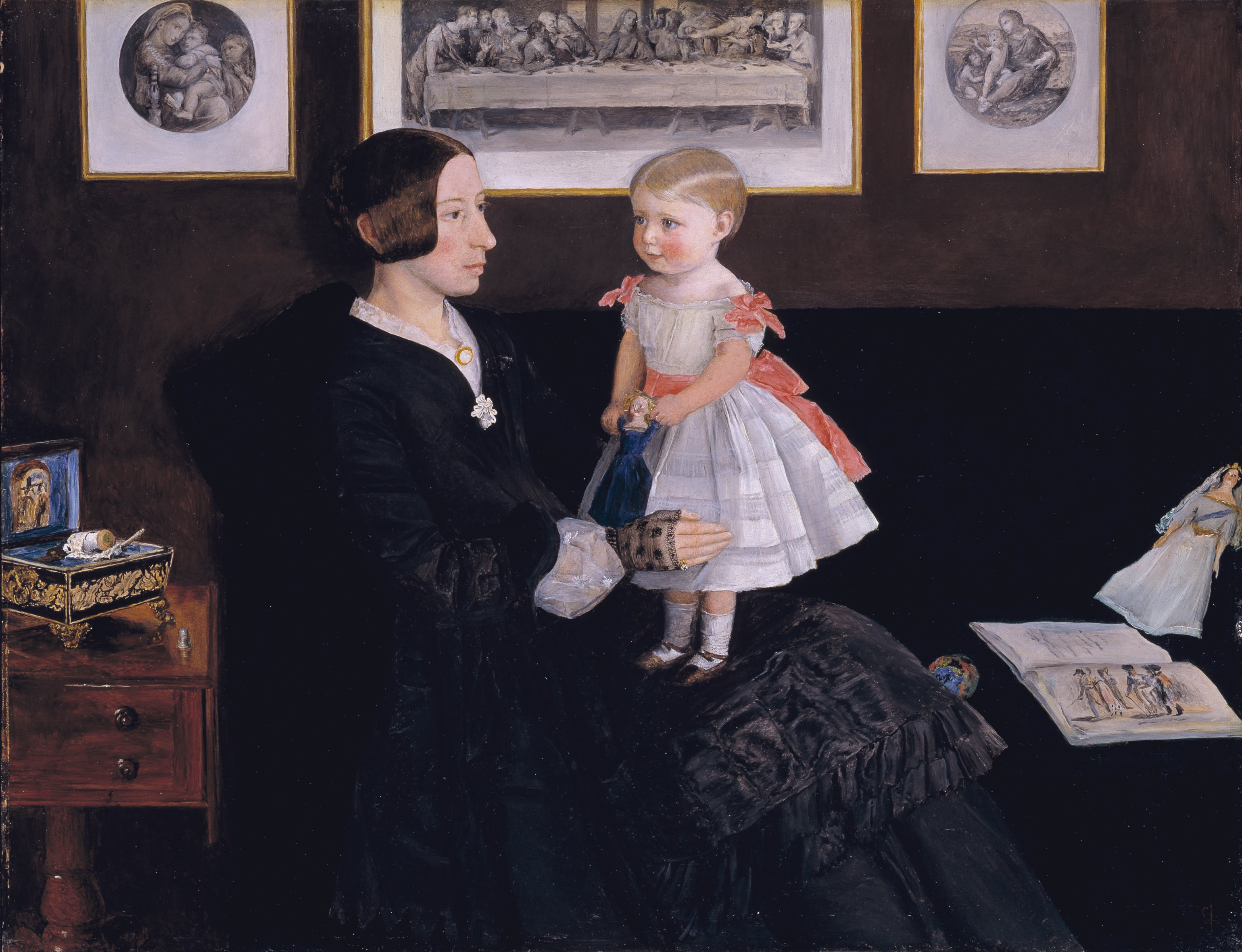
- Artist: John Everett Millais
- Year: c. 1850
- Type: Oil on panel
- Dimensions: 35.3 cm × 45.7 cm (13.9 in × 18.0 in)
- Location: Tate Gallery, London

Mrs James Wyatt Jr and her Daughter Sarah is a portrait by English artist John Everett Millais, painted c. 1850. It is a companion piece to Millais' 1849 James Wyatt and his Granddaughter Mary.

== The painting ==
James Wyatt had known Millais since at least 1846, when Millais made a watercolour portrait of Wyatt's granddaughter Mary (1845–1903, later Mrs James Standen). Wyatt commissioned Millais to paint James Wyatt and his Granddaughter Mary in 1849, and this painting of his daughter-in-law and granddaughter, Mrs James Wyatt Jr and her Daughter Sarah, was produced in c. 1850 as its pendant, a matching-sized pair. Millais had also painted four of the Wyatt children in Portrait of Four Children of the Wyatt Family in 1849.

The sitters are Eliza Wyatt (née Moorman) (1813–1895), wife of James Wyatt junior, and their daughter Sarah (17 January 1849 – 1916, later Mrs Thomas). There is some uncertainty over the date of the execution of the painting, but given the apparent age of Sarah in the portrait, a date of c. 1850 seems more likely that the other suggested date of 1853.

The painting was purchased by the Tate Gallery, London in 1984 from a descendant of the Wyatt family.

The painting has been exhibited at The Pre-Raphaelite Brotherhood exhibition, Birmingham City Art Gallery June–July 1947, no. 47; The Pre-Raphaelites exhibition, Whitechapel Art Gallery April–May 1948, no. 42; British Portraits exhibition, Royal Academy, London November 1956–March 1957, no. 439; Millais exhibition, Royal Academy, London January–March 1967 and Walker Art Gallery, Liverpool, March–April 1967, no. 21; The Pre-Raphaelites exhibition, Tate Gallery, March–May 1984 no. 29.

== Other paintings of the Wyatt family by Millais ==
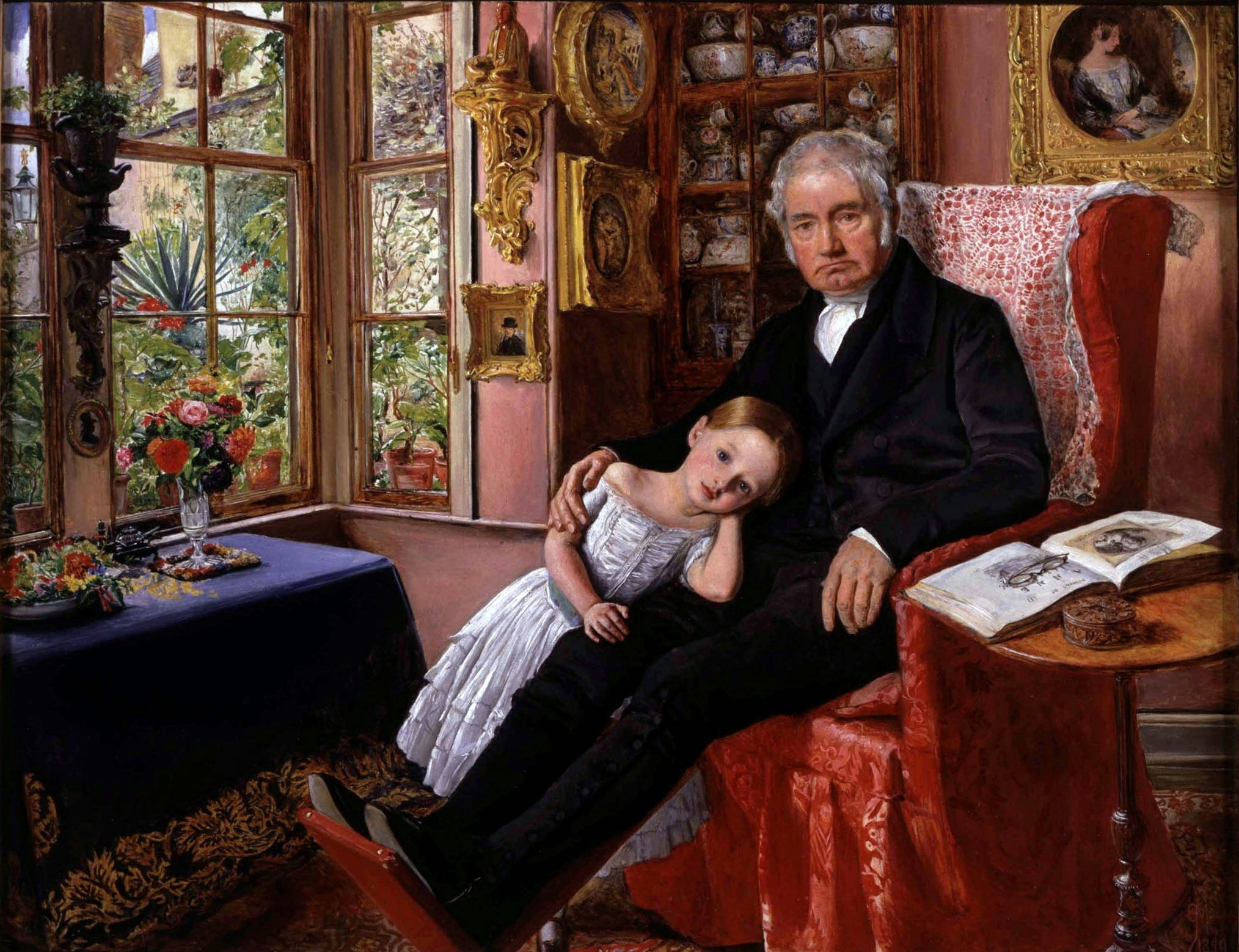
James Wyatt and his Granddaughter Mary, by John Everett Millais, commissioned by James Wyatt senior in 1849.

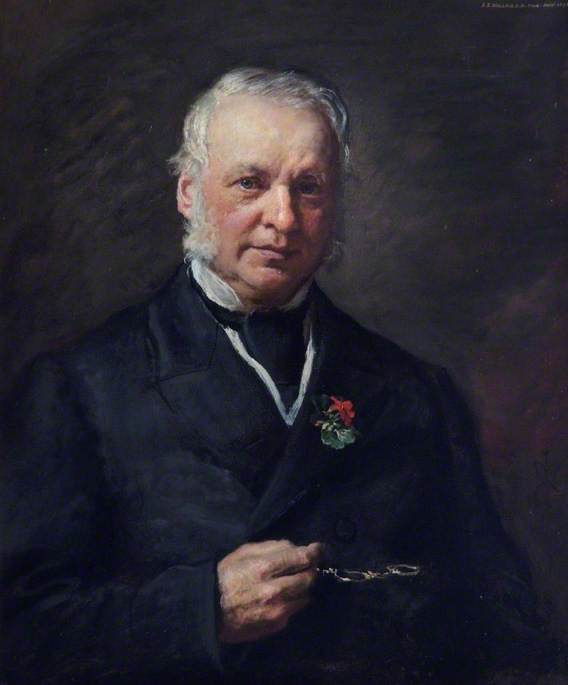
James Wyatt Junior (b. 1812), Aged 65, by John Everett Millais, 1875.

== See also ==
- List of paintings by John Everett Millais
