= Royal Headache =

Australian punk rock/garage band

- Origin: Sydney, New South Wales, Australia
- Genres: Punk rock, pub rock, garage punk, garage rock
- Years active: 2008–2013, 2014–2017
- Label: What's Your Rupture?
- Spinoffs: Shogun & The Sheets
- Past members: Tim "Shogun" Wall; Lawrence "Law" Hall; Gabrielle De Giorgio; Joseph "Joe" Sukit; Chris "Shortty" Shortt
- Website: Official site

Royal Headache was an Australian punk rock and garage band from Sydney. The band was formed in 2008 and was composed of Tim "Shogun" Wall (vocals), Lawrence "Law" Hall (guitar), Joseph "Joe" Sukit (bass), Chris "Shortty" Shortt (drums) and Gabrielle de Giorgio (keyboards, organ, percussion, vocals).

The band released two albums, Royal Headache (2011) and High (2015), both of which earned critical acclaim, and toured the US and Europe.

In June 2018, the band announced its dissolution via a post on their Facebook page.

== History ==
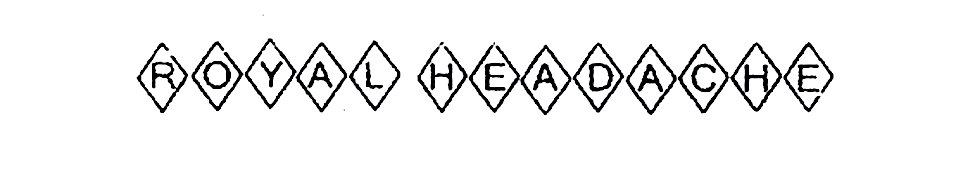
Logo

Royal Headache was born in 2008 in a boat shed in Putney, a suburb of Sydney, on the banks of the Parramatta River. It was here that Shortty and Law started jamming. "We just wanted to do something more stripped back," said Shortty of the band's beginnings. He also described it as "[a] back-to-basics rock and roll sensibility".

On a trip to Melbourne's Flip Out festival, they handed out copies of their rough instrumental demo hoping to find a singer, which piqued the interest of Shogun who had known Shortty from the Sydney punk and hardcore scene. Royal Headache's first show was in late January 2009, at a warehouse space called Maggotville.

Royal Headache's first single, "Eloise", was released in 2010. Prior to its release, the track was featured on Pitchfork, who said the song "recalls the fuzz and stomp of the Buzzcocks."

The group's 2011 self-titled debut album was a big word-of-mouth success for an independent Sydney band not backed by a major label subsidiary. The album earned rave reviews from critics, particularly for Shogun's vocals, which were often compared to soul singers. As one review said, Royal Headache "infus[ed] a vibrant, Motown-indebted charm to raucous punk rock." In 2012, the band toured the US in support of the album, selling out shows in Chicago and New York City. At the AIR Awards of 2012, they were nominated for three awards, winning Best Independent Album. That fall, they played several arena shows in Australia as the opening act for the Black Keys.

In 2013, the band released the single "Stand and Stare." Although seemingly poised for greater success, the band split abruptly shortly afterward when Shogun left the band. In an interview with Mess+Noise, he said "We were a pretty dysfunctional band, mostly because of me. I was drinking a lot and being an asshole, and I was never happy with anything." Despite breaking up, Shogun indicated that the band planned to finish recording their second album.

After not playing live for nearly a year and a half, the band reformed in November 2014 for a gig at Maggot Fest in Melbourne, and went on to play a handful of sold out shows. Keyboardist Gabrielle de Giorgio joined the band around this time and the band completed recording their second album.

Royal Headache was well known for their unpredictable live shows. During a performance at the Sydney Opera House, during the Vivid Sydney Festival in May 2015, the band was forced to end a performance early after 60 fans stormed the stage and were dispersed by police and security guards. An Opera House spokesperson said "Towards the end of the Royal Headache performance, some members of the audience made their way up on stage. Security attended and assisted patrons back to their seats. The performance resumed and the band completed their set." The incident resulted in widespread news coverage.

In August 2015, the group released their second studio album High. Vice Magazine said "In just under 30-minutes the record is short but full of joy and hopelessness with touches of sadness." In response to Vice Magazine's review, lead singer Shogun said "To be honest, they are all sad songs. There's no other reason to write a song. A song for me is someone trying to deal with a rift between themselves and reality. Singing a traditional love ballad to a bunch of Sydney punk kids is one of the most hardcore things you could do. Sing a pretty song to an Australian set of heteronormative people. Miss the mark and you're really in deep shit." High was again critically acclaimed, and the band toured the US and Europe during 2015 and 2016, including an appearance at the Primavera Sound festival in Barcelona.

Despite the success of High, Sukit and Shortt quit the band in late 2016. Wall, Law, and de Giorgio continued the band with two session musicians completing the rhythm section. This lineup played several shows in Australia, including a sold out show at the Factory Theatre in Sydney, and toured the US and Canada in July 2017. At these shows, the band played several new Motown influenced songs and were very well received - a Washington Post review of their show at The Black Cat said "On Friday night, Royal Headache was the greatest band in the world."

Those shows would prove to be the band's last - their final gig was on July 21, 2017 at the FYF Festival in Los Angeles. In June 2018, the band announced its dissolution via a post on their Facebook page, simply saying: "2008-2017". Shogun later described the group's twilight as an "emotional holocaust," and said he does not "talk to anyone from that period anymore." In 2018, he commenced work with a new band called Shogun & The Sheets. Sukit played briefly with the Sydney garage punk group Bed Wettin' Bad Boys; Hall, Shortt, and de Giorgio have left the music industry.

After several years of complete inactivity following the breakup, Royal Headache released a live album in June 2024. Entitled Live in America, the album consists of a full set performed live on WFMU in June 2012, and most of an August 2015 concert at Chicago's Empty Bottle. The songs "So Low" and "Teardrops" (the latter a Womack and Womack cover) are on the live album and were not previously released. Shogun stated in a post on his Instagram page that the band would not be reuniting.

== Discography ==
=== Studio and live albums ===
Title	Details
Royal Headache	Released: 2011; Label: R.I.P Society (RIP021) What's Your Rupture? (WYR0212); Format: CD, LP digital download
High	Released: 21 August 2015; Label: Distant & Vague (DAV001) What's Your Rupture? (WYR0315); Format: CD, LP digital download
Live in America	Released: 21 June 2024; Label: What's Your Rupture; Format: CD, LP digital download

=== Extended plays ===
Title	Details
Royal Headache	Released: 2010; Label: R.I.P Society (RIP006); Format: 7" LP, digital download
Launch Show Tape	Released: 2010; Label: Royal Headache; Format: cassette
2010 Winter Tour	Released: 2010; Label: Royal Headache; Format: cassette

=== Singles ===
==== As lead artist ====
Year	Title	Album
2010	"Eloise"	Royal Headache (EP)
2011	"Surprise"	Royal Headache
2013	"Stand and Stare"/"Give it All to Me"	non album single
2015	"Carolina"	High

== Awards and nominations ==
=== AIR Awards ===
The Australian Independent Record Awards (commonly known informally as AIR Awards) is an annual awards night to recognise, promote and celebrate the success of Australia's Independent Music sector.

Year	Nominee / work	Award	Result
2012	Royal Headache (themselves)	Best Independent Artist	Nominated
2012	Royal Headache (themselves)	Breakthrough Independent Artist	Nominated
2012	Royal Headache	Best Independent Album	Won

=== Australian Music Prize ===
The Australian Music Prize (the AMP) is an annual award of $30,000 given to an Australian band or solo artist in recognition of the merit of an album released during the year of award. The commenced in 2005.

Year	Nominee / work	Award	Result
2015	High	Australian Music Prize	Nominated

=== EG Awards / Music Victoria Awards ===
The EG Awards (known as Music Victoria Awards since 2013) are an annual awards night celebrating Victorian music. They commenced in 2006.

Year	Nominee / work	Award	Result
2011	Royal Headache	Best New Talent	Won
