= Cymon and Iphigenia (Millais) =

Painting by John Everett Millais

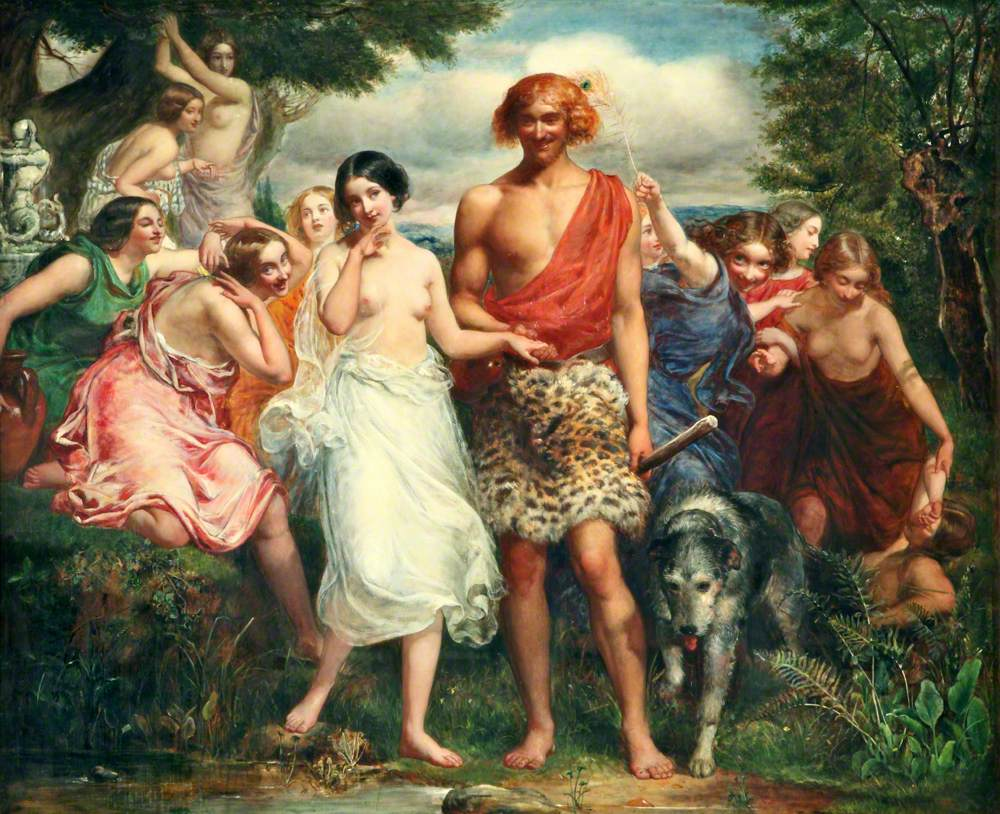
- Artist: John Everett Millais
- Year: 1847–48
- Type: Oil on canvas, history painting
- Dimensions: 114.3 cm × 147.3 cm (45.0 in × 58.0 in)
- Location: Lady Lever Art Gallery, Merseyside

Cymon and Iphigenia is an 1847–48 oil painting by the British artist John Everett Millais. Drawn from the poetry of John Dryden which was itself inspired the Renaissance work The Decameron by Giovanni Boccaccio, it shows the beautiful Iphigenia encountering the young nobleman Cymon in the woods.

The painting was made when Millais was eighteen and produced shortly before he joined the Pre-Raphaelite Brotherhood although William Holman Hunt assisted with the drapery. It is stylistically close to the work of William Etty who was well-known for his nude art during the Regency and early Victorian era. Millais submitted the work to the Royal Academy Exhibition of 1848 held at the National Gallery, but it was rejected by the hanging committee. Within a year Millais came to regret the stylistic choice of the painting. A self-conscious Millais did not submit another nude scene until The Knight Errant in 1870.

The painting was bought by Oxford dealer James Wyatt from Millais in 1849 for £60. The painting hung in a special Winter Exhibition at the Royal Academy, London, held between January and March 1898, which featured many collected works of the late Millais. At the time it was the property of J. H. Standen, Esq. Today the painting is in the collection of the Lady Lever Art Gallery, having been allocated to the gallery after being accepted in lieu of tax from the estate of Philip Lever, 3rd Viscount Leverhulme by the government in 2004.

== See also ==
- List of paintings by John Everett Millais
- Cymon and Iphigenia, an 1884 painting by Frederic Leighton

== Bibliography ==
- Hartley, Lucy. Physiognomy and the Meaning of Expression in Nineteenth-Century Culture. Cambridge University Press, 2005.
- Smith, Alison. The Victorian Nude: Sexuality, Morality and Art. Manchester University Press, 1996.
