= The Death of Romeo and Juliet =

Painting by John Everett Millais

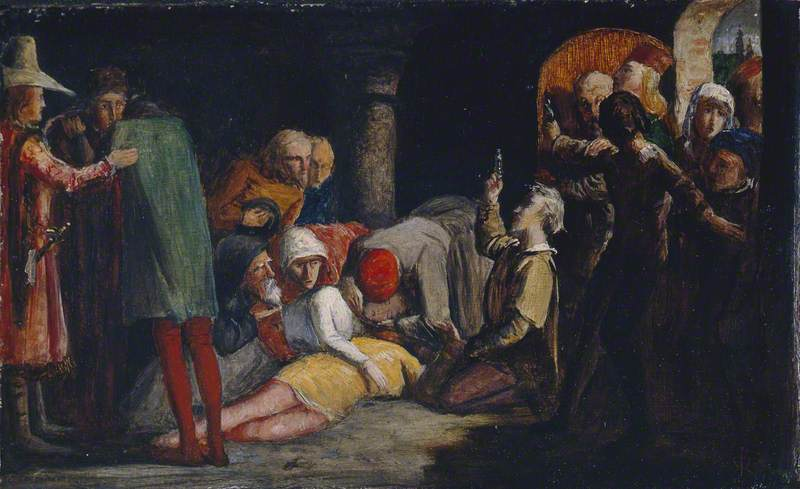
- Artist: John Everett Millais
- Year: c. 1848
- Type: Oil on millboard
- Dimensions: 16.1 cm × 26.9 cm (6.3 in × 10.6 in)
- Location: Manchester Art Gallery, Manchester

The Death of Romeo and Juliet is an early oil painting by English artist John Everett Millais, painted in circa 1848.

== The painting ==
The painting, oil on millboard, shows a scene from Act V, Scene 4 of William Shakespeare's Romeo and Juliet, where the lovers are found dead in the Capulet family tomb. The scene is lit by light coming from the open door at the top right of the image. It signed with Millais' monogram JEM at the bottom right corner.

The painting was owned by Oxford art dealer and patron of Millais, James Wyatt at the time of Wyatt's death in 1853.

The painting was given to Manchester Art Gallery in 1941 as part of the George Beatson Blair bequest. It has been exhibited at the 1974 Pre-Raphaelite Paintings: The collection of paintings, drawings and sculpture by the Pre-Raphaelites and their followers exhibition at Manchester Art Gallery and in the 1992–1993 Shakespeare in Western Art, c. 1750–c. 1910 exhibition at the Isetan Gallery, Tokyo.

== See also ==
- List of paintings by John Everett Millais
