= Taking Me Higher =

Taking Me Higher may refer to:

- "Taking Me Higher", by Barclay James Harvest from Gone to Earth 1977
- "Taking Me Higher", by Illenium from Awake 2017

== See also ==
- Take Me Higher (disambiguation)
