= High Street Historic District (Wilmington, Massachusetts) =

Historic district in Massachusetts, United States

- U.S. National Register of Historic Places
- U.S. Historic district
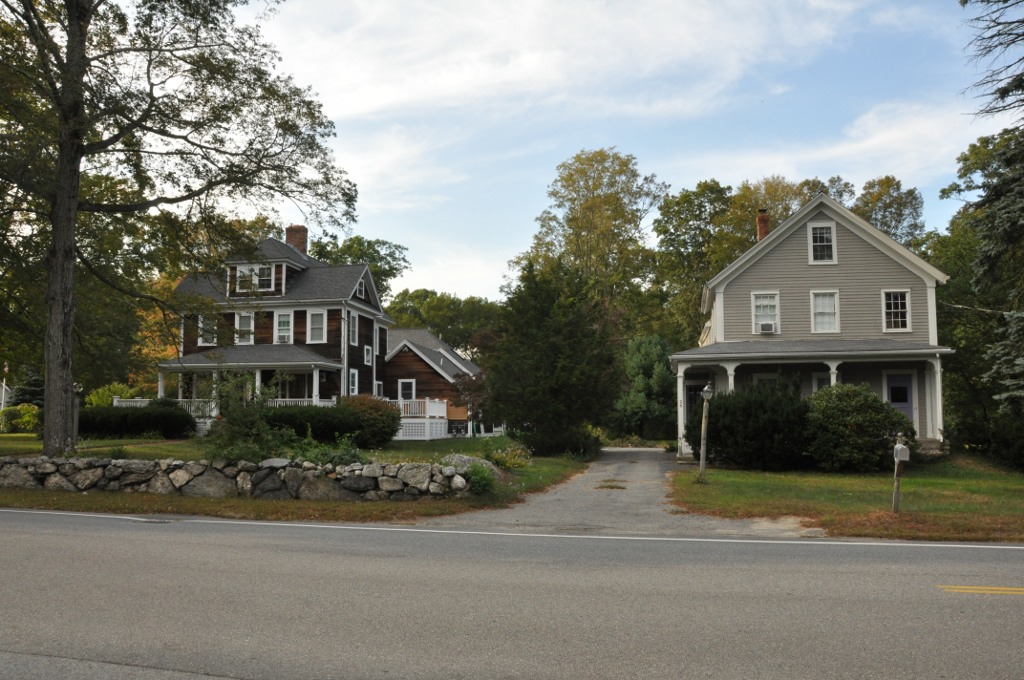
- 24 and 26 High Street

- Location within Massachusetts Location within the United States
- Location: Wilmington, Massachusetts
- Coordinates: 42°34′21″N 71°9′11″W
- Area: 16.5 acres (6.7 ha)
- Architect: Woodward, Sylvester; Fall, George
- Architectural style: Greek Revival, Queen Anne
- NRHP reference No.: 03001177
- Added to NRHP: November 21, 2003

The High Street Historic District in Wilmington, Massachusetts is a residential historic district along High Street. The district runs east from High Street's junction with Salem Street (Massachusetts Route 62) to a sharp bend in the road where it meets the right-of-way for Interstate 93. Of the 17 contributing properties, all but four are located on the north side of the road (between numbers 8 and 72); the rest are on the south side (numbers 31, 47, 57 and 67). It represents a cluster of high quality houses built mainly in the second half of the 19th century, although there is one contributing property (a Cape style house at 58 High Street) built in 1942. The styling of these houses is diverse, with all of the popular revival styles of the period represented. Houses built in the 20th century are predominantly Colonial Revival or Craftsman/Bungalow in style.

The district was listed on the National Register of Historic Places in 2003.

== See also ==
- National Register of Historic Places listings in Middlesex County, Massachusetts
