= Take Me Higher (disambiguation) =

Take Me Higher is a studio album by American singer Diana Ross.

Take Me Higher may also refer to:

- "Take Me Higher" (song), a 1995 single by Diana Ross
- "Take Me Higher", song by Inna
- "Take Me Higher!!", song by Band-Maid from Just Bring It
- "Take Me Higher", single by Robin Thicke
- "Take Me Higher", song by Jars of Clay from the album Good Monsters
- "Take Me Higher", song by Japanese boy band V6 for the tokusatsu series, Ultraman Tiga

== See also ==
- Takes Me Higher, song by J. Williams
- Take Me High, a 1973 British film starring Cliff Richard
- Taking Me Higher (disambiguation)
