= High Road =

High Road or The High Road may refer to:

== Film and television ==
- High Road (film), a 2012 comedy by Matt Walsh
- The Lady of Scandal, a 1930 American pre-Code film, also known as The High Road
- The High Road (1915 film), a lost silent film
- Take the High Road or High Road, a soap opera
- "The High Road" (Person of Interest), an episode of Person of Interest
- John Gunther's High Road, a 1959–1960 TV series hosted by John Gunther

== Literature ==
- The High Road (play), a 1927 comedy play by Frederick Lonsdale
- The High Road (novel), a 1988 novel by Edna O'Brien
- High Roads (comics), a comic book series created by Scott Lobdell and Leinil Francis Yu

== Music ==
- Kilburn and the High Roads, a band of Ian Dury

=== Albums ===
- High Road (The Grapes of Wrath album) (2013)
- The High Road (JoJo album), 2006
- The High Road (Kane Brown album), 2025
- The High Road (Roxy Music album), 1983
- High Road (Kesha album) (2020)
- High Road (Night Ranger album) (2014) or its title track
- The High Road (EP), a 1983 EP by Roxy Music
- The High Road, an album by Mudmen

=== Songs ===
- "The High Road" (Broken Bells song) (2009)
- "High Road" (Koe Wetzel song) (2024)
- "High Road" (Mastodon song) (2014)
- "The High Road" (Three Days Grace song) (2013)
- "High Road" (Zach Bryan song) (2024)
- "High Road", a song by Cults from Static
- "High Road", a song by Fort Minor from The Rising Tied
- "High Road", a song by Kelly Clarkson from Chemistry
- "The High Road", a 1966 song by Lil' Bob and the Lollipops

== Places ==
- High Road, Perth
- Chiswick High Road
- Kilburn High Road
- Streatham High Road
- Tottenham High Road

== See also ==
- "The Bonnie Banks o' Loch Lomond"
- High Street (disambiguation)
- Team High Road and Team High Road Women professional cycling teams
