= High Street Historic District =

High Street Historic District may refer to:

in the United States

- High Street Historic District (Hartford, Connecticut), listed on the NRHP in Connecticut
- High Street Historic District (Ipswich, Massachusetts), listed on the NRHP in Massachusetts
- High Street Historic District (Wilmington, Massachusetts), listed on the NRHP in Massachusetts
- High Street Historic District (Camden, Maine), listed on the NRHP in Maine
- High Street Historic District (Burlington, New Jersey), listed on the NRHP in New Jersey
- High Street Historic District (Pottstown, Pennsylvania), listed on the NRHP in Pennsylvania
