= William High =

American politician and judge (1786–1851)

Member of the Pennsylvania House of Representatives from the Berks County district
- In office 1832–1832
- Preceded by: John Potteiger
- Succeeded by: Peter Klein Jr.

Personal details
- Born: January 14, 1786
- Died: March 29, 1851 (aged 65)
- Spouse(s): Catherine Van Reed (died 1822) Catherine Van Reed
- Children: 1
- Occupation: Politician; judge; militiaman

William High (January 14, 1786 – March 29, 1851) was an American politician and judge from Pennsylvania.

== Early life ==
William High was born on January 14, 1786, to Sarah (née Hottenstein) and Isaac High. His father was a farmer. His mother later married Peter Nagle.

== Career ==
In 1809, High was a member of the Reading Cavalry. He was elected as captain of the cavalry in 1816 and was elected and served for 15 years as brigadier general of the Pennsylvania State Militia. He served as county commissioner of Berks County from 1816 to 1819.

High served as a member of the Pennsylvania House of Representatives, representing Berks County, in 1832. In 1838, he was one of five delegates from Berks County to the Pennsylvania Constitutional Convention. He served as associate judge of Berks County from 1846 to 1851.

== Personal life ==
High married Catherine Van Reed, daughter of John Van Reed. His wife died in 1822. They had one son, Ezra. He married a second time, to Catherine Van Reed, daughter of Jacob Van Reed.

High died on March 29, 1851.
