= High Street station =

High Street station may refer to:

== Australia ==
- High Street railway station, New South Wales in Maitland

== United States ==
- High Street (IND Eighth Avenue Line) on the New York City Subway

== United Kingdom ==
- High Street (Glasgow) railway station in Glasgow, Scotland
- Clapham High Street railway station in London, England
- High Street Kensington tube station in London, England
- Shoreditch High Street railway station in London, England
- High Street tram stop, a Metrolink station in Manchester, England
- Swansea railway station (formerly called Swansea High Street) in Swansea, Wales
- Watford High Street railway station in Watford, England
