= High Street, Oxford (painting) =

Painting by J. M. W. Turner

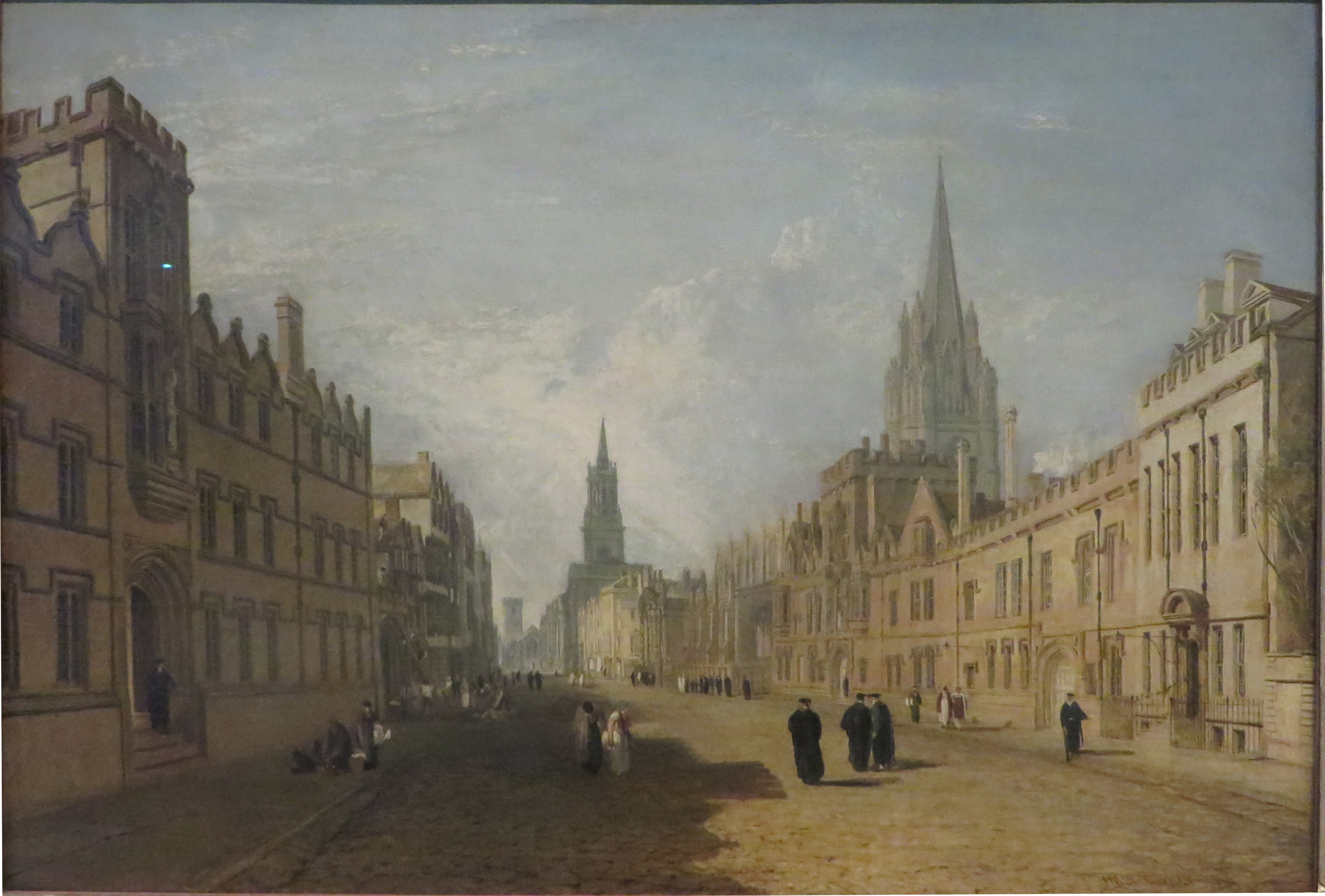
- Artist: J. M. W. Turner
- Year: 1810
- Medium: Oil on canvas
- Dimensions: 68.5 cm × 100.3 cm (27.0 in × 39.5 in)
- Location: Ashmolean Museum; Oxford
- Accession: WA2016.48
- Website: collections.ashmolean.org/object/384480

High Street, Oxford is an oil painting by J. M. W. Turner that was exhibited in 1810.

The painting shows a view looking west along the High Street, a major street in central Oxford, England, with University College on the left, All Souls College on the right, and the spires of All Saints Church (now the library of Lincoln College, centre) and St Mary's Church (the University church, centre right). In the distance is the tower of St Martin's Church (marking the centre of Oxford, now known as Carfax Tower since the rest of the church has been demolished).

Originally, the painting was commissioned by James Wyatt. He intended to have it engraved and sold as a print at his shop, located at 115 High Street in Oxford.

The painting is now exhibited at the Ashmolean Museum in Oxford. In 2015, there was a campaign to raise money for the purchase of the picture (estimated value £3.5 million) since previously it was on long-term loan to the museum from a private collection since 1997. It was left to the nation in lieu of death duties. The painting was acquired using grants of £550,000 from the UK Heritage Lottery Fund, £220,000 from the UK Art Fund, and £30,000 from the Friends and Patrons of the Ashmolean Museum.

Thomas Malton, who taught Turner, also painted a similar painting.

== Similar views ==
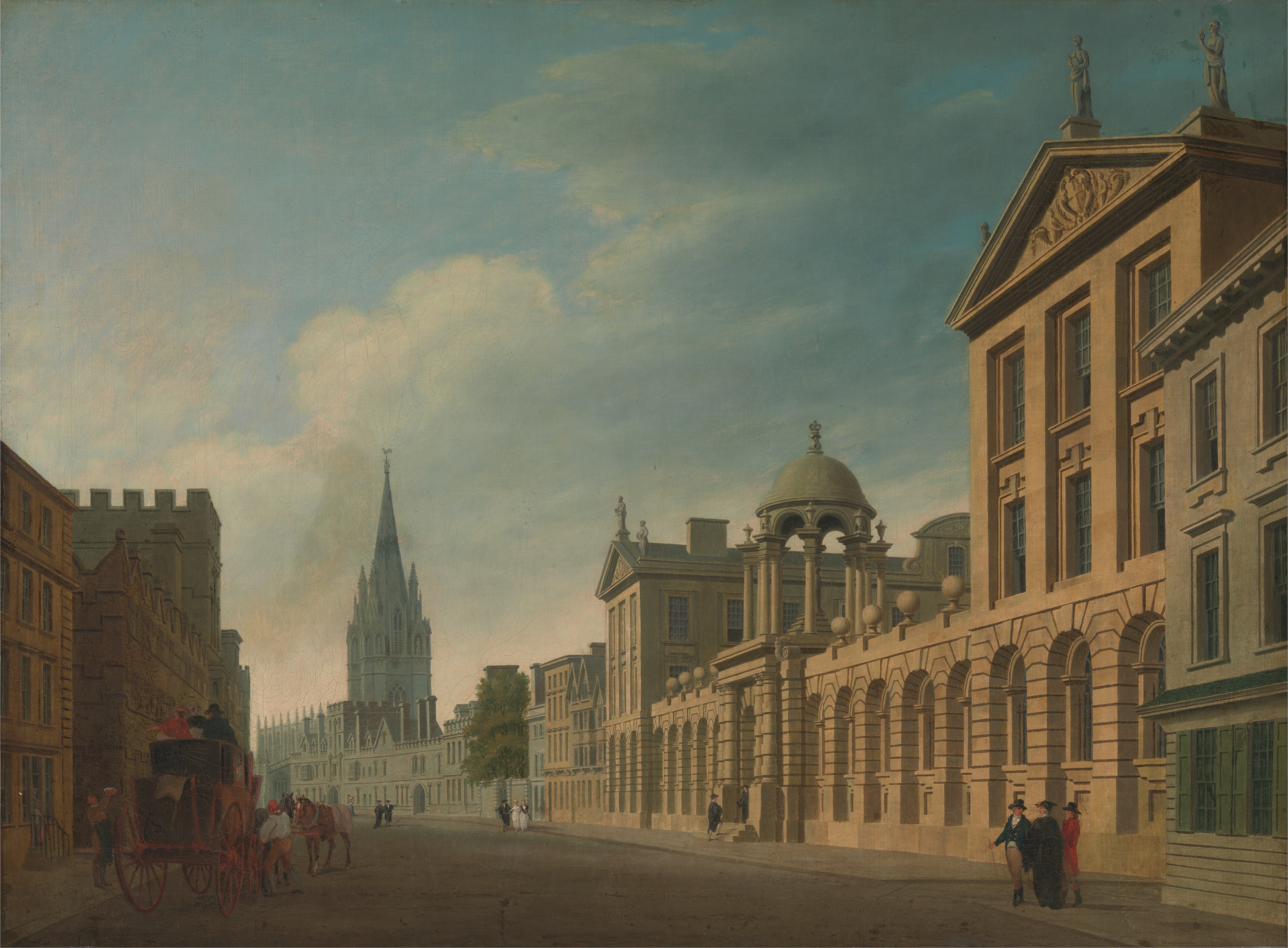
High Street by the 18th-century painter Thomas Malton.

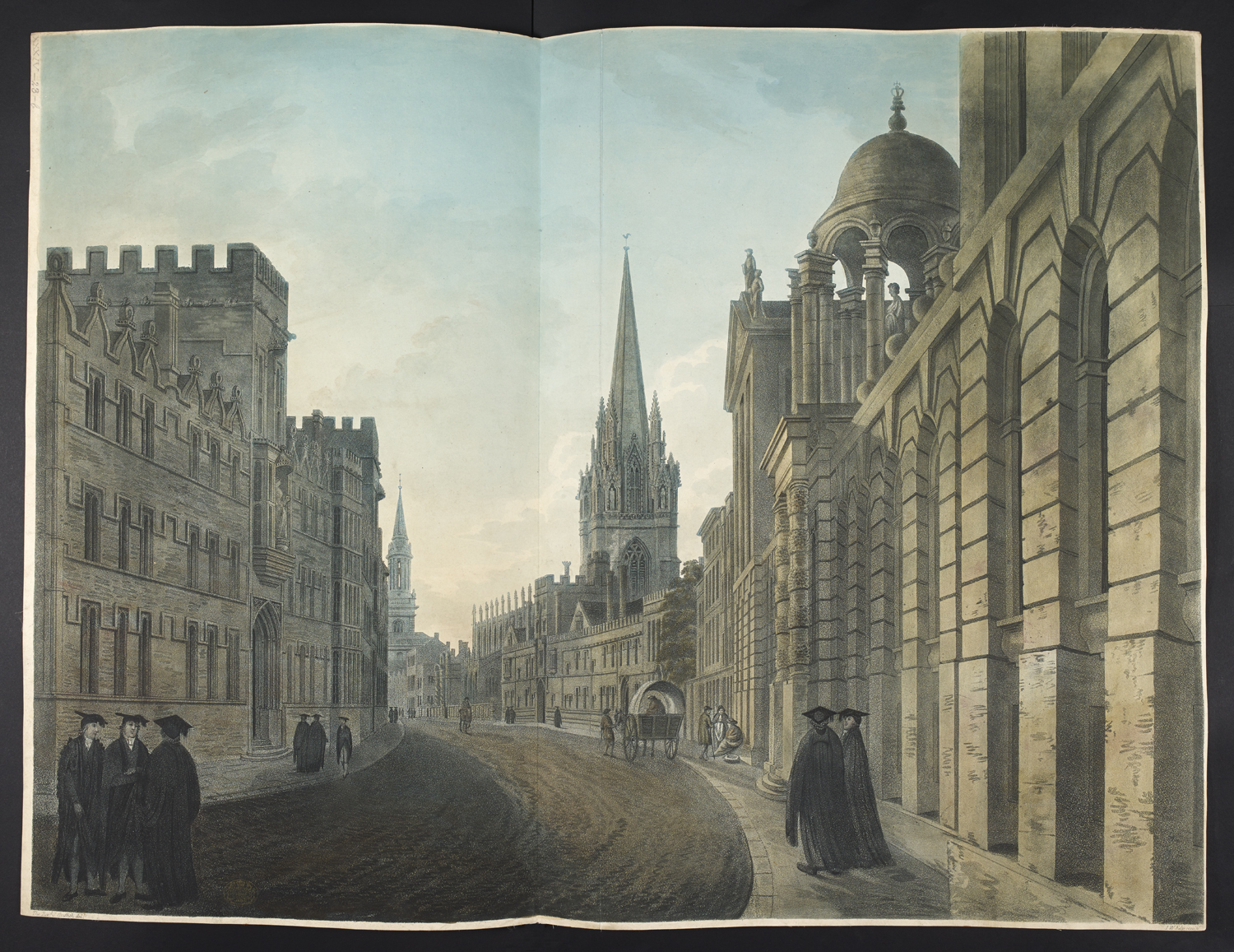
A similar view to the painting in 1803.

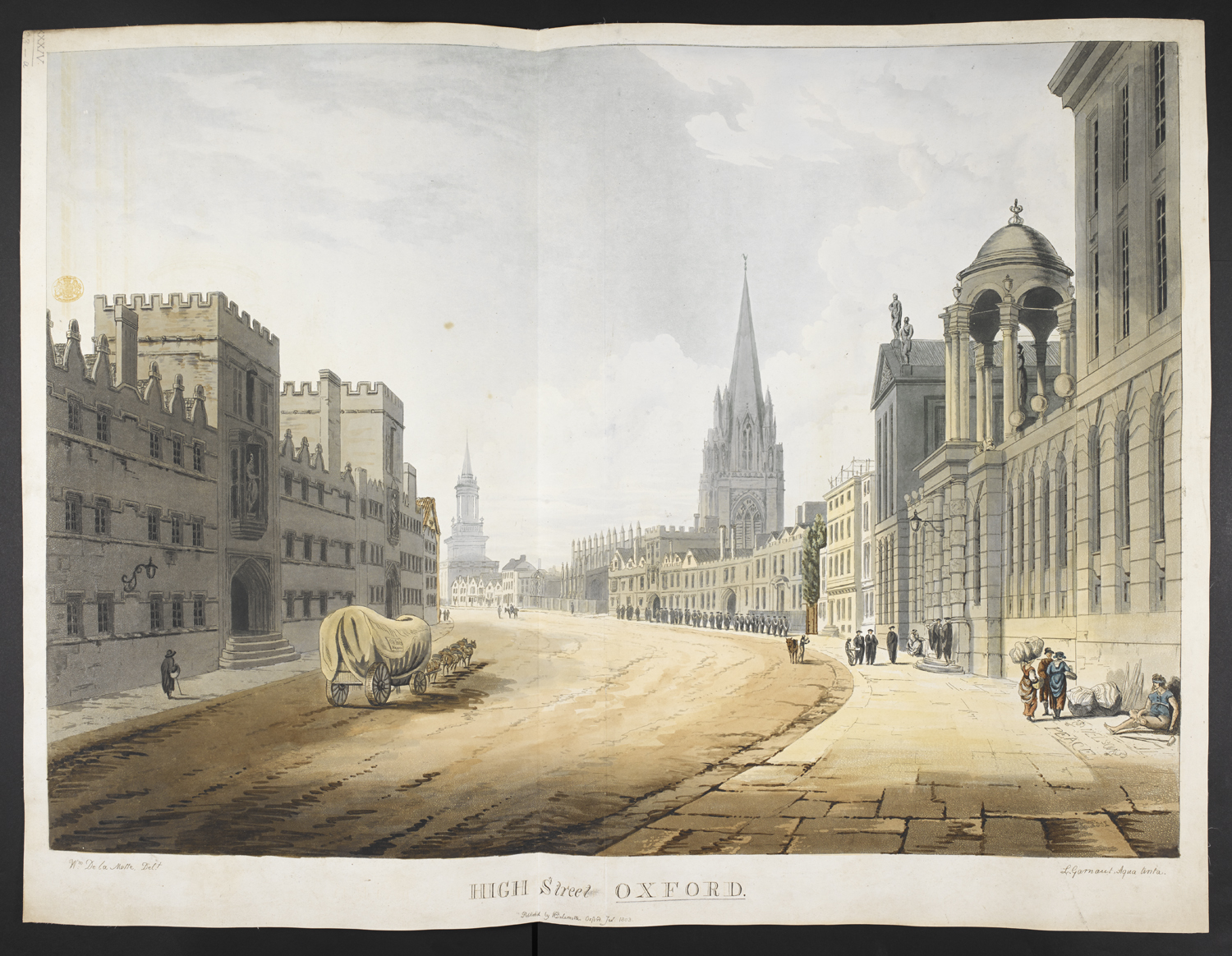
View in 1820.

View in 1873.

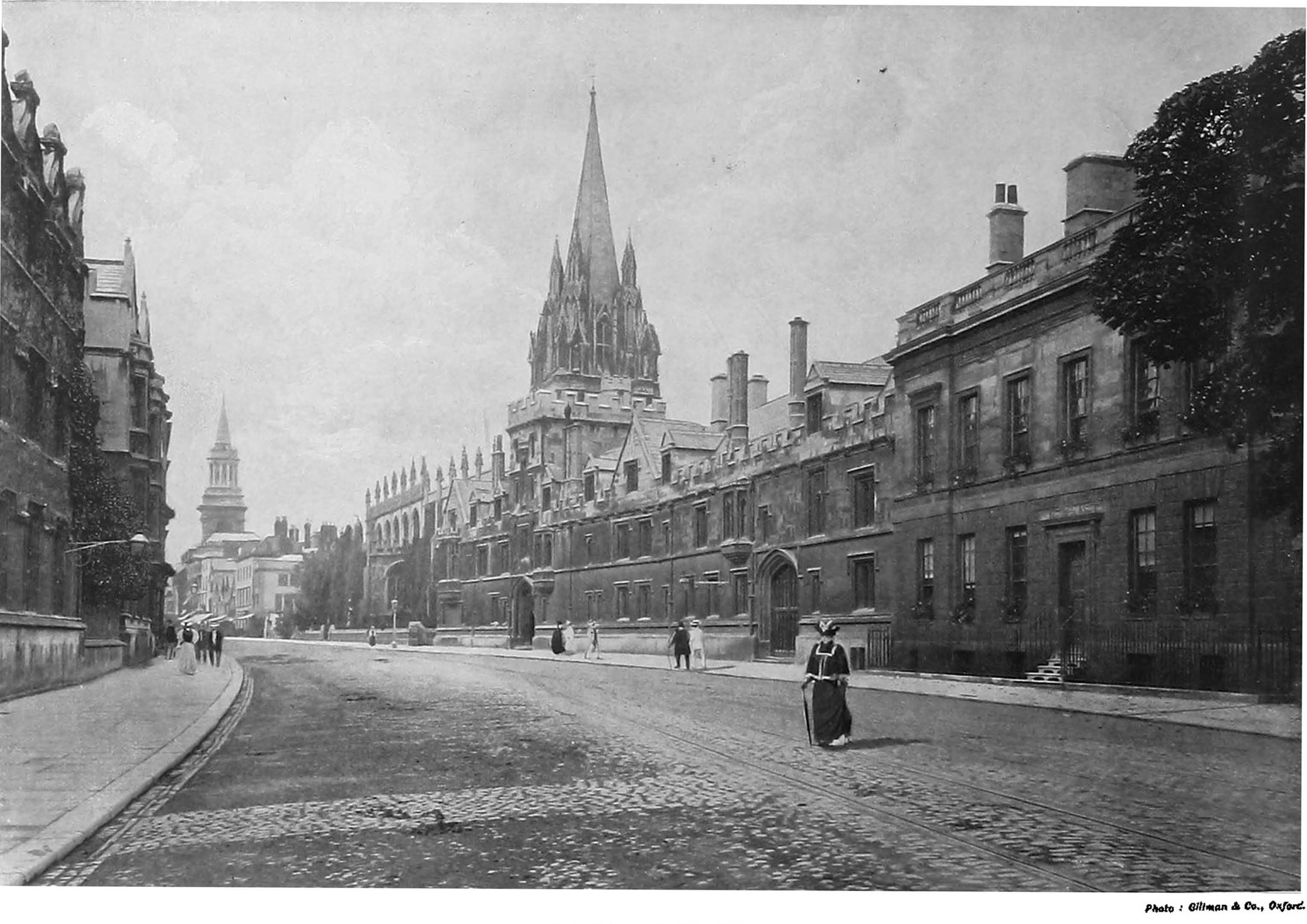
A photographic view in the late 1890s.

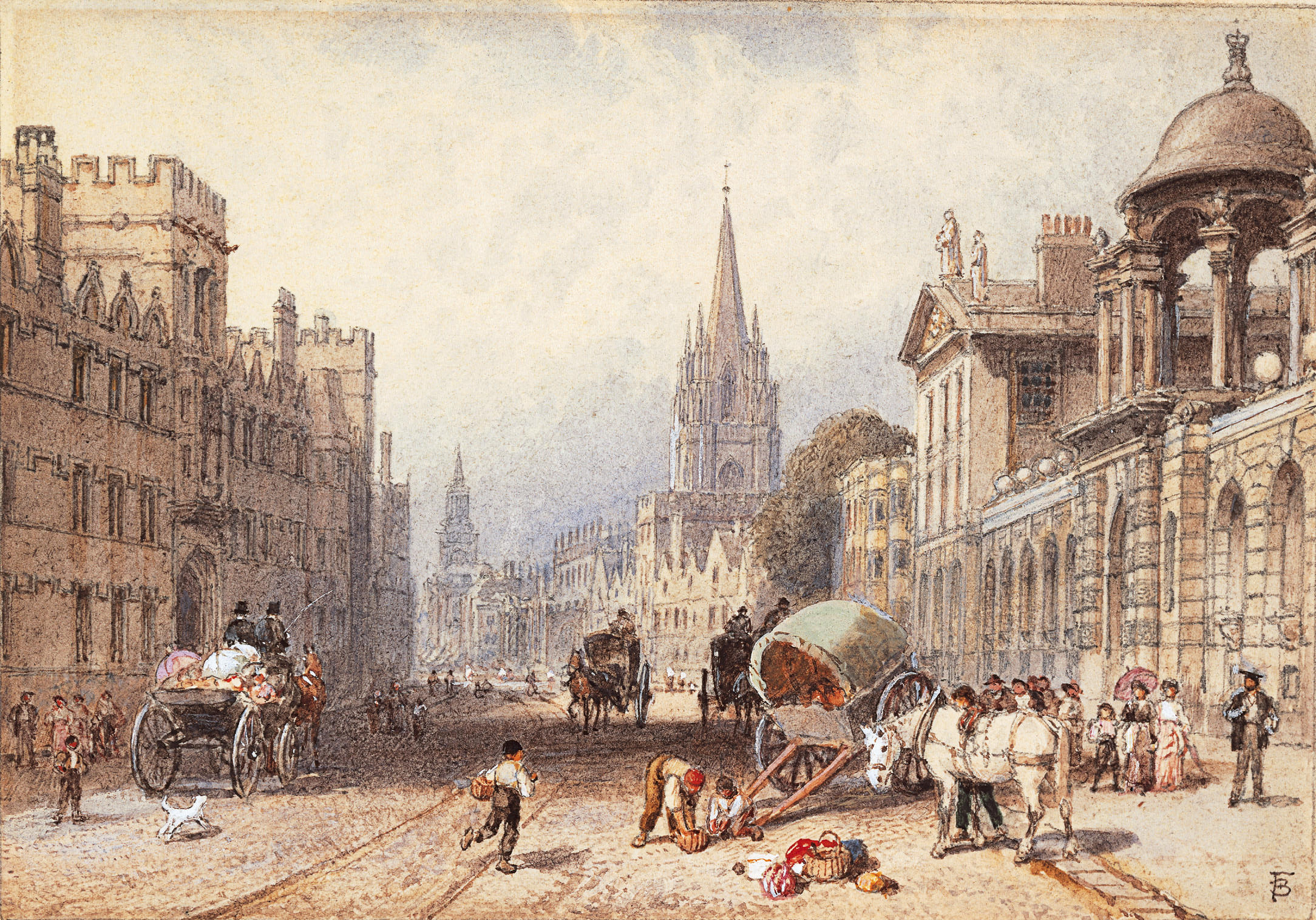
View in 1899 by Myles Birket Foster (1825–1899).

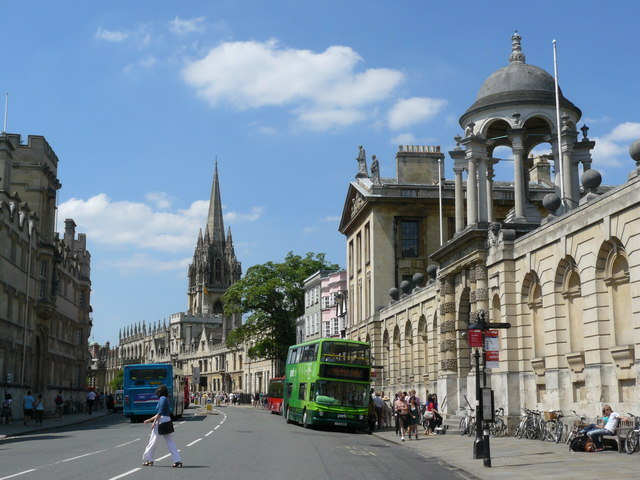
Modern photographic view.

== See also ==
- List of paintings by J. M. W. Turner
