= Highly Creek =

Stream in northwest Missouri, U.S.

Highly Creek Buck Branch
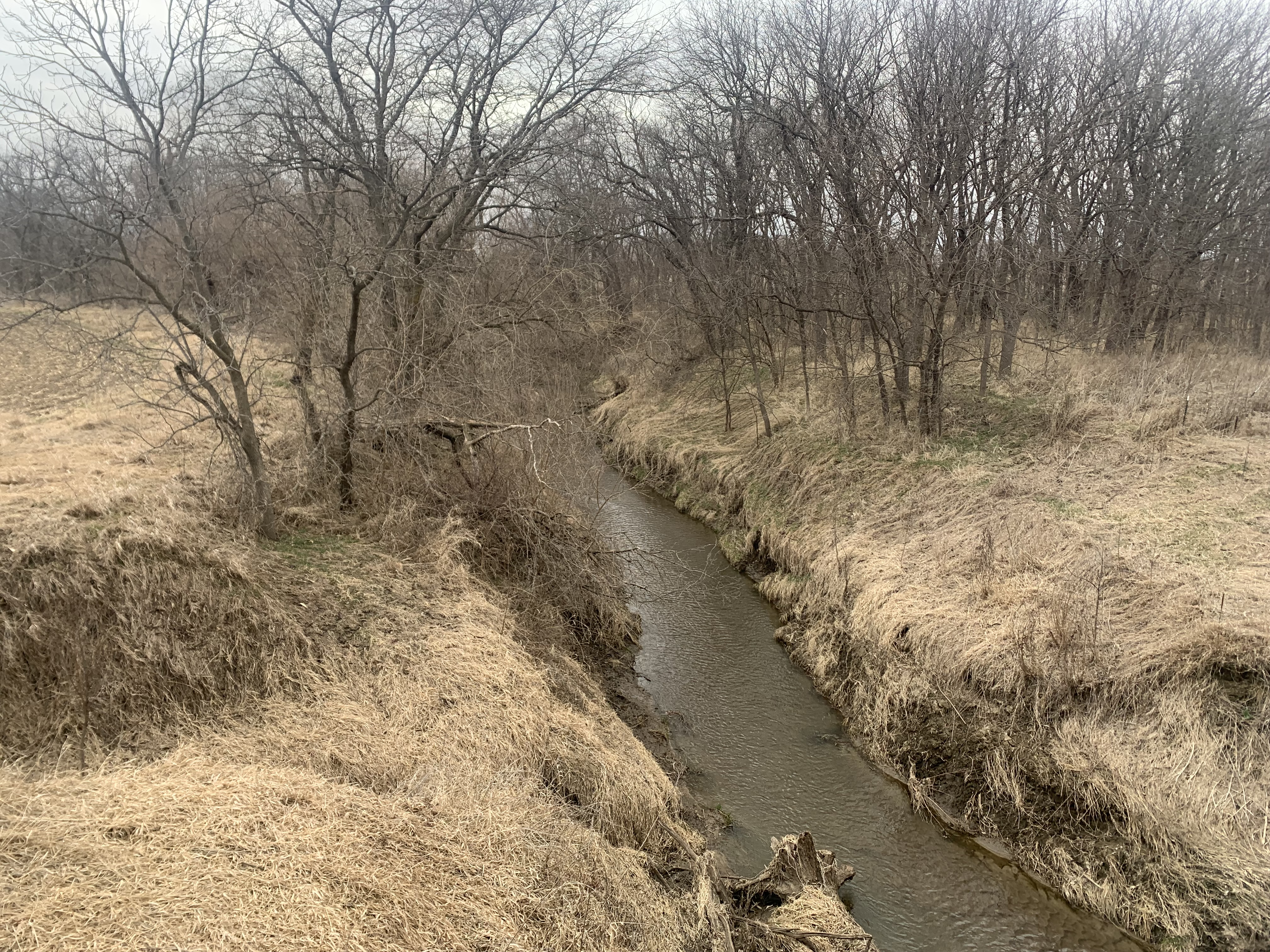
- Highly Creek at Route 113 bridge in Clay Township

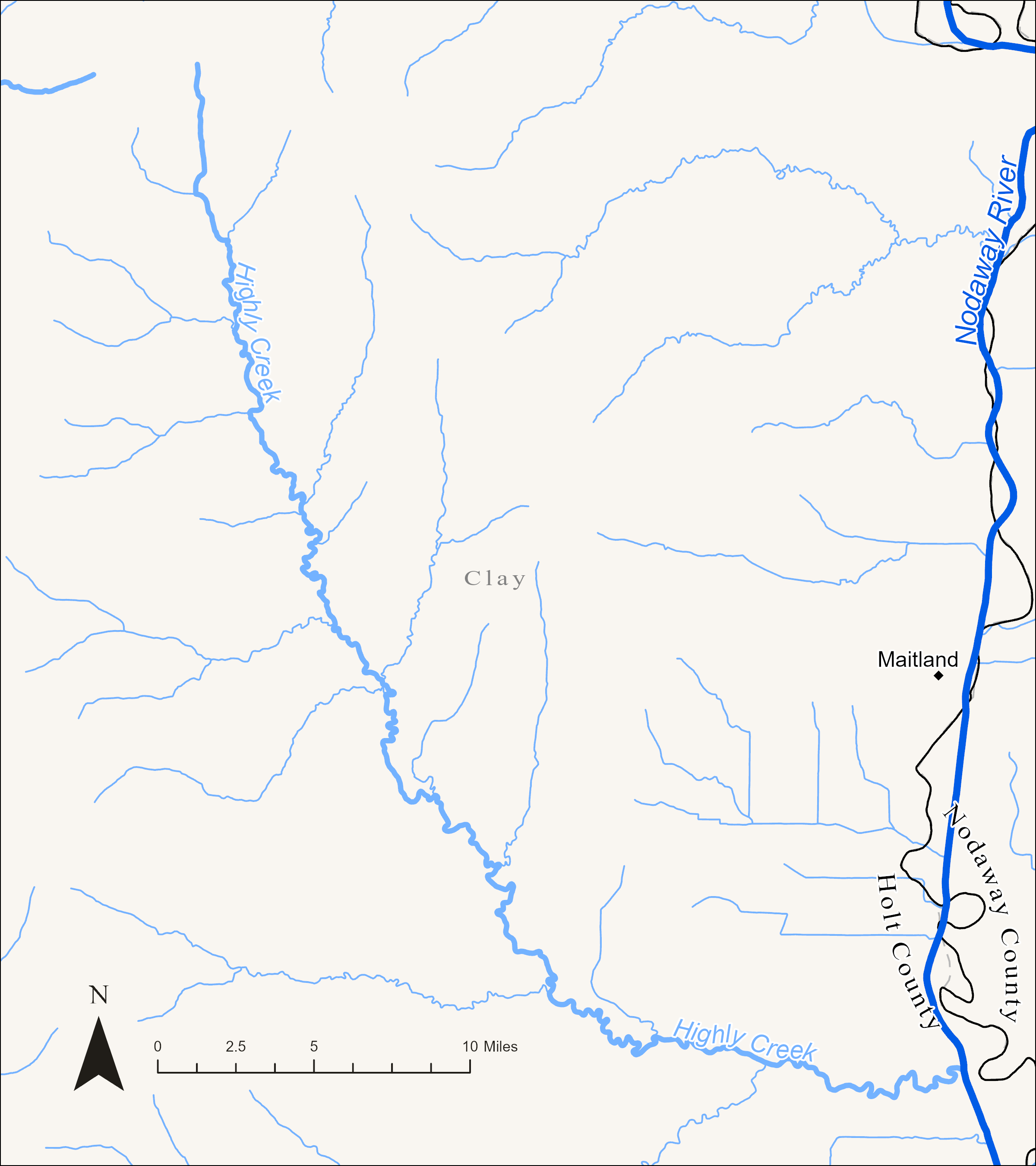
- Watershed map of Highly Creek

Location
- Country: United States
- State: Missouri
- County: Holt

Physical characteristics
- Source
  - location: Clay Township
  - coordinates: 40°14′36″N 95°08′10″W
  - elevation: 1,070 ft (330 m)
- Mouth: Nodaway River
  - location: Clay Township
  - coordinates: 40°10′32″N 95°04′07″W
  - elevation: 869 ft (265 m)
- Length: 9.5 mi (15.3 km)

Basin features
- Progression: Highly Creek → Nodaway River → Missouri River → Mississippi River → Atlantic Ocean
- Bridges: Stream gradient 20.1 ft/mi (3.81 m/km)

Highly Creek is a stream in the Whig Valley of Holt County in the U.S. state of Missouri. It is a tributary of the Nodaway River and is 9.5 miles long.

== Etymology ==
Highly Creek has the name of William Highley, a pioneer citizen. Two other names were formerly used, Buck Branch and Higley Creek. The name Highly Creek first appeared on a 1926 USGS map.

== Geography ==
Highly Creek is a right tributary of the Nodaway River and joins it 26.3 miles before its mouth in the Missouri River. It is the primary stream in the Whig Valley of Holt County, and along it is where the community called Whig Valley existed. It is the first major tributary to converge with the Nodaway River in Holt County.

=== Course ===
Highly Creek begins about 4 miles southwest of Skidmore and 1.5 miles south of the Atchison-Holt County border. The stream flows southeast and then curves east before it enters the Nodaway River about two miles south of Maitland.

=== Crossings ===
Two highways cross Highly Creek: Route 113 and Route C.

== See also ==
- Tributaries of the Nodaway River
- List of rivers of Missouri
