= High (Royal Headache album) =

Studio album by Royal Headache
- Released: 21 August 2015
- Recorded: 2015
- Genre: Punk rock
- Length: 28:45
- Label: What's Your Rupture?

Royal Headache chronology
Royal Headache (2011)	High (2015)

High is the second and final studio album by Australian punk rock band Royal Headache, released on 21 August 2015 by What's Your Rupture?.

== Recording ==
There was a gap of over two years between the beginning and end of recording. Sukit said, "About the end of 2012 we forced ourselves to go in record a new record and tracked everything. I think we were all a bit exhausted by the year and we listened back to it and we all thought it was a bit shit. So we lost motivation to work on it. Then we had that break and listened to it and were, 'Oh it's not that bad'. So Shogun finished his vocals and then we mixed it."

== Critical reception ==
Professional ratings
Aggregate scores
Source	Rating
AnyDecentMusic?	7.8/10
Metacritic	83/100
Review scores
Source	Rating
AllMusic	4/5 stars
Consequence of Sound	C+
Exclaim!	8/10
The Guardian	5/5 stars
The Irish Times	3/5 stars
NME	9/10
Pitchfork	8.0/10
Rolling Stone	3.5/5 stars
Spin	8/10
Uncut	7/10

Steve Lamacq of UK radio station BBC Radio 6 Music selected High as his album of the year, describing it as an "anonymous but brilliant punk album". In October 2017, High was listed at no.83 in the book, 100 Best Australian Albums.

=== Accolades ===
Publication	Accolade	Year	Rank
Rough Trade	Albums of the Year 2015	2015	8

== Track listing ==
No.	Title	Length
1.	"My Own Fantasy"	3:06
2.	"Need You"	2:24
3.	"High"	2:14
4.	"Another World"	2:22
5.	"Wouldn't You Know"	4:17
6.	"Garbage"	4:01
7.	"Love Her If I Tried"	3:03
8.	"Carolina"	3:15
9.	"Little Star (The Ballad of Delores)"	2:35
10.	"Electric Shock"	1:29
