= James Wyatt (art dealer) =

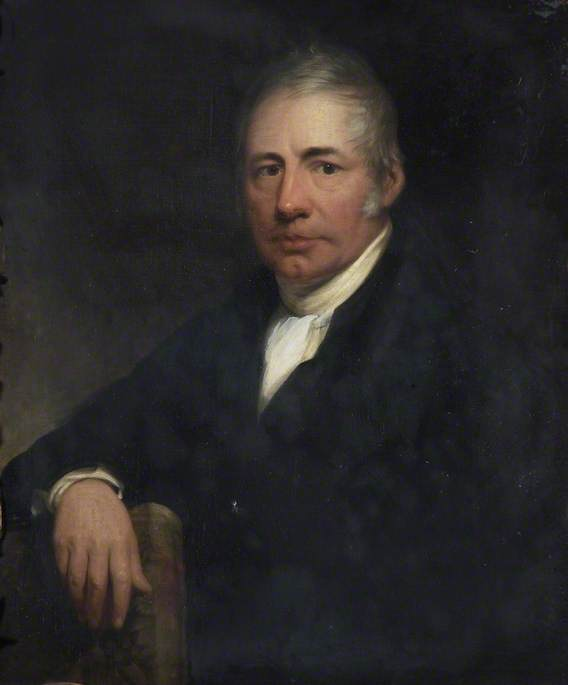
James Wyatt, painted by John Bridges in 1841. Oxford Town Hall, Oxford.

James Wyatt (14 March 1774 – 23 March 1853) was an English art dealer, collector, patron, gilder, print seller and curator, with a close connection with the artist John Everett Millais, as well as being the Mayor of Oxford for 1842/43.

== Life ==
Wyatt was born on 14 March 1774, the youngest child of Thomas Wyatt, a baker, and Anne Clanfield. He had five siblings: four brothers and a sister. On his 15th birthday Wyatt was apprenticed to Robert Archer, a carver and gilder in Oxford. He went into partnership with Archer in 1802 and the partnership was dissolved in 1806. On 22 March 1806 he opened a shop on the High Street in Oxford (no. 115), selling "Colours, and every Article for Drawing.—Paintings, Prints, and Needle Work, neatly framed and glazed.—Carving in all Kinds of Wood, Stone &c.—Concave and Convex Mirrors, Looking Glass Plates of all Sizes, with or without Frames, Girandoles, Sconces and Bordering for Rooms. Old Frames new gilt, in Oil or burnished Gold". He lived over the shop for the rest of his life.

In addition to his art dealing, Wyatt was a keen art collector and patron. In 1809 he commissioned an oil painting from J. M. W. Turner for 100 guineas, High Street, Oxford, which he intended to sell as a print. The painting was made through the winter of 1809–1810, and completed in March 1810. Wyatt then commissioned a pendant painting from Turner, View of Oxford from the Abingdon Road (NB, this is the old Abingdon Road, not the road that currently bears this name).

In 1823 Pigot's Directory list Wyatt as being a print seller in the High Street; in the 1841 census he is described as a gilder. In time he became the Curator of the Duke of Marlborough's art collection at Blenheim Palace.

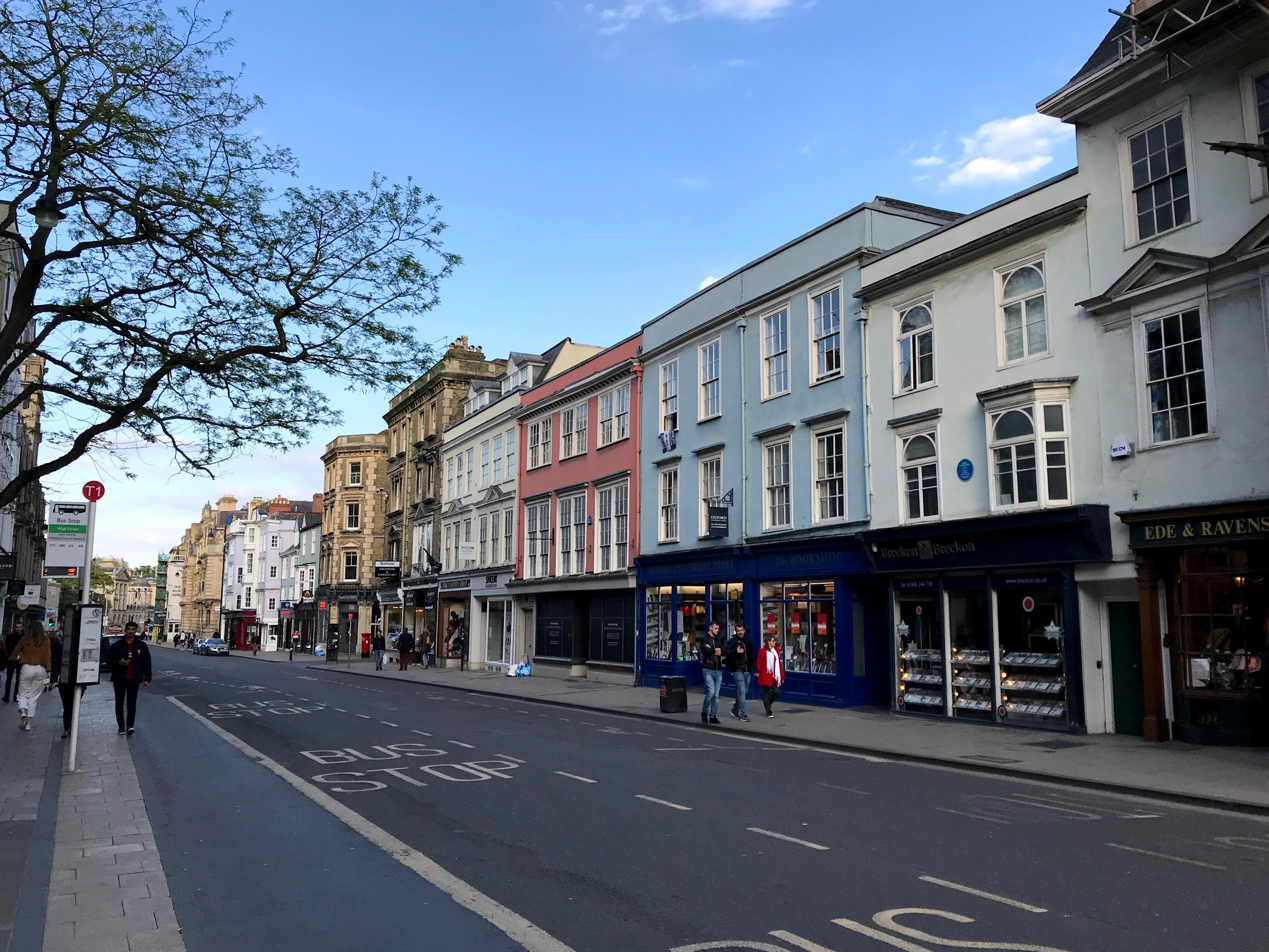
115 High Street, Oxford—Wyatt's shop and home for almost exactly 47 years—is the pink building at the centre of the photograph.

Wyatt had a close connection with the artist John Everett Millais, whom he is known to have known from at least 1846, when Millais made a watercolour portrait of Wyatt's granddaughter Mary (1845–1903, later Mrs James Standen). Wyatt bought Millais' painting Cymon and Iphigenia from the artist for £60 in 1849. That same year Wyatt commissioned three portraits from Millais: James Wyatt and his Granddaughter Mary (also known as Portrait of a Gentleman and his Grandchild, completed 1849); Portrait of Four Children of the Wyatt Family (completed 1849); and Mrs James Wyatt Jr and her Daughter Sarah, dating to c. 1850. The latter shows Wyatt's daughter-in-law Eliza (married to James Wyatt junior) and his granddaughter Sarah.

At the time of his death in 1853, Wyatt owned several oil sketches by Millais, including The Death of Romeo and Juliet, and many drawings that Millais had made while staying at Wyatt's house.

== Public life ==
Wyatt was "a prominent figure in Oxford’s public life for 38 years". He was elected on to the old Corporation in 1815, and on to the new one in 1837. He was elected Sheriff of Oxford for 1839/40, and as such accompanied the Mayor on his perambulation of the city bounds on 14 July 1840. He was made an Alderman in 1841, and in 1842 was elected Mayor for 1842/43.

== Family ==
Wyatt married Mary Cooke 13 February 1806 at St Peter-in-the-East Church, Oxford. They had six children between 1806 and 1817: Mary, Ann, Elizabeth, James junior, George and Sarah. James Wyatt junior helped with his father's business. Wyatt's wife Mary died in 1841. Wyatt died at home at 115 High Street at the age of 79 on 23 March 1853. His funeral was held at All Saints’ Church on 29 March 1853.

== Gallery ==
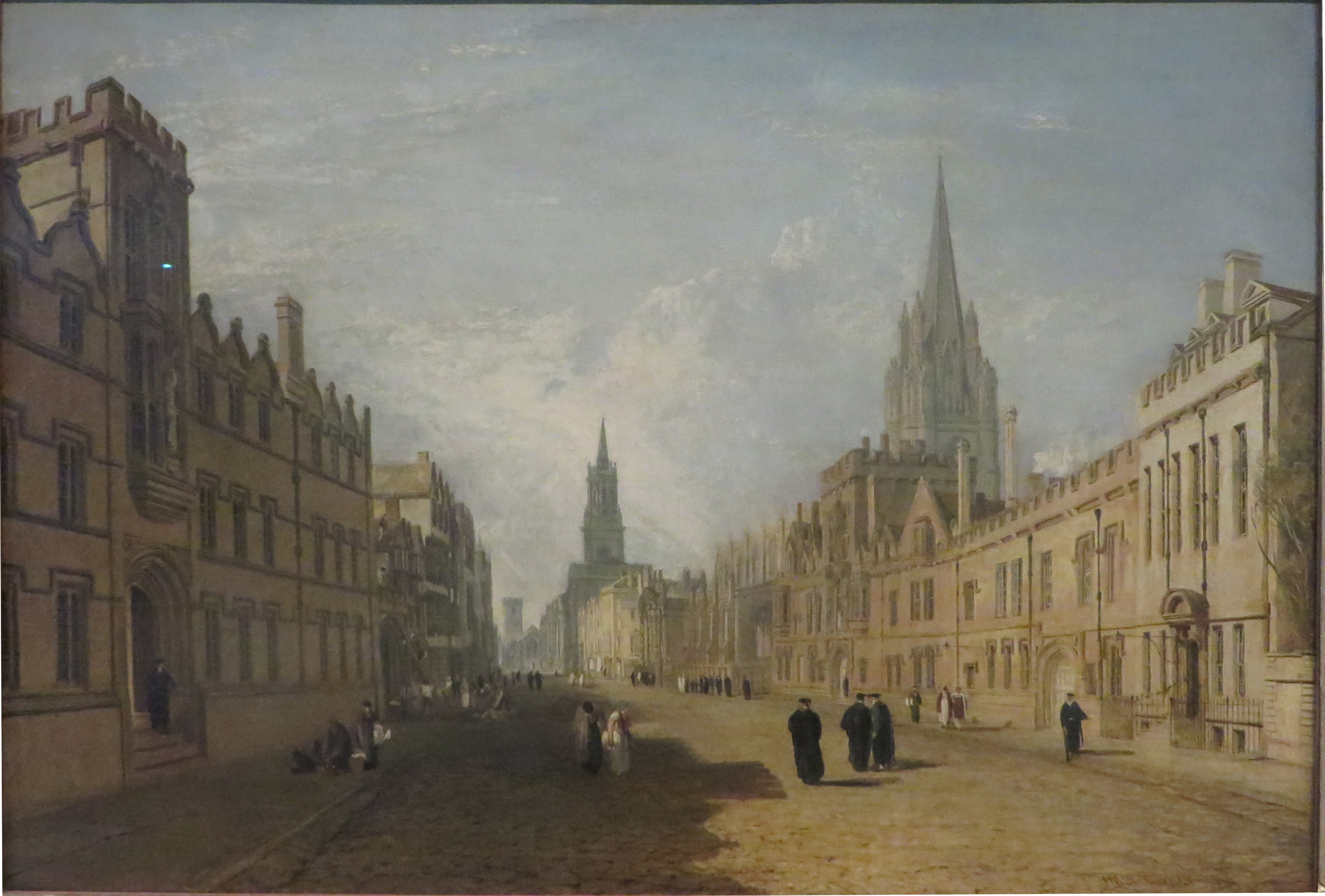
High Street, Oxford, by J. M. W. Turner, commissioned by Wyatt in 1809.

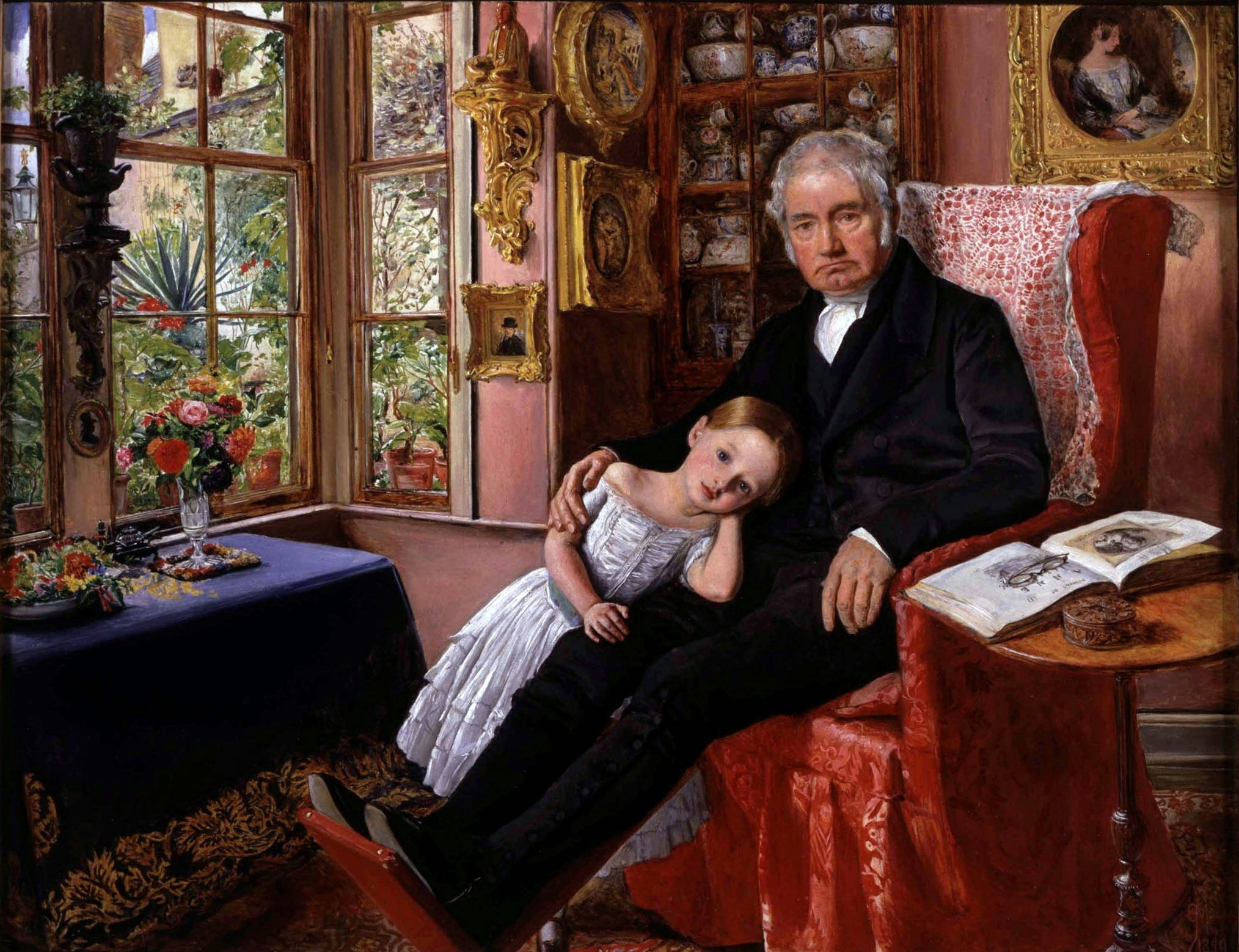
James Wyatt and his Granddaughter Mary, by John Everett Millais, commissioned by Wyatt in 1849.

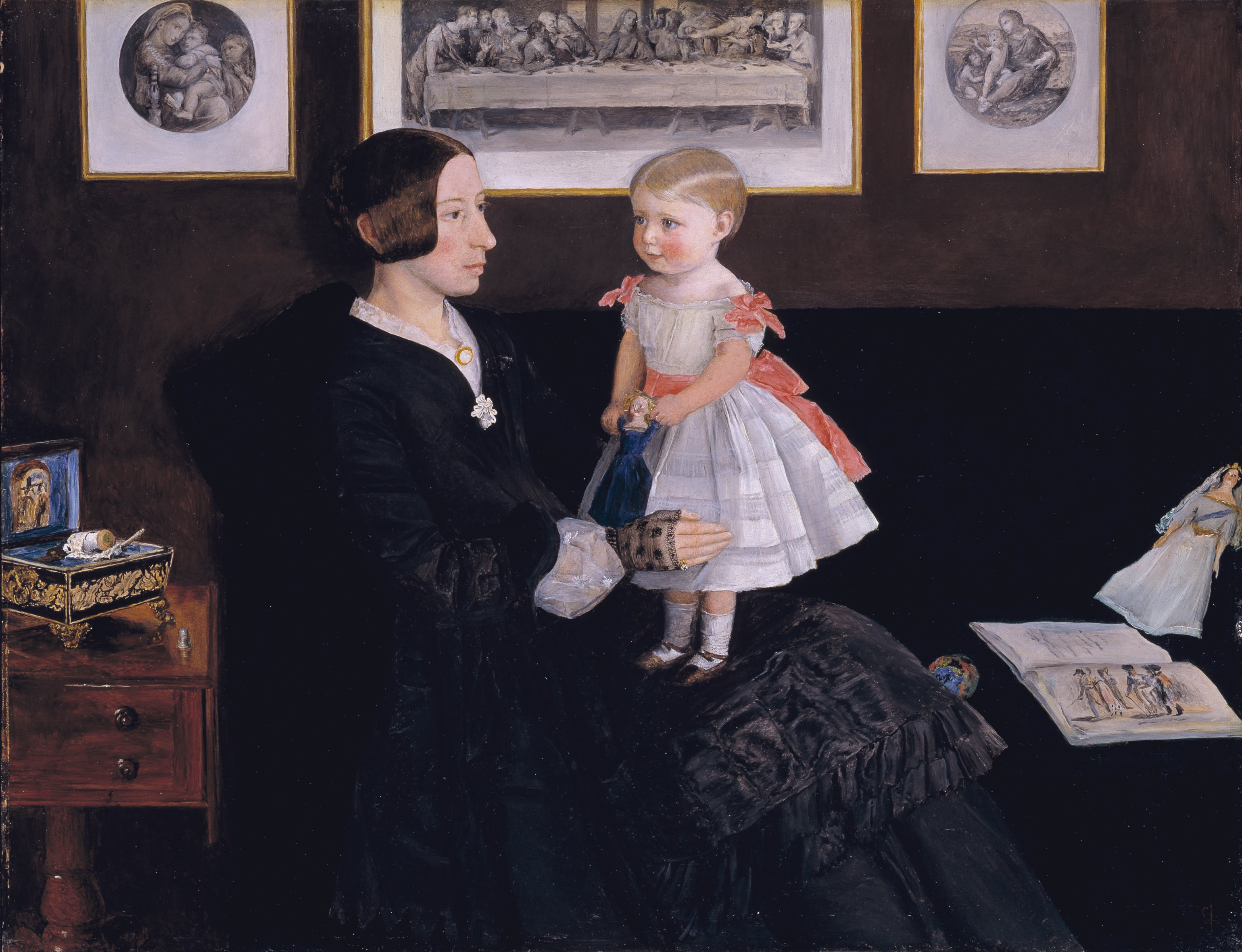
Mrs James Wyatt Jr and her Daughter Sarah, by John Everett Millais, commissioned by Wyatt in 1849.

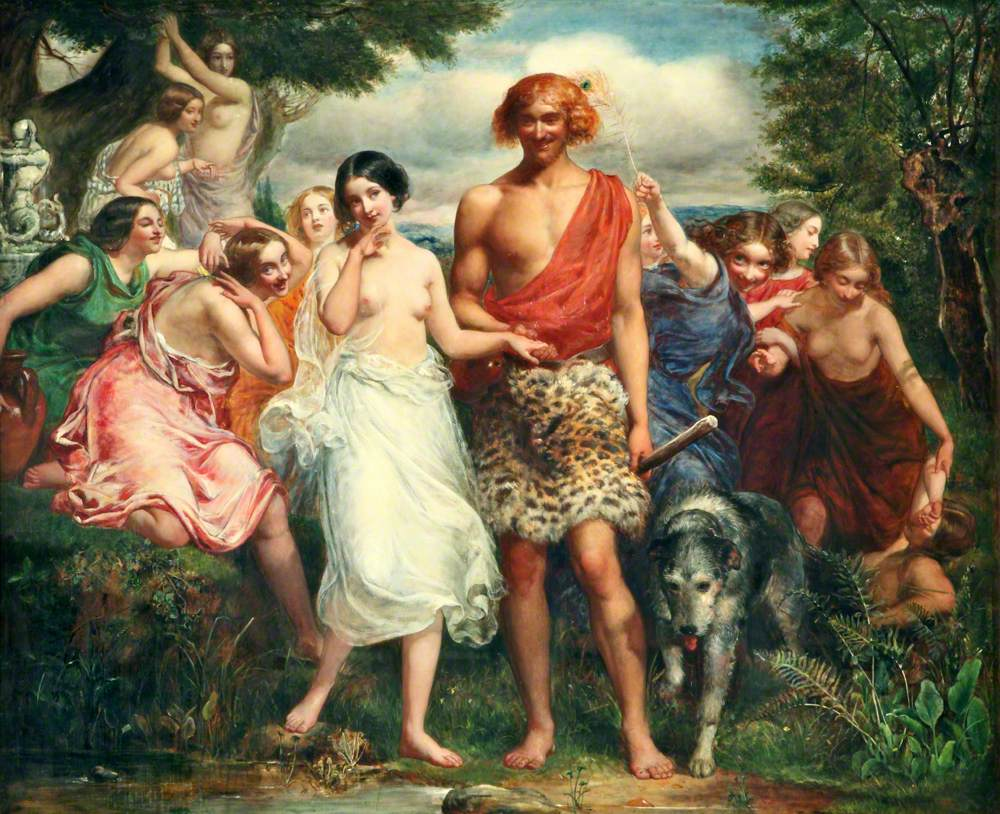
Cymon and Iphigenia, by John Everett Millais, bought by Wyatt in 1849.

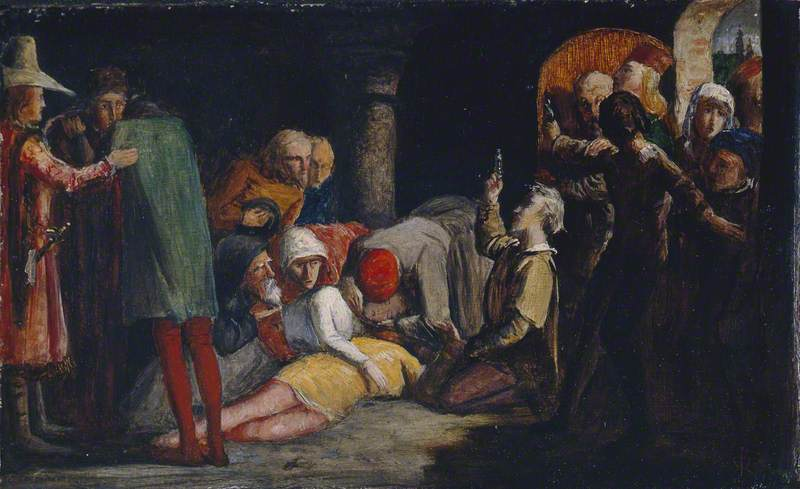
The Death of Romeo and Juliet (c. 1848), one of several oil sketches by John Everett Millais owned by Wyatt at the time of his death.
