= Higher Education (disambiguation) =

Higher education is tertiary education leading to the award of an academic degree.

Higher Education may also refer to:

- Higher Education (journal), bimonthly academic journal
- Higher Education (novel), 1996 science fiction novel by Charles Sheffield and Jerry Pournelle
- "Higher Education" (Weeds), a 2005 television episode
