= Steve High =

American former women's basketball coach

Biographical details
- Born: Keokuk, Iowa, U.S.
- Education: University of Northern Iowa

Coaching career (HC unless noted)
- 1985–1989: Nebraska (assistant)
- 1989–2007: Pittsburg State
- 2007–2011: Dodge City CC

Head coaching record
- Overall: 317–301 (.513)

Steve High is an American former women's basketball coach. Before retirement, High served as the head coach for the Dodge City Conquistadors women's basketball program from 2007 to 2011, and before that was the head coach at Pittsburg State University from 1989 to 2007.

== Career ==
=== Early career ===
High, a native of Keokuk, Iowa, began his career in athletics as a head basketball school at the high school level in Marion, Iowa, where he led the Linn-Mar High School girls program to a 67–25 (.728) record and the school's first-ever state championship. He served from 1981 to 1985. Following his successful high school career, High served as an assistant coach for the Nebraska Cornhuskers women's basketball program from 1985 to 1989.

=== Pittsburg State University ===
On April 24, 1989, High was named head coach for Pittsburg State University's women's basketball program, meaning he would help the program transition from the National Association of Intercollegiate Athletics to the NCAA Division II. During his 18 years as head coach, High led Pittsburg State to two Mid-America Intercollegiate Athletics Association regular season championships – 1992 and 1996 – and led the program to five NCAA Tournament postseason appearances in 1992, 1992, 1995, 1997, and 1998. High retired at the end of the 2006–07 season with an overall record of 296–201 (.596).

=== Dodge City Community College ===
Despite announcing his retirement effective the end of the 2006–07 season, High was hired as the Dodge City Community College (DC3) women's basketball head coach. During his time at DC3, High struggled to turn around the program, ending his DC3 career with an overall record of 21–100 (.174).

== Head coach record ==
Record table
Season	Team	Overall	Conference	Standing	Postseason
Pittsburg State Gorillas (Mid-America Intercollegiate Athletics Association) (1989–2007)
1989–90	Pittsburg State	13–13	0–0		
1990–91	Pittsburg State	11–14	8–8		
1991–92	Pittsburg State	22–9	14–2		NCAA Tournament
1992–93	Pittsburg State	21–7	12–4		NCAA Tournament
1993–94	Pittsburg State	18–9	9–7		
1994–95	Pittsburg State	22–7			NCAA Tournament
1995–96	Pittsburg State	17–9	12–4		
1996–97	Pittsburg State	19–10			NCAA Tournament
1997–98	Pittsburg State	18–11	10–6		NCAA Tournament
1998–99	Pittsburg State	19–8	11–5		
1999–2000	Pittsburg State	17–10	10–8		
2000–01	Pittsburg State	16–11	10–8		
2001–02	Pittsburg State	16–11	10–8		
2002–03	Pittsburg State	15–13	8–10		
2003–04	Pittsburg State	12–15	7–11		
2004–05	Pittsburg State	18–10	11–7		
2005–06	Pittsburg State	11–17	4–12		
2006–07	Pittsburg State	11–16	6–12		
Pittsburg State:		296–201 (.596)	169–135 (.556)		
Dodge City Conquistadors (Kansas Jayhawk Community College Conference) (2007–2011)
2007–08	Dodge City CC	5–25			
2008–09	Dodge City CC	5–25			
2009–10	Dodge City CC	4–27			
2010–11	Dodge City CC	7–23			
Pittsburg State:		21–100 (.174)			
Total:		317–301 (.513)			
National champion Postseason invitational champion Conference regular season champion Conference regular season and conference tournament champion Division regular season champion Division regular season and conference tournament champion Conference tournament champion
