= James Wyatt and his Granddaughter Mary =

Painting by John Everett Millais

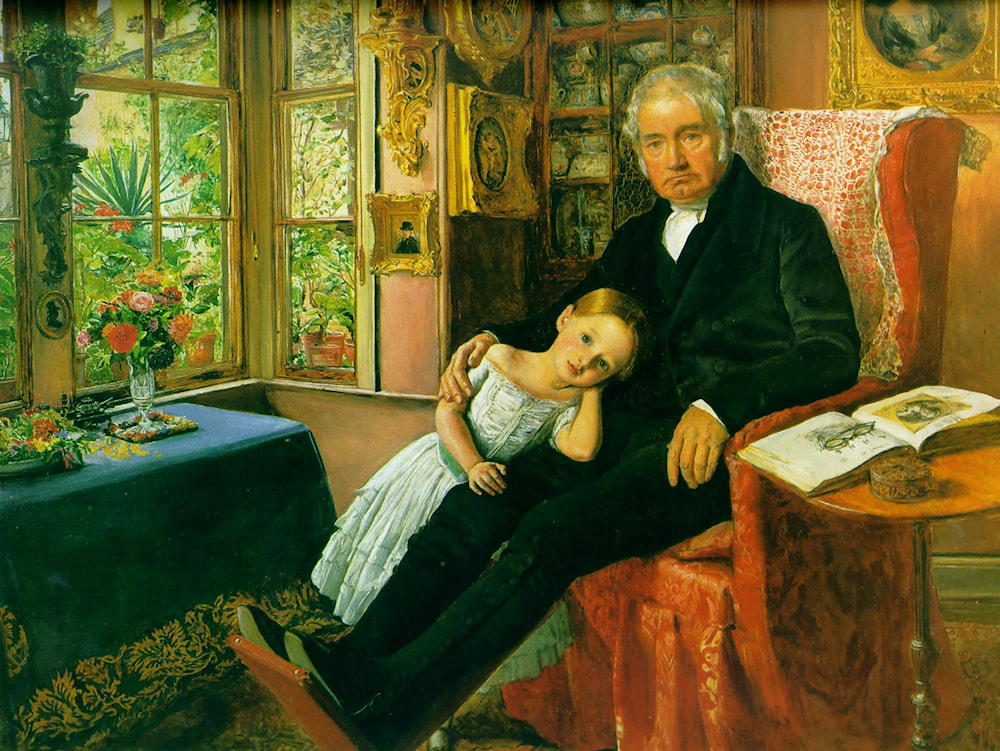
- Artist: John Everett Millais
- Year: 1849
- Type: Oil on panel
- Dimensions: 35.6 cm × 45.1 cm (14.0 in × 17.8 in)
- Location: Private collection: Andrew Lloyd Webber Collection

James Wyatt and his Granddaughter Mary, also known as Portrait of a Gentleman and his Grandchild, is an 1849 portrait by English artist John Everett Millais. It shows Oxford art dealer and patron, James Wyatt with one of his granddaughters, Mary.

== The painting ==
James Wyatt had known Millais since at least 1846, when Millais made a watercolour portrait of Wyatt's granddaughter Mary (1845–1903, later Mrs James Standen). Wyatt commissioned this painting and its pendant, Mrs James Wyatt Jr and her Daughter Sarah as a matching-sized pair. James Wyatt and his Granddaughter Mary was executed first.

The painting was made in a room in Wyatt's home at 115 High Street, Oxford, above Wyatt's shop. Millais stayed there from some time in September to between 15 and 18 October 1849, during which period he made the portrait.

The work was first shown at the Royal Academy in 1850. The painting hung under the title Portrait of a Gentleman and his Grandchild in a special Winter Exhibition at the Royal Academy, London, held between January and March 1898, which featured many collected works of the late Millais. At the time it was the property of James Wyatt, Esq., one of the sons of James Wyatt senior. The painting was sold by Sotheby's Important British Pictures and Watercolours auction, lot 27, in London on 8 June 1999 to Andrew Lloyd Webber for £600,000. In 2003 the painting was exhibited in the Pre-Raphaelite and Other Masters: The Andrew Lloyd Webber Collection exhibition at the Royal Academy in London.

== Copy painting ==
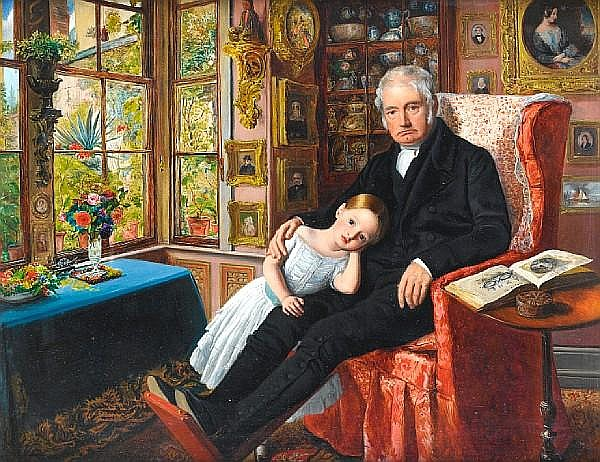
Copy painting of James Wyatt and his Granddaughter Mary made in 1850 by Millais' brother, William Henry Millais.

A copy of the painting was made in 1850 by Millais' brother William Henry Millais. He was commissioned to make the copy by James Wyatt junior, probably as a gift for his brother George Wyatt. The faces and hands of this copy painting were said to have been finished by Millais. Some of the details of the paintings on the walls, etc., are different from the original painting. The copy painting was sold by Bonhams in 2010 for £18,000.

== See also ==
- List of paintings by John Everett Millais
