= Interstate 29 in Missouri =

Highway in Missouri, U.S.

Interstate 29
- I-29 highlighted in red

Route information
- Maintained by MoDOT
- Length: 128.710 mi (207.139 km)
- Existed: 1963–present
- NHS: Entire route

Major junctions
- South end: Downtown Loop (Kansas City)
- I-35 in Kansas City; US 169 in Kansas City; I-635 / US 69 in Kansas City; I-435 in Kansas City; I-229 in St. Joseph; US 36 in St. Joseph; I-229 / US 59 / US 71 near Savannah; US 159 near Mound City; US 136 near Rock Port
- North end: I-29 at the Iowa state line in Hamburg, IA

Location
- Country: United States
- State: Missouri
- Counties: Jackson, Clay, Platte, Buchanan, Andrew, Holt, Atchison

Highway system
- Interstate Highway System; Main; Auxiliary; Suffixed; Business; Future; Missouri State Highway System; Interstate; US; State; Supplemental
← Route 28	→ Route 30

Interstate 29 (I-29) is a north–south Interstate Highway in the Midwestern United States that begins in Missouri. It travels through the Kansas City and St. Joseph metropolitan areas before exiting the state and entering Iowa. Almost all of I-29 in Missouri lies in an area called the Platte Purchase that was not originally part of Missouri when the state entered the Union in 1821.

== Route description ==

I-29 begins at I-70 in Kansas City in a concurrency with I-35 and U.S. Route 71 (US 71) at the Downtown Loop. It crosses over the Missouri River via the Bond Bridge. I-29 and I-35 separate in northern Kansas City, with I-29 turning northwest with US 71 running concurrent with it. It passes near Kansas City International Airport and near there is concurrent with I-435. I-29 then exits the Kansas City area. It enters the eastern portion of St. Joseph while downtown St. Joseph is served by I-229, a loop of I-29. North of St. Joseph, US 71 separates from I-29 and heads north. I-29 then passes through rural areas of northwestern Missouri on a southeast-to-northwest alignment. After Exit 79 which serves U.S. 159, I-29 descends a hill to the valley of the Missouri River and the base of the Loess Hills, and remains mainly flat for the remainder of its route in Missouri, its entire route in Iowa and for about 35 miles in South Dakota. I-29 then crosses into Iowa north of Rock Port, approximately 55 miles (89 km) south of Council Bluffs.

== History ==
During the 2019 Midwestern US floods, I-29 in Missouri was closed to traffic in both directions from St. Joseph to Council Bluffs, Iowa when the highway got flooded. It reopened to traffic by October 2019.

== Exit list ==
County	Location	mi	km	Exit	Destinations	Notes
Jackson	Kansas City	0.000– 0.185	0.000– 0.298		I-35 south / I-70 / US 24 west / US 40 west – Wichita, Topeka	Downtown Loop; MoDOT signs this as the national southern terminus; southern end of I-35/US 24 concurrency; I-70 exit 2G-H
Jackson	Kansas City	0.000– 0.185	0.000– 0.298	2F	Oak Street / Grand Avenue / Walnut Street	Northbound access via exit 2E; no northbound entrance; no access to this exit from I-70 westbound
Jackson	Kansas City	0.000– 0.185	0.000– 0.298	2H	Admiral Boulevard Route 9 north – North Kansas City US 24 Bus. (Independence Avenue)	Exit numbers follow I-35; former northern end of US 24 concurrency; northbound exit and southbound entrance; access to Kansas City University School of Medicine and Biosciences
Jackson	Kansas City	0.000– 0.185	0.000– 0.298	2J	11th Street Downtown	Southbound exit and northbound entrance
Jackson	Kansas City	0.000– 0.185	0.000– 0.298	3	I-70 east / US 24 east / US 40 east / US 71 south – St. Louis, Joplin	Southern end of US 71 concurrency; southbound left exit and northbound entrance; I-70 exit 2G; US 71 heads south to the Grandview Triangle; I-70 heads east to I-435 in Kansas City
Jackson	Kansas City	0.530	0.853	4A	The Paseo (Independence Avenue) to US 24 Bus.	Southbound left exit and northbound entrance
Jackson	Kansas City	1.077	1.733	4B	Front Street / Grand Boulevard	Signed as exit 4 northbound
Missouri River		1.282– 1.569	2.063– 2.525	Christopher S. Bond Bridge		
Clay	North Kansas City	1.616	2.601	5A	Levee Road	Southbound exit and northbound entrance; signed as exit 5 southbound
Clay	North Kansas City	1.668	2.684	5A	Bedford Street	Northbound exit and southbound entrance
Clay	North Kansas City	2.418	3.891	5B	16th Avenue	Northbound exit and southbound entrance
Clay	North Kansas City	2.996– 3.015	4.822– 4.852	6	Route 210 east (Armour Road)	Access to North Kansas City Hospital
Clay	Kansas City	4.546	7.316	8A	Parvin Road	
Clay	Kansas City	4.614	7.426	8B	I-35 north – Des Moines	Northern end of I-35 concurrency; northbound exit and southbound left entrance; exit numbers follow I-29
Clay	Kansas City	5.040	8.111	1A	Davidson Road	
Clay	Kansas City	5.094	8.198	1B	I-35 north – Des Moines	Southbound exit and northbound entrance; I-35 exit 8B
Clay	Kansas City	6.112	9.836	1C	Route 283 south (Oak Trafficway)	Split into exits 1C (north) and 1D (south) southbound; signed as exit 1B only northbound; access to Midwestern Baptist Seminary
Clay	Kansas City	6.584	10.596	1E	US 69 (Vivion Road)	Signed as exit 1C northbound
Clay	Kansas City	6.986– 7.080	11.243– 11.394	2	US 169 – Smithville	Access to Downtown Kansas City and Smithville Lake; signed as exits 2A (north) and 2B (south), exit 2 northbound; no access to US-169 southbound from I-29 northbound
Platte	Kansas City	7.890	12.698	3A	Route AA (NW Waukomis Drive)	Northbound exit and southbound entrance only
Platte	Kansas City	8.284	13.332	3C	Route A (NW Gateway Drive)	Southbound exit and northbound entrance only
Platte	Kansas City	8.264– 8.494	13.300– 13.670	3B	I-635 south – Kansas	Northbound left exit; I-635 exits 12A-B
Platte	Kansas City	8.847	14.238	4	NW 56th Street	Northbound exit and southbound entrance only
Platte	Kansas City	10.226	16.457	5	Route 45 north (NW 64th Street)	
Platte	Platte Woods	11.420	18.379	6	NW 72nd Street – Platte Woods	
Platte	Kansas City	13.019	20.952	8	To Route 9 (Northwest Barry Road) – Parkville	Access to National American University and St. Luke's North Hospital
Platte	Kansas City	13.543– 13.565	21.795– 21.831	9	Route 152 – Topeka, Liberty	Signed as exits 9A (east) and 9B (west); exit 9 northbound
Platte	Kansas City	15.002	24.143	10	Tiffany Springs Parkway / Ambassador Drive	Ambassador Drive not signed southbound; diverging diamond interchange
Platte	Kansas City	16.800	27.037	12	NW 112th Street	
Platte	Kansas City	17.818	28.675	13	To I-435 east (Route D) – Kansas City International Airport, St. Louis	
Platte	Kansas City	18.466– 18.702	29.718– 30.098	14	I-435 east – St. Louis	Southern end of I-435 concurrency; northbound exit is via exit 13; southbound exit and northbound entrance
Platte	Kansas City	19.635	31.599	15	Mexico City Avenue	
Platte	Platte City	21.499– 22.394	34.599– 36.040	17	I-435 south – Topeka	Northern end of I-435 concurrency
Platte	Platte City	22.856	36.783	18	Route 92 – Platte City, Weston, Leavenworth, Smithville	
Platte	Platte City	24.020	38.656	19	Route HH (Main Street)	
Platte	Fair Township	25.567	41.146	20	Route 273 north / Route 371 – Tracy, Weston	
Platte	Green Township	30.090	48.425	25	Route E / Route U – Camden Point	
Platte	Dearborn	34.626	55.725	30	Route H / Route Z – New Market, Dearborn	
Buchanan	Crawford Township	40.363	64.958	35	Route DD – Faucett	
Buchanan	Washington Township	47.503– 48.057	76.449– 77.340	43	I-229 north – Downtown St. Joseph	
Buchanan	St. Joseph	48.941	78.763	44	US 169 / I-29 BL north – St. Joseph, Gower	
Buchanan	St. Joseph	50.448– 50.908	81.188– 81.928	46	US 36 – St. Joseph, Cameron	Signed as exits 46A (east) and 46B (west)
Buchanan	St. Joseph	52.599	84.650	47	Route 6 (Frederick Boulevard) – Clarksdale	
Buchanan	St. Joseph	55.288	88.977	50	US 169 – St. Joseph, King City	
Andrew	Jefferson Township	58.363	93.926	53	US 59 south / I-29 BL south / US 71 Bus. north – St. Joseph, Savannah	Southern end of US 59 concurrency
Andrew	Jefferson Township	61.369– 61.921	98.764– 99.652	56	I-229 south / US 59 north / US 71 north – Maryville	Northern end of US 59/US 71 concurrency; signed as exits 56A (north) and 56B (south)
Andrew	Lincoln Township	64.774	104.244	60	Route CC / Route K – Amazonia	
Andrew	Jackson Township	69.954	112.580	65	US 59 south / Route RA / Lewis and Clark Trail – Fillmore, Savannah	Southern end of US 59 concurrency
Holt	Nodaway Township	72.187	116.174	67	US 59 north / Lewis and Clark Trail – Oregon	Northern end of US 59 concurrency
Holt	Hickory Township	80.321	129.264	75	US 59 – Oregon	
Holt	Benton Township	83.844	134.934	79	US 159 – Rulo	
Holt	Mound City	88.804	142.916	84	Route 118 – Mound City	
Holt	Union Township	96.924	155.984	92	US 59 – Craig, Fairfax	
Holt–Atchison county line	Lincoln–Clark township line	103.902	167.214	99	Route W – Corning	
Atchison	Clay Township	112.453	180.976	107	Route 111 – Langdon, Rock Port	
Atchison	Rock Port	115.410	185.734	110	US 136 – Rock Port	
Atchison	Nishnabotna Township	120.636	194.145	116	Route A / Route B – Watson	
Atchison	Nishnabotna Township	128.710	207.139		I-29 north / Lewis and Clark Trail – Council Bluffs (Note: The Iowa Department of Transportation signs the Lewis and Clark Trail on I-29 north of the state line. However, the Missouri Department of Transportation signs the trail on a route following US 59, Route 111, US 136, and US 275 from exit 67 to the Iowa state line.)	Continuation into Iowa
1.000 mi = 1.609 km; 1.000 km = 0.621 mi: Concurrency terminus; Incomplete access

== Auxiliary route ==
I-29 has one auxiliary route in Missouri:

- I-229: A bypass around the west side of St. Joseph

Interstate 29
Previous state: Terminus	Missouri	Next state: Iowa
