= Downtown Loop (Kansas City) =

Highway in Missouri

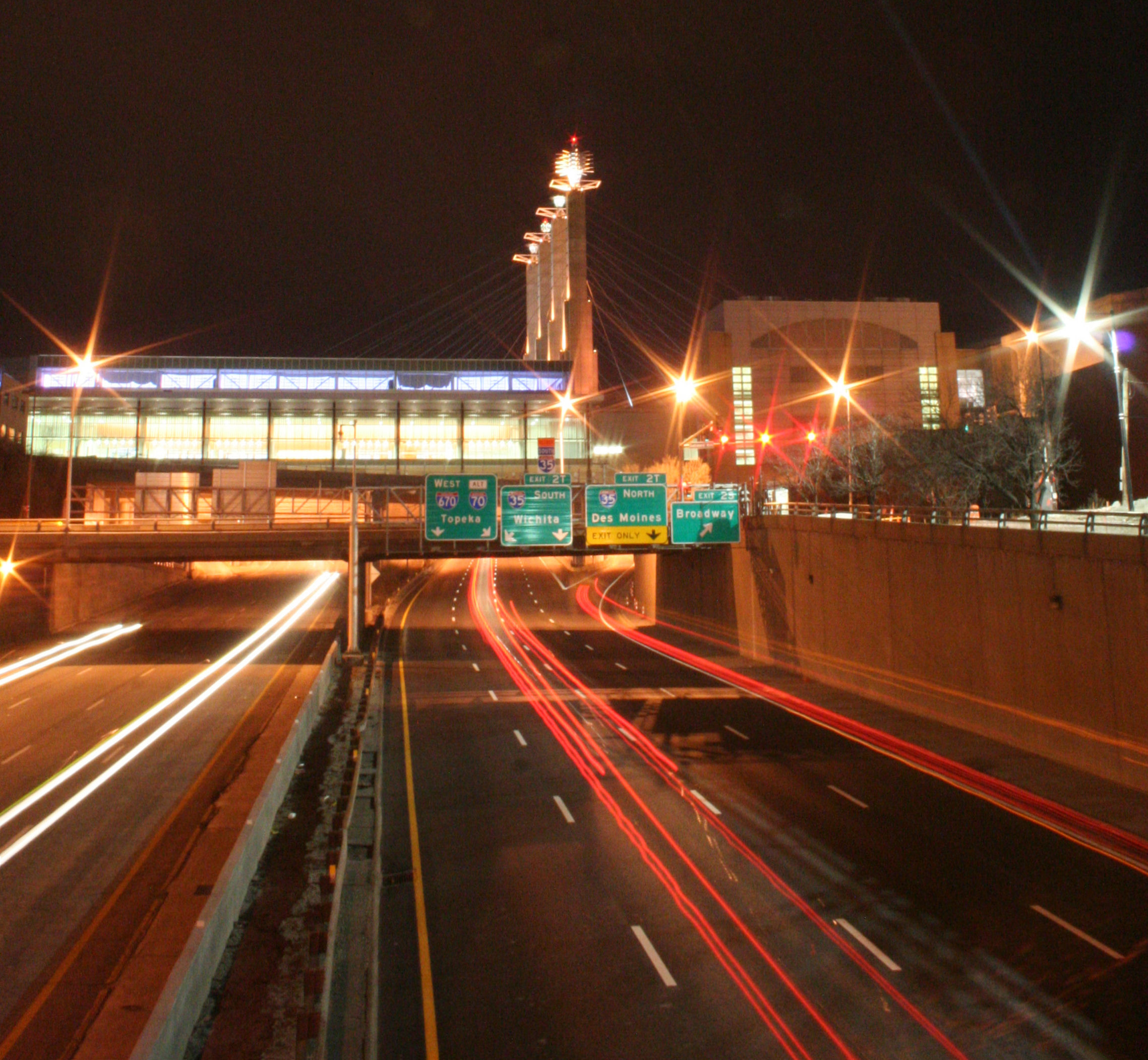
- The southern portion of the loop (Interstate 670) at night

Location
- Kansas City, Missouri
- Coordinates: 39.1017°N 94.5825°W
- Roads at junction: I-29; I-35; I-70; I-670; US 24; US 40; US 71; US 169; Route 9

Construction
- Type: Loop around downtown
- Maintained by: MoDOT

The Downtown Loop (nicknamed the Alphabet Loop) is a complex layout of highways in Downtown Kansas City, Missouri involving 24 exits, four Interstate Highways, four U.S. Highways, and numerous city streets. Each exit is numbered 2 and suffixed with every letter of the alphabet except I and O (to avoid confusion with the numbers 1 and 0). The circumference of the loop is just over 4 miles (6.4 km). Development is underway to add a dome cap, topped with Luminary Park.

== Overview ==
The system is nicknamed the Alphabet Loop because its exits have letter suffixes that are nearly all the letters of the English alphabet. They begin with A in the northwest corner of the loop and rise clockwise. Eastbound on the north side of the loop (EB I-70/NB I-35) are A through G; then H through M southbound on the east side (EB I-70/SB US 71); then N through U westbound on the south side (WB I-670); and finally V through Z northbound on the west side (NB I-35 alone).

Interstate 70 enters the southeast corner of the loop and moves north, forming the east and north sides of the loop and exiting in the northwest corner. Exits on I-70 range from 2A to 2M.

Interstate 35 enters the loop at its northeast corner, joining I-70 on the north side and forming the west side of the loop before exiting in the southwest corner. Exits on I-35 range from 2F to 2A while it overlaps I-70, and 2Y to 2U after I-70 exits the loop.

Interstate 29 does not enter the loop. It begins at the northeast corner and continues north, concurrent with I-35. These two leave the loop via the Christopher S. Bond Bridge and split several miles north.

Interstate 670 forms the south side of the loop. I-670 splits from I-70 in Kansas City, Kansas, crosses over I-70 and enters the loop in the southwest corner, rejoining I-70 and ending in Kansas City, Missouri, in the southeast corner of the loop. I-670 is also signed as Alternate I-70.

U.S. Route 71 is a highway that enters the loop in the southeast corner and leaves the loop with I-29 and I-35 in the northeast corner.

U.S. Route 24 is a major city street that enters the loop in the northeast corner and follows I-35 and I-70 along the north side of the loop. Former US 24 now US-Bus 24 is also known as Independence Ave/Blvd and provides a street-level connection to Independence, Missouri.

U.S. Route 40 overlaps I-70 throughout the northern and eastern sections of the loop.

U.S. Route 169 enters the loop in the northwest corner from the Buck O'Neil Bridge, and joins I-70, continuing westward.

Route 9 also provides access to the loop, ending at I-70 after crossing the Heart of America Bridge from North Kansas City.

== History ==
The west side of the loop was built over a scenic road called Kersey Coates Drive. It had many affluent homes, and stairs lead down from Case Park immediately to the east. When the loop was completed, the multi-lane Interstate cut further into the bluff and these homes were razed. The stairway from Case Park was cut off halfway and remains between exits 2W and 2X.

A March 2010 preliminary study of the Kansas City I-70 corridor made several innovative suggestions to relieve congestion in the downtown area. One proposal was to make the loop unidirectional, where the loop would essentially become a large roundabout.

Luminary Park is a 5.5-acre (2.2 ha) public park being built upon a deck, or lid, capping the sunken portion of I-670 and spanning four city blocks from Wyandotte Street to Grand Boulevard. It is intended to reconnect Downtown Kansas City with the Crossroads Arts District and begin to counteract the effects of mid-20th century nationwide urban renewal movement. The construction of the freeway in the 1960s is considered a destructive and ill-conceived example of urban renewal because it was routed through dense, predominantly Black neighborhoods designated as "blighted" to reduce land acquisition costs, which severed community connections and displaced thousands of residents. The construction created a trench about 20 to 30 ft (6.1 to 9.1 m) deep known as the "Kansas City Cut", establishing a formidable barrier that eliminated an estimated 100 blocks of the city's urban fabric. This historic division is to be addressed by creating a walkable green space that links the neighborhoods, as an act of restorative urbanism intended to "restitch" and "reweave the urban fabric".

== Exit list ==
The exits as encountered when entering the loop from eastbound I-70 are:

=== Clockwise exits ===
The entire route is in Kansas City, Jackson County.

mi	km	Exit	Destinations	Notes
		2D	Main Street	
		2E	Route 9 north / Oak Street	
		2G	I-35 north / I-29 north	Left exit
		2H	US 24 Bus. east	Left exit
		2J	11th Street	
			I-70 east / US 40 east I-70 east to I-435 south – St. Louis, Joplin	Left exit
		2M	US 71 south	Left exit
		2L	I-670 to I-35 south	Continuation of Loop
		2S	Broadway	
			I-70 alt / I-670 west	Left exit
		2T	I-35 south / I-35 north	Continuation of Loop
			I-35 south	Left exit
			I-35 north / 12th Street	Continuation of Loop
		2W	12th Street	
		2X	I-70 west / US 40 west / US 169 south	
		2Y	US 169 north	
		2Z	Broadway	
1.000 mi = 1.609 km; 1.000 km = 0.621 mi

=== Counterclockwise exits ===
The entire route is in Kansas City, Jackson County.

mi	km	Exit	Destinations	Notes
		2W	12th Street	
			I-35 south	
		2U	I-70 east	Continuation of Loop; left exit
		2M	US 71 south	
			I-70 east / US 40 east I-70 east to I-435 south – St. Louis, Joplin	
		2N	I-35 north / I-29 north / US 71 north	Continuation of Loop; left exit
		2H	To US 24 Bus. east / Route 9 north / Admiral Boulevard	
		2G	I-29 north / I-35 north / US 71 north	
		2F	Oak Street, Grand Avenue, Walnut Street	
		2D	Main-Delaware, Wyandotte Street	
		2C	US 169 north / Broadway	
			I-70 west / US 40 west / US 169 south	
		2A	I-35 south	Continuation of Loop
1.000 mi = 1.609 km; 1.000 km = 0.621 mi

=== Entrances ===
The entire route is in Kansas City, Jackson County.

mi	km	Exit	Destinations	Notes
		2B	Beardsley	Beardsley Road southbound; only accessible from I-70 east entrance
		2K	Harrison Street, Troost Avenue	only accessible from I-70 west entrance
		2P	13th Street – Downtown	only accessible from I-670 west entrance
		2Q	Locust Street, Truman Road	only accessible from I-670 west entrance
		2R	Central Street – Downtown	left exit; only accessible from I-670 east entrance
		2V	14th Street – Downtown	only accessible from I-35 north entrance
1.000 mi = 1.609 km; 1.000 km = 0.621 mi

== See also ==
- Spaghetti junction
