= Washington Township, Buchanan County, Missouri =

Township in Buchanan County, Missouri, U.S.

Washington Township
- Township
- Coordinates: 39°45′27″N 94°49′08″W
- Country: United States
- State: Missouri
- County: Buchanan

Area
  - Total: 80.66 sq mi (208.9 km^{2})
  - Land: 78.47 sq mi (203.2 km^{2})
  - Water: 2.19 sq mi (5.7 km^{2}) 2.72%
- Elevation: 961 ft (293 m)

Population (2020)
  - Total: 74,635
  - Density: 951.1/sq mi (367.2/km^{2})
- FIPS code: 29-02177236
- GNIS feature ID: 766346

Washington Township is a township in Buchanan County, Missouri, United States. At the 2020 census, its population was 74635.

Washington Township was established in 1842, and named after President George Washington.

== Geography ==
Washington Township covers an area of 82.24 square miles (213.0 km^{2}) and contains one incorporated settlement, St. Joseph (the county seat). It contains nine cemeteries: Ashland, B'nai Sholem, Memorial Park, Mount Auburn, Mount Mora, Mount Olivet, Nelson, Ozenberger and Walnut Grove.

Browning Lake and Lake Contrary are within this township. The streams of Candy Creek, Roys Branch, and Whitehead Creek run through this township.

== Transportation ==
Washington Township contains three airports or landing strips: Butchs Strip, Mosaic Hospital West Heliport, and Rosecrans Memorial Airport.

=== Major highways ===
The following highways travel through the township:

- Interstate 29
- Interstate 229
- U.S. Route 36
- U.S. Route 59
- U.S. Route 71
- U.S. Route 169
- Route 6
- Route 371
- Route 752
- Route 759
- Route A
- Route AC
- Route FF
- Route K
- Route U
- Route W
- Route YY
