= Bee Creek (Missouri River tributary) =

Stream in northwest Missouri, U.S.

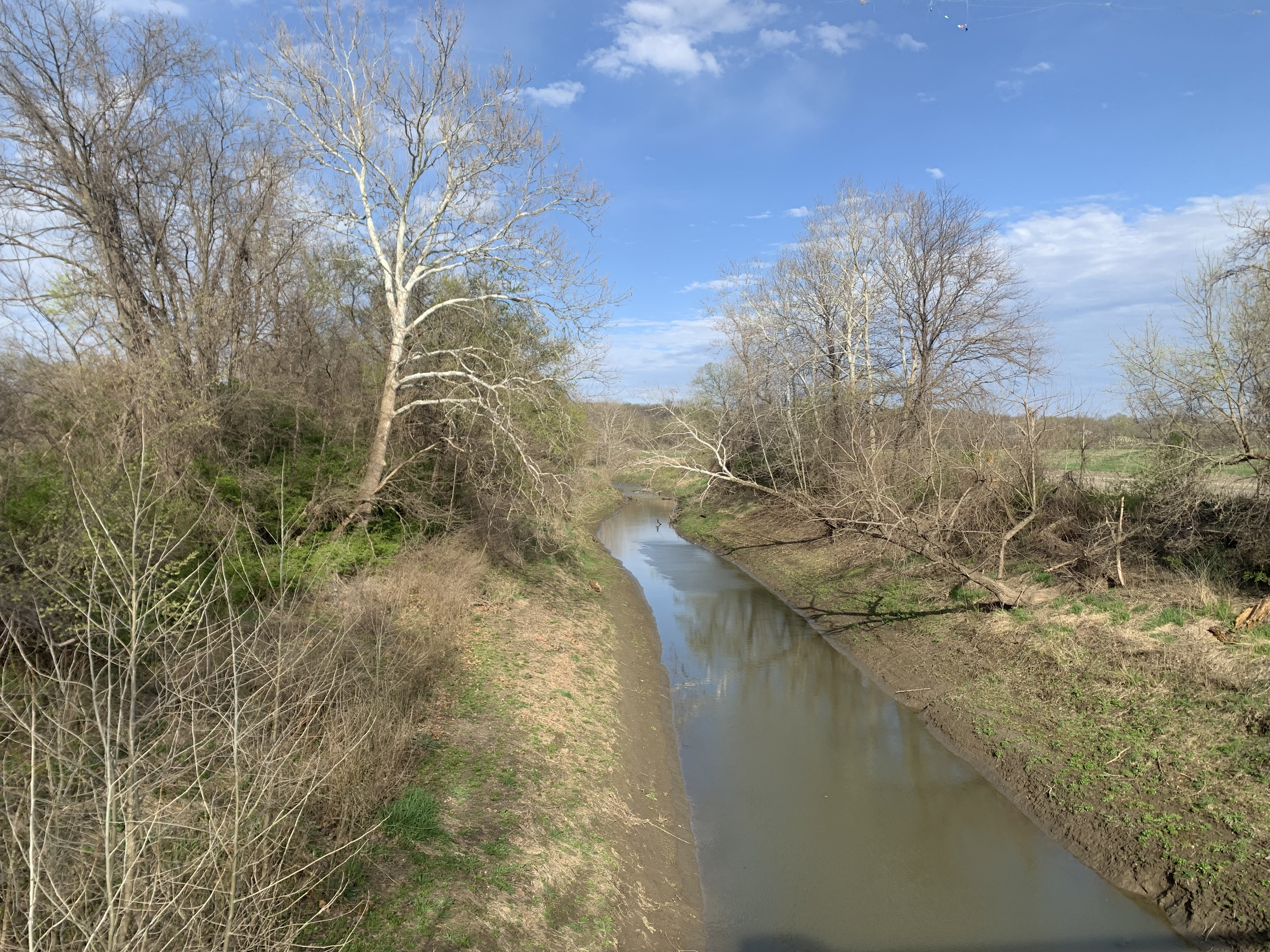
- Bee Creek at S Bluff Rd Bridge at Weston Bend State Park

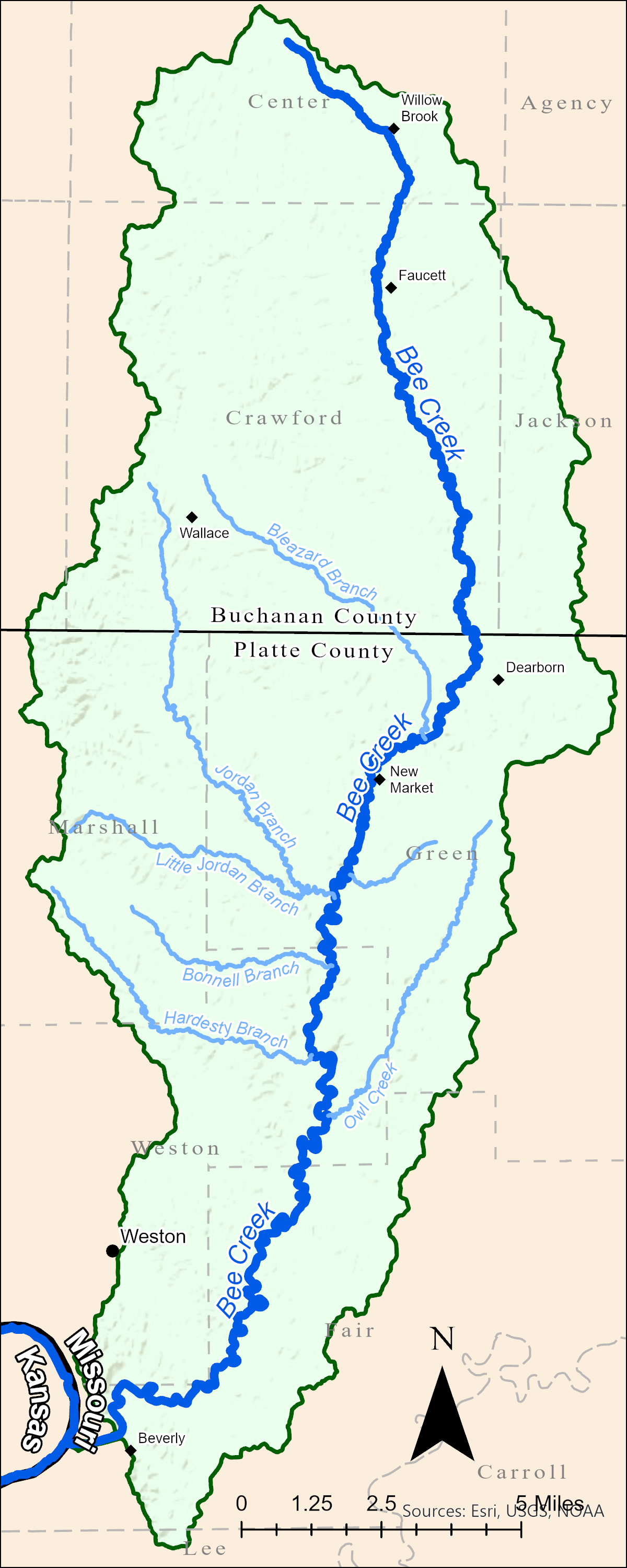
- Watershed of Bee Creek

Location
- Country: United States
- State: Missouri
- County: Buchanan and Platte

Physical characteristics
- Source
  - location: Center Township
  - coordinates: 39°38′57″N 94°49′26″W
  - elevation: 1,070 ft (330 m)
- Mouth: Missouri River
  - location: Fair Township
  - coordinates: 39°22′12″N 94°52′49″W
  - elevation: 748 ft (228 m)
- Length: 34.7 mi (55.8 km)
- Basin size: 101.4 sq mi (263 km^{2})

Basin features
- Progression: Bee Creek → Missouri River → Mississippi River → Atlantic Ocean

Bee Creek is a stream in Buchanan and Platte counties of the U.S. state of Missouri. It is a tributary of the Missouri River.

== History ==
Bee Creek was so named because of the presence of honeybees in the area.

== Geography ==
Bee Creek is a left tributary of the Missouri River and joins it about 34 miles upstream from Kaw Point in Kansas City, and 401 miles before its mouth in the Mississippi River. The land surrounding Bee Creek is a mix of woodlands and croplands. There is one state park and two conservation areas in the Bee Creek watershed: Weston Bend State Park, Bee Creek Conservation Area, and Guy B Park Conservation Area. Also, Bee Creek comprises the southeastern boundary of Weston Bend State Park. There are a three notable water bodies in the watershed: Beverly Lake, Dearborn Reservoir, and Trickey Lake.

=== Communities ===
There are six communities in the watershed of Bee Creek and four of them are directly on Bee Creek. The communities are: Willow Brook, Faucett, and Wallace, in Buchanan County; and Dearborn (the only incorporated city), New Market, and Beverly, in Platte County. The city of Weston lies just outside the watershed.

=== Course ===
The stream headwaters arise in central Buchanan County about 2 miles west of the community of Willow Brook and four miles south of St Joseph. It heads east then turns southeast at Willow Brook and heads south for 2.5 miles until reaching Faucett. The stream continues southeast and is crossed by I-29 and reaches Dearborn after 5.5 miles. From there the stream meanders southwest, is crossed by I-29 again, and reaches New Market. Bee Creek continues south-southwest about 8 miles before reaching Route 273 and turning west-southwest. The stream passes just northwest of Beverly and deposits into the Missouri River just south of Weston Bend State Park.

=== Tributaries ===
There are 7 named direct and indirect tributaries of Bee Creek: Spring Creek, Owl Creek, Hardesty Branch, Bonnell Branch, Jordan Branch, Singleton Branch, and Bleazard Branch.

=== Crossings ===
Bee Creek is crossed by one railroad and ten highways. The railroad crossing is with the BNSF just before the mouth of Bee Creek about 0.5 miles west-northwest of Beverly. The following highways cross Bee Creek in Buchanan County: I-29, US 71, Route 116, Route A, Route H, and Route DD. And the following highways cross Bee Creek in Platte County: I-29, US 71, Route 45, Route 273, Route 371, and Route Z. The concurrency of I-29 and US 71 is the only highway to cross the stream twice.

== See also ==
- List of tributaries of the Missouri River
- List of rivers of Missouri
