= Interstate 229 (Missouri) =

Highway in Missouri

Interstate 229
- I-229 highlighted in red

Route information
- Auxiliary route of I-29
- Maintained by MoDOT
- Length: 15.027 mi (24.184 km)
- Existed: 1986–present
- NHS: Entire route

Major junctions
- South end: I-29 / US 71 in St. Joseph
- US 59 in St. Joseph; US 36 in St. Joseph
- North end: I-29 / US 59 / US 71 near St. Joseph

Location
- Country: United States
- State: Missouri
- Counties: Buchanan, Andrew

Highway system
- Interstate Highway System; Main; Auxiliary; Suffixed; Business; Future; Missouri State Highway System; Interstate; US; State; Supplemental
← Route 224	→ Route 231

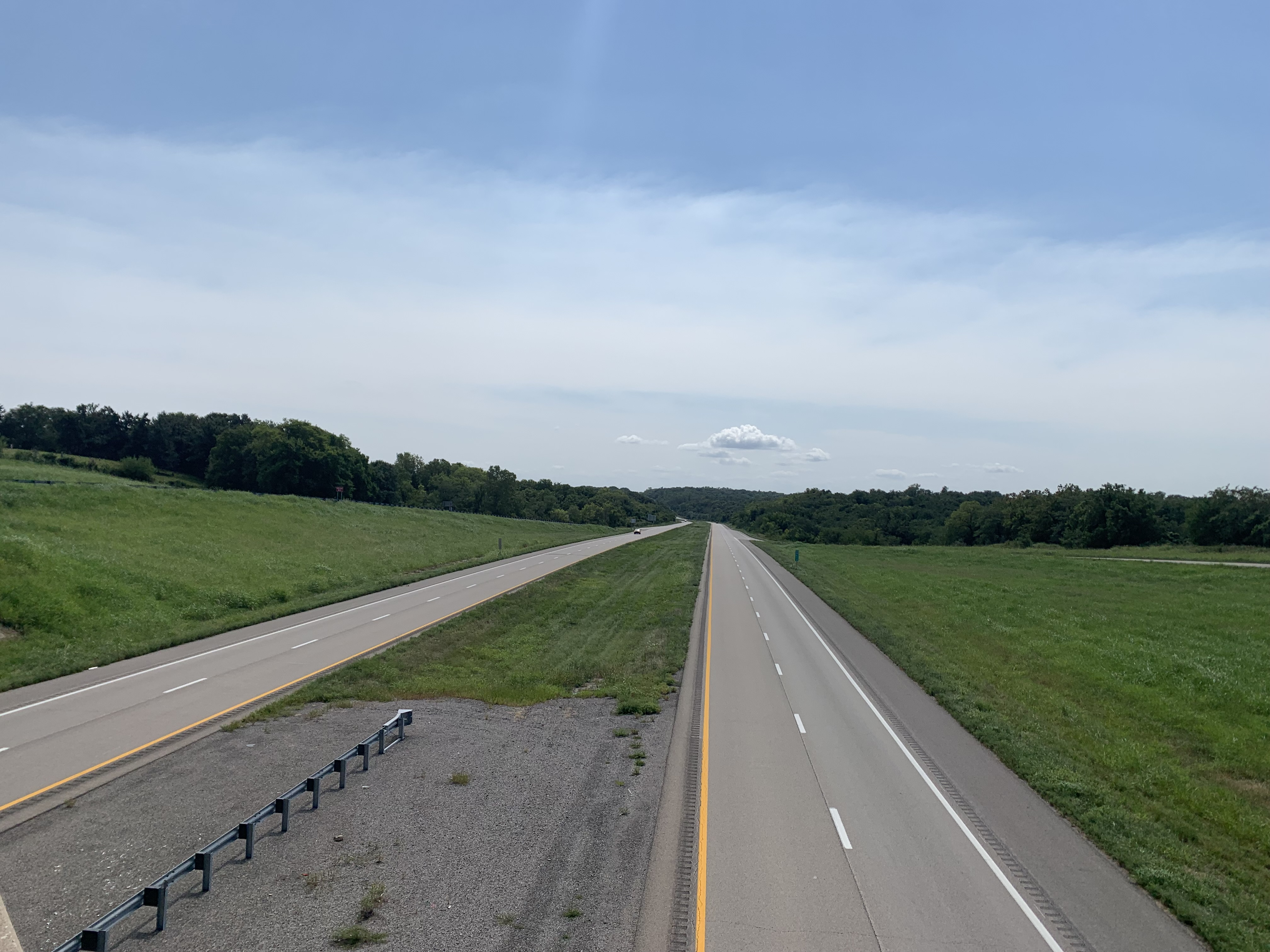
Interstate 229 at Route K bridge

Interstate 229 (I-229) is a 15-mile-long (24 km) auxiliary Interstate Highway that runs through St. Joseph, Missouri. It begins southeast of the city at I-29 and U.S. Route 71 (US 71) and travels to the northwest into the city. In St. Joseph, it runs with US 59. Just north of an interchange with US 36, the two routes travel over a one-mile-long (1.6 km) viaduct on the banks of the Missouri River. The two routes split at the north end of the viaduct. The Interstate ends at another interchange with I-29 and US 71 north of St. Joseph. The viaduct is intended to be demolished and replaced with a surface boulevard, which will de-designate I-229.

The portion that goes through downtown St. Joseph is the second double-decked bridge in the state of Missouri, the other on I-64 in St. Louis, and one of only a few such bridges in the United States and the world.

The Interstate was built in the late 1970s and early 1980s and was intended to draw people into St. Joseph's downtown area. A portion of the historic Robidoux Row, an area of St. Joseph built by the towns founder, was demolished to make way for the viaduct along the Missouri River.

== Route description ==
I-229 begins southeast of St. Joseph at a directional T interchange with I-29 and US 71 in rural Buchanan County. It heads to the north-northwest and almost immediately meets Route A at a half-diamond interchange; in this case, only southbound I-229 traffic can access Route A and Route A traffic can only access northbound I-229. North of the highway is a housing development while there are fields to the south. Another half-diamond interchange provides access to Route 752. Northbound I-229 traffic may exit to reach westbound Route 752. Full access to Route 752 is provided by the next exit, Route 371, known locally as 22nd Street.

As I-229 approaches downtown St. Joseph, it encounters two half-diamond interchanges. The southern interchange, for East Lake Boulevard, provides access to US 59 for northbound traffic. At the northern interchange, for South 6th Street, northbound US 59 joins northbound I-229 while southbound US 59 leaves I-229. The two routes run together northward, where they encounter US 36. Just north of US 36, the northbound I-229/US 59 lanes raise up and are positioned over the southbound lanes.

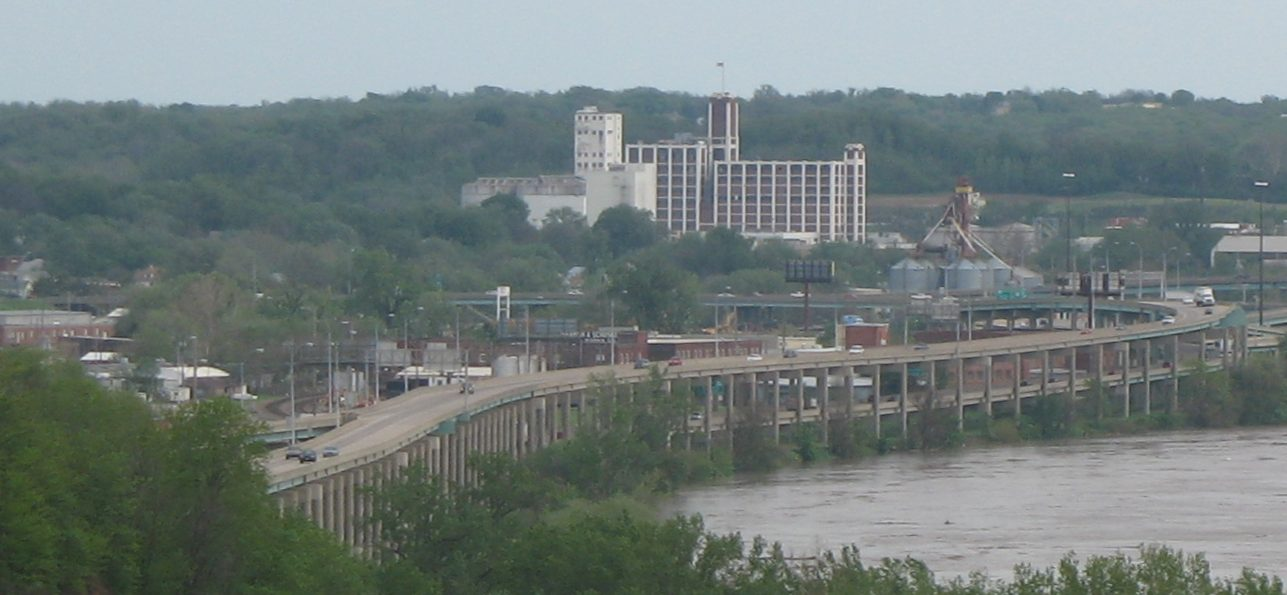
Looking south at the I-229 viaduct and the Missouri River from Wyeth Hill

This viaduct runs along the eastern bank of the Missouri River for just over one mile (1.6 km). At the south end of the viaduct, another half-diamond interchange for Route 759, provides southbound traffic access to westbound US 36 as the main interchange does not provide direct access. At roughly the three-quarter point of the viaduct, two sets of exit and entrance ramps, all of which on the eastside of the structure, connect St. Joseph's central business district to the Interstate Highway.

The viaduct ends at the St. Joseph Avenue interchange, which is also where US 59 leaves I-229. After which, the highway leaves St. Joseph and enters Andrew County. The Route K interchange provides access to Amazonia. The Interstate continues north where it ends at a complex interchange with I-29 and US 71. I-29 runs from the southeast to the northwest, I-229 comes up from the south, and US 71 comes from the southeast with I-29 and exits to the north at the interchange. I-229 traffic that does not exit onto I-29 continues north on US 71. US 59 is signed at the interchange as if it were running along the same line as US 71, but it actually intersects I-29 three miles (4.8 km) southeast of the end of I-229.

== History ==
The Interstate, which was built in the late 1970s and early 1980s (with the southern section from downtown completed in 1979 and the northern section from downtown to the northern portion of I-29 completed in 1986), was intended to revive St. Joseph's downtown which had been seeing its businesses migrate to shopping malls along US 169 (also known as the Belt Highway) about two miles (3.2 km) east of downtown near I-29. I-29 initially had been designed to bypass developed areas of St. Joseph, but its construction spurred development near the Interstate on the city's eastside.

Access to St. Joseph's downtown business district earlier had been via residential streets often on a confusing maze of oneway streets.

The most dramatic and controversial section of the road is a two-level viaduct (with northbound cars on the top) on the westside of downtown, separating the town from the Missouri River. Its construction caused several historic downtown buildings to be torn down, including portions of Robidoux Row (built by the city's founder Joseph Robidoux), and hindered the view of the Missouri River from many downtown buildings.

== Future ==
More than 400 people gave input on 19 different design proposals through an online survey via the Missouri Department of Transportation's (MoDOT) "I-229: Moving Forward" website. Proposals in seven different categories included reconstructing the Interstate at-grade or on slightly elevated structures in floodprone areas; removing the top deck and building another elevated structure next to the existing one; decommissioning the Interstate and using local streets or a scenic parkway through downtown St. Joseph; or routing I-229 into Kansas along a 2,700-foot (820 m) long bridge across the Missouri River.

On November 14, 2019, MoDOT told the City of St. Joseph it had settled on two possible alternatives for the two-level section, both of which would involve its demolition and removing the Interstate designation. According to MoDOT's district planning manager, "Removing the structure and creating a facility that would facilitate local traffic which is what’s going on right now is the best approach moving forward." The St. Joseph Metropolitan Planning Organization's (MPO) technical committee voted down supporting the plans and asked for more information on how MoDOT arrived at its decisions.

City officials have previously discussed the possibility of tearing the viaduct down at the end of its life in 2036. Don Wichern, an area engineer for MoDOT's Northwest Region, said I-229 is the least used Interstate in Missouri. Future plans call for a demolition of I-229 through downtown St. Joseph and to be replaced with a surface boulevard. Even though right of way funding for the project has been allocated for the fiscal year of 2027, no additional funding or timeline has been designated for design or construction. The project will result in a de-designation of I-229.

== Exit list ==
County	Location	mi	km	Exit	Destinations	Notes
Buchanan	Washington Township	0.000	0.000	1	I-29 / US 71 – Council Bluffs, Kansas City	I-29 exit 43; southern terminus; signed as left exit 1A (north) and 1B (south)
Buchanan	Washington Township	0.758	1.220	1C	Route A	Southbound exit and northbound entrance only
Buchanan	Washington Township	1.911	3.075	1D	Route 752	Northbound exit and southbound entrance only
Buchanan	St. Joseph	2.939	4.730	3	Route 371 (South 22nd Street)	
Buchanan	St. Joseph	4.080	6.566	4	East Lake Boulevard	Northbound exit and southbound entrance only
Buchanan	St. Joseph	4.669	7.514	4A	US 59 south (South 6th Street) / Atchison Street	Southern end of US 59 concurrency; southbound exit and northbound entrance only
Buchanan	St. Joseph	5.175– 5.185	8.328– 8.344	4B	US 36 – Hiawatha, Kansas, Cameron	
Buchanan	St. Joseph	5.572	8.967	5	Route 759 to US 36 west	Southbound exit and northbound entrance only
Buchanan	St. Joseph	6.211	9.996	6A	Edmond Street – Central Business District	Northbound exit and southbound entrance only
Buchanan	St. Joseph	6.603	10.626	6A	Felix Street – Central Business District	Southbound exit and northbound entrance only
Buchanan	St. Joseph	6.651	10.704	6B	US 59 north (St. Joseph Avenue)	Northern end of US 59 concurrency; northbound exit and southbound entrance only
Buchanan	St. Joseph	7.670	12.344	7	Highland Avenue	
Andrew	Jefferson Township	11.382	18.318	11	Route K – Amazonia	
Andrew	Jefferson Township	14.422– 14.821	23.210– 23.852	14A, 14C	I-29 / US 71 south – Council Bluffs, Kansas City	I-29 exit 56A
Andrew	Jefferson Township	15.027	24.184	14B	US 71 north – Maryville	I-29 exit 56B; northern terminus
1.000 mi = 1.609 km; 1.000 km = 0.621 mi: Concurrency terminus; Incomplete access
