= Jordan Branch =

Jordan Branch may refer to:

- Jordan Branch, Nova Scotia, a community in the Municipality of the District of Shelburne
- Jordan Branch (Bee Creek tributary), a stream in Missouri
- Jordan Branch (Saint Johns Creek tributary), a stream in Missouri
- Jordan Branch (Sewell Branch tributary), Kent County, Delaware
