= Jordan Branch (Bee Creek tributary) =

Stream in the American state of Missouri

Coordinates: 39°28′45″N 94°48′44″W

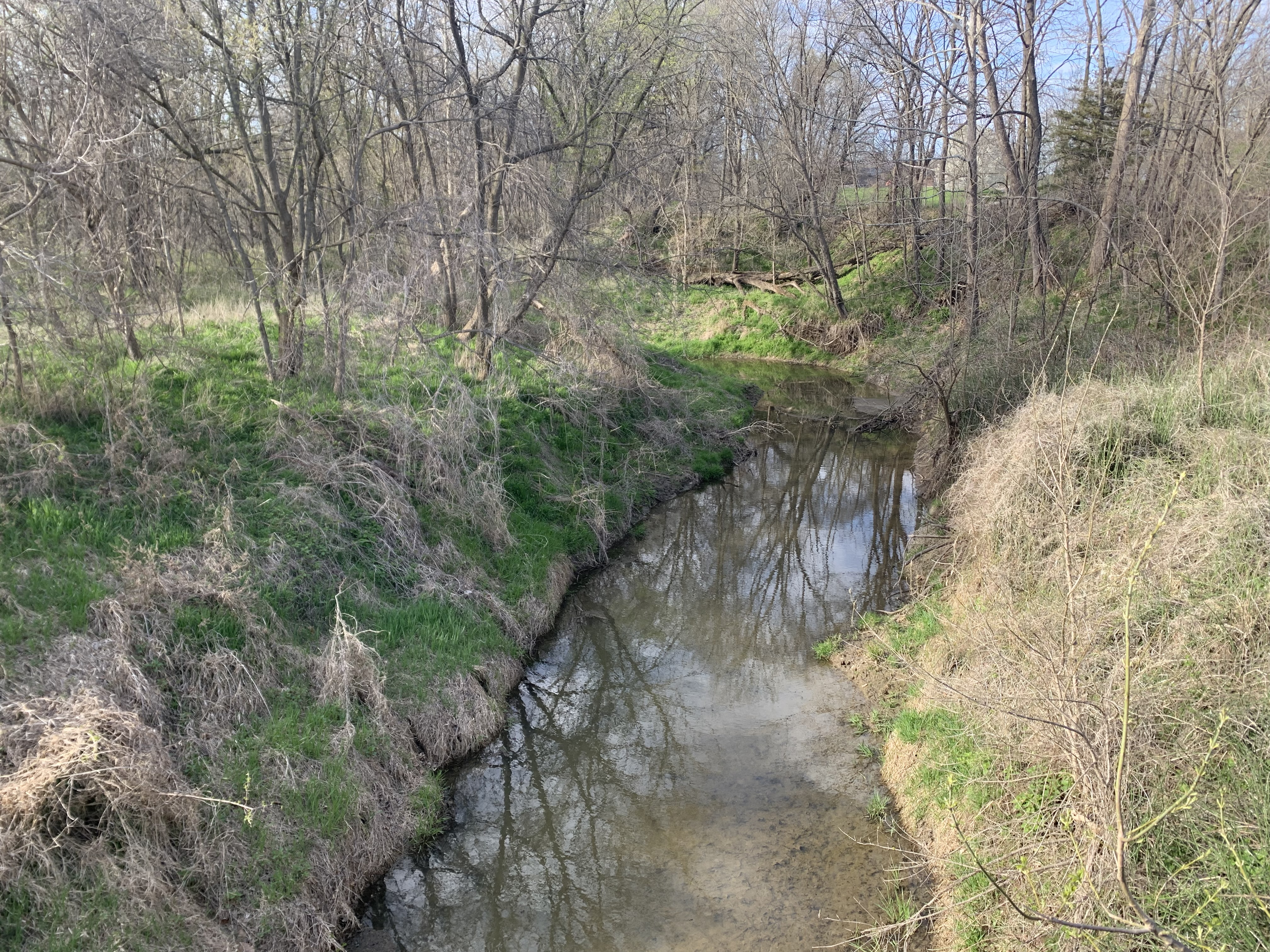
Jordan Branch at Missouri Route H

Jordan Branch is a stream in the U.S. state of Missouri. It is a tributary of Bee Creek.

It headwaters just southwest of Wallace and travels south then southeast over 6 miles until it joins Bee Creek southwest of New Market.

Jordan Branch took its name from a nearby Baptist church of the same name.

There are two named direct tributary, Little Jordan Branch and Lane's Branch.

== See also ==
- List of rivers of Missouri
