= North Oak Trafficway =

Major Road In Northland, Kansas City Missouri

North Oak Trafficway is a major north–south arterial road in Kansas City, North, MO and Gladstone, MO. Its southern terminus is at the city limits of North Kansas City, NE 32nd St., where it breaks off of Missouri Route 9, known as Burlington Road inside North Kansas City. From there, it runs 10.5 miles through Kansas City North, Gladstone, and Oaks, MO. Its northern terminus is Missouri Route 291 also known as NE Cookingham DR near NE 115th St. It serves as the main commercial strip in Gladstone and the surrounding areas. It runs parallel with U.S. 169 for its entire length, which is less than a mile to the west. From its southern terminus to I-29/U.S. 71, it is also known as Missouri Route 283 Ending At I-29. Soon before the road ends it goes over by Missouri Route 152 having an exit to the road

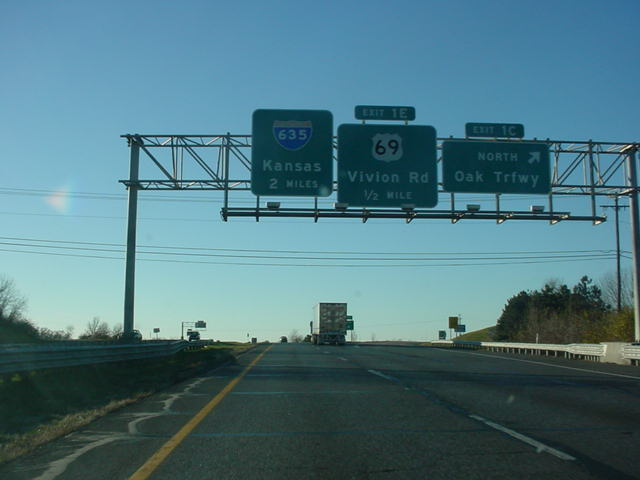
North Oak Trafficway exit on I-29 North

== See also ==
- Missouri Route 283
- U.S. Route 169
- Kansas City, Missouri
- Gladstone, Missouri
