= Frosty Thomas =

American baseball player (1881–1970)

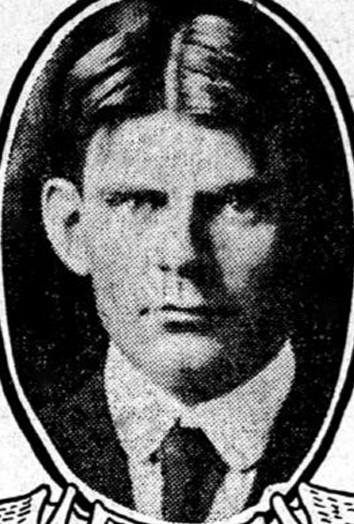
- Pitcher
- Born: May 23, 1881; Faucett, Missouri, U.S.
- Died: March 18, 1970 (aged 88); St. Joseph, Missouri, U.S.
- Batted: Right Threw: Right

MLB debut
- May 1, 1905, for the Detroit Tigers

Last MLB appearance
- May 6, 1905, for the Detroit Tigers

MLB statistics
- Win–loss record: 0–1
- Earned run average: 7.50
- Strikeouts: 5
- Stats at Baseball Reference

Teams
- Detroit Tigers (1905)

Forrest "Frosty" Thomas (May 23, 1881 – March 18, 1970) was an American baseball right-handed pitcher and medical doctor. He played 13 seasons of professional baseball, including two games in Major League Baseball for the Detroit Tigers in May 1905.

== Early years ==
Thomas was born in 1881 in Faucett, Missouri, or Gower, Missouri. He attended Warrensburg Teachers College.

== Professional baseball ==
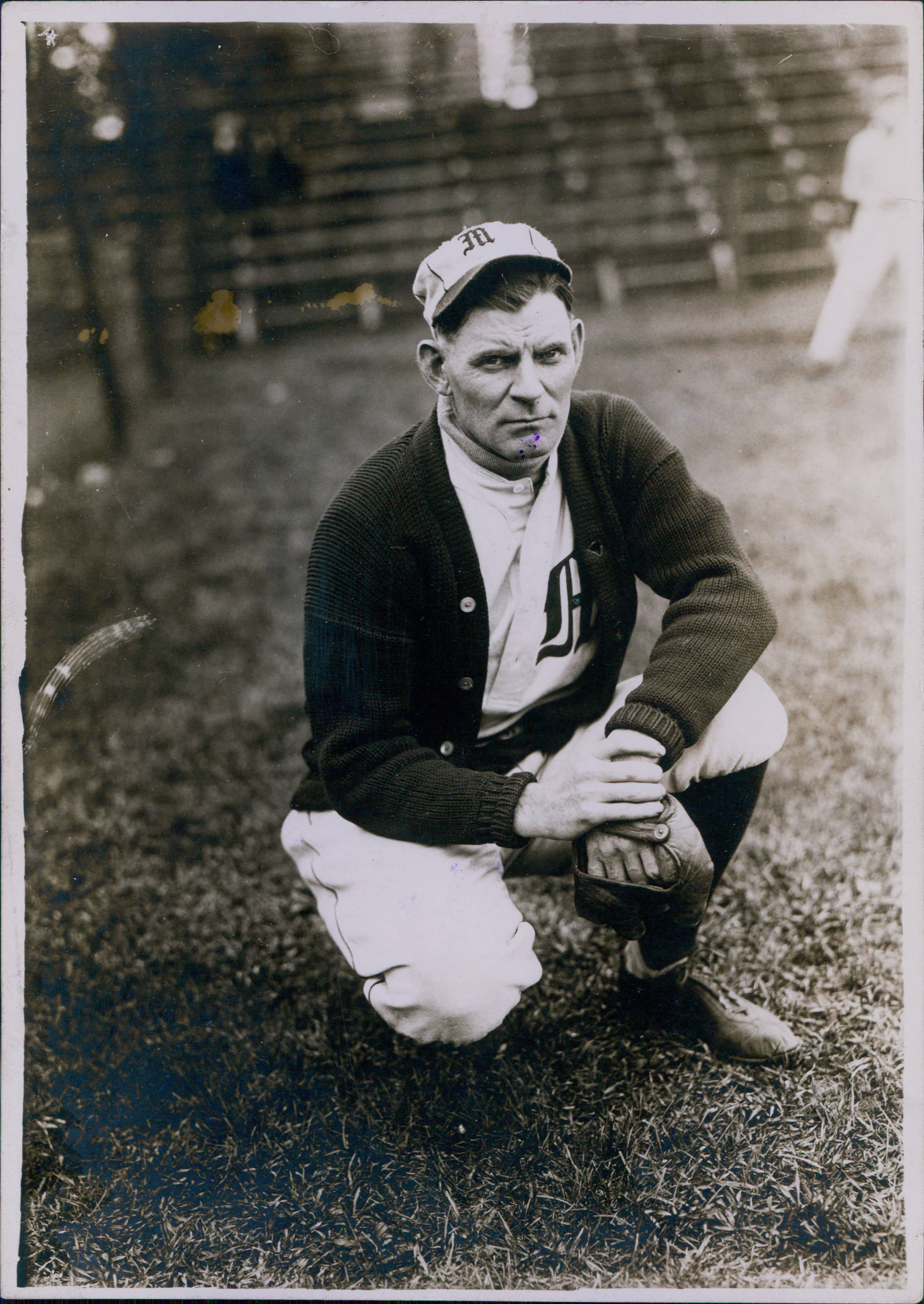
Frosty Thomas with the Minneapolis Millers

He played for the Minneapolis Millers of the Western League from 1903 to 1907, with a brief two-game major league stopover with the Detroit Tigers in May 1905. In 1903, Frosty lost 20 games for the Millers, but the following season he turned things around and had a 21–15 record in 329 innings. The 20-win season got him a shot with the Tigers. He pitched in two games for the Tigers on May 1, 1905, and May 6, 1905. In six innings, he gave up eight runs (five earned), and finished his major league career with a record of 0–1 and an earned run average (ERA) of 7.50. He went hitless in two major league at bats.

Thomas is often credited with inventing the “knuckleball”, having purportedly taught it to Eddie Cicotte in 1905, years before Cicotte popularized the pitch in 1908.

After being released by the Tigers, Frosty returned to Minneapolis where he was 12–11 in 1905, 18–15 in 1906, and 14–16 in 1907. He later played for the Montgomery Senators in the Southern Association (1908-1911), St. Paul Saints (1912), Sioux City Packers (1912), St. Joseph Drummers (1912, 1914-1915), and San Francisco Seals (1913). He compiled a 19–9 record with Montgomery in 1908.

== Later years ==
Thomas was married in 1915 to Ruth Fenton Thomas, and they were married for more than 54 years. He attended Ensworth Medical School and the University of Minnesota Medical School. He lived for the last 43 years of his life in St. Joseph, Missouri, was employed on the staff of St. Joseph State Hospital for approximately 25 years, and served two terms as Buchanan County coroner. He died in St. Joseph in 1970 at age 88. He was buried at Memorial Park Cemetery in St. Joseph.
