= Bee Creek =

Bee Creek may refer to:

- Bee Creek (Elk Fork Salt River tributary), a stream in Missouri
- Bee Creek (Missouri River tributary), a stream in Missouri
