= Missouri Route 371 =

State highway in Missouri, U.S.

Route 371
- MO 371 highlighted in red

Route information
- Maintained by MoDOT
- Length: 24.086 mi (38.763 km)

Major junctions
- South end: I-29 / US 71 / Route 273 in Tracy
- Route 116 near Wallace
- North end: Route 752 in St. Joseph

Location
- Country: United States
- State: Missouri
- Counties: Buchanan, Platte

Highway system
- Missouri State Highway System; Interstate; US; State; Supplemental
| ← Route 370 | → Route 376 |

Route 371 is a highway in western Missouri. Its southern terminus is at Route 273 north of Tracy. Its northern terminus is at Route 752 in St. Joseph. It is a former alignment of U.S. Route 71 (US 71).

== Route description ==
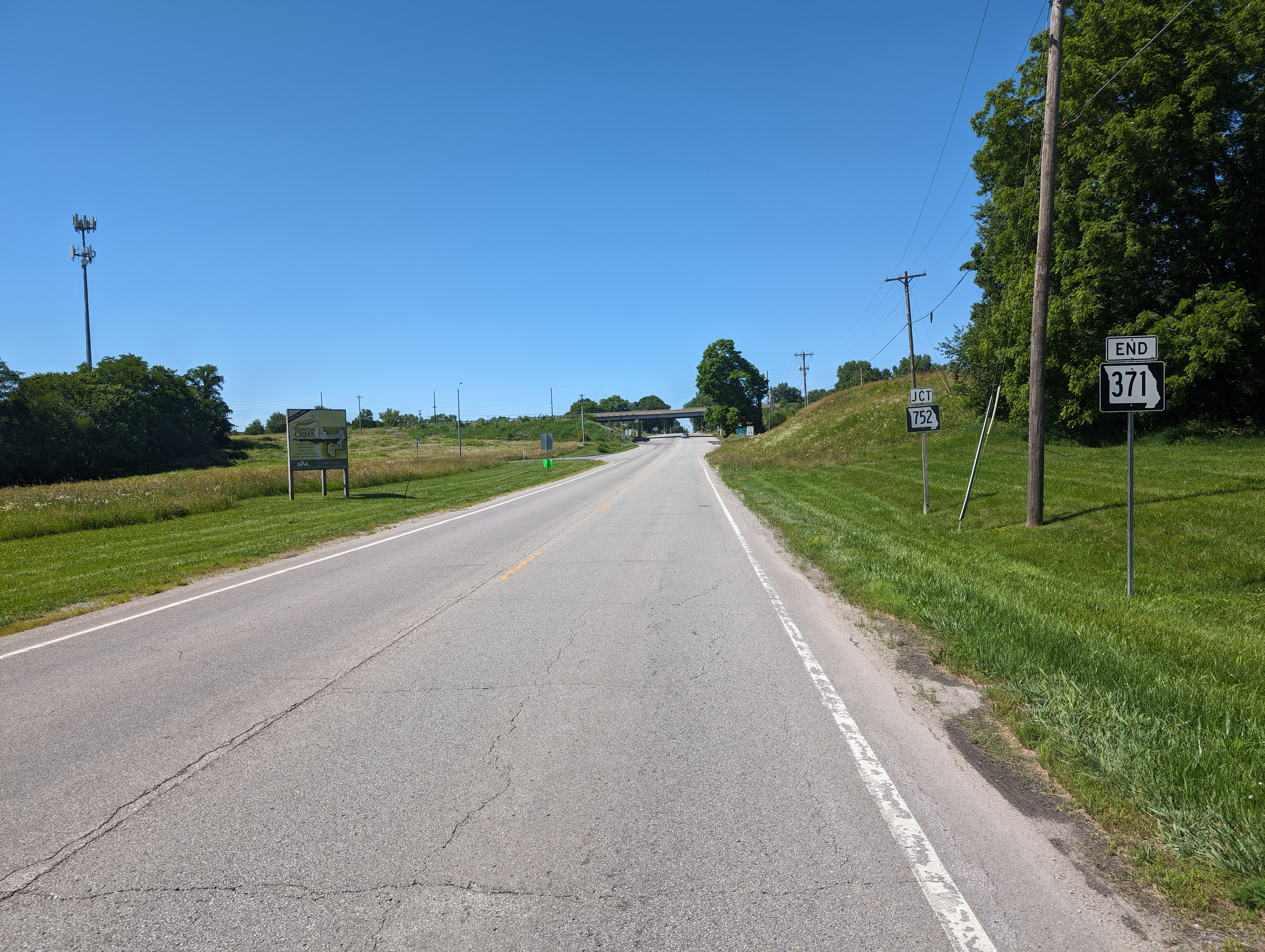
The northern terminus of route 371

Route 371 is a highway that begins in St. Joseph, Missouri and ends in Tracy, north of Platte City. It begins at an intersection with Route 752. After this point, the highway stays mostly parallel and relatively close to I-29/US 71 It then intersects with Route H and shortly after Route A. Continuing south, it passes through Faucett on the west side. Afterward, it intersects with Route 116. then continues south until it reaches New Market. It then continues southerly and passes by Guy B Park Conservation Area and Platte Ridge Park. It then intersects with Route 273 and shortly after ends at an interchange with I-29/US 71.

== History ==
Previously, the route started farther north at Business Route I-29, before travelling southward past an interchange with Interstate 229, before reaching the interchange with Route 752.

== Major intersections ==
| County | Location | mi | km | Destinations | Notes |
|---|---|---|---|---|---|
| Platte | Tracy | 0.000 | 0.000 | I-29 / US 71 – St. Joseph, Kansas City Route 273 begins | Southern end of Route 273 overlap; exit 20 |
| Platte | Tracy | 0.231 | 0.372 | Route 273 north – Tracy | Northern end of Route 273 overlap |
| Platte | Weston Township | 5.245 | 8.441 | Route U east to I-29 – Camden Point | |
| Platte | Green Township | 8.604 | 13.847 | Route H west – Weston | Southern end of Route H overlap |
| Platte | Green Township | 9.698 | 15.607 | Route H east to I-29 – Dearborn | Northern end of Route H overlap |
| Buchanan | Crawford Township | 12.787 | 20.579 | Route 116 to US 169 – Rushville | |
| Buchanan | Faucett | 15.786 | 25.405 | Route DD east to I-29 | |
| Buchanan | Crawford Township | 16.662 | 26.815 | Route A north – St. Joseph | |
| Buchanan | Center Township | 18.469 | 29.723 | Route H east | |
| Buchanan | Center Township | 18.854 | 30.343 | Route CC south – Taos | |
| Buchanan | St. Joseph | 24.033– 24.086 | 38.677– 38.763 | Route 752 to US 59 | |
1.000 mi = 1.609 km; 1.000 km = 0.621 mi: Concurrency terminus

== See also ==
- List of state highways in Missouri
