= Roys Branch =

Stream in Missouri, U.S.

Coordinates: 39°46′40″N 94°52′25″W

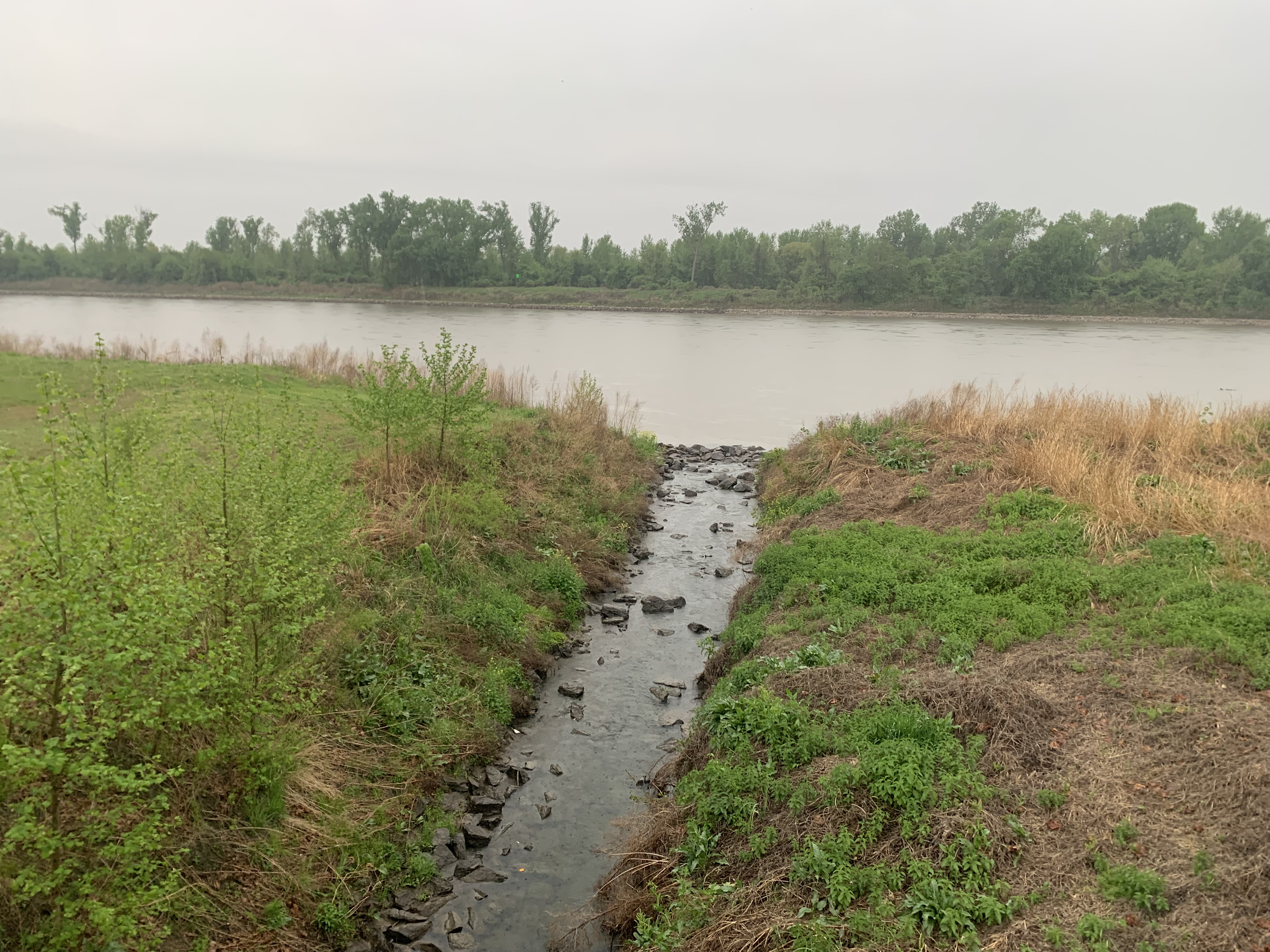
Roys Branch at the Remington Nature Center pedestrian bridge in St. Joseph

Roys Branch is a stream in St. Joseph, Washington Township, Buchanan County in the U.S. state of Missouri.

Roys Branch was named after John B. Roy, an early citizen.

== See also ==
- Tributaries of the Missouri River
- List of rivers of Missouri
