= Missouri Route 283 =

Former state highway in Missouri, U.S.

Route 283

Route information
- Maintained by MoDOT
- Length: 2.167 mi (3.487 km)

Major junctions
- South end: Route 9 in North Kansas City
- North end: I-29 / US 71 in Kansas City

Location
- Country: United States
- State: Missouri

Highway system
- Missouri State Highway System; Interstate; US; State; Supplemental
| ← US 275 | → Route 291 |

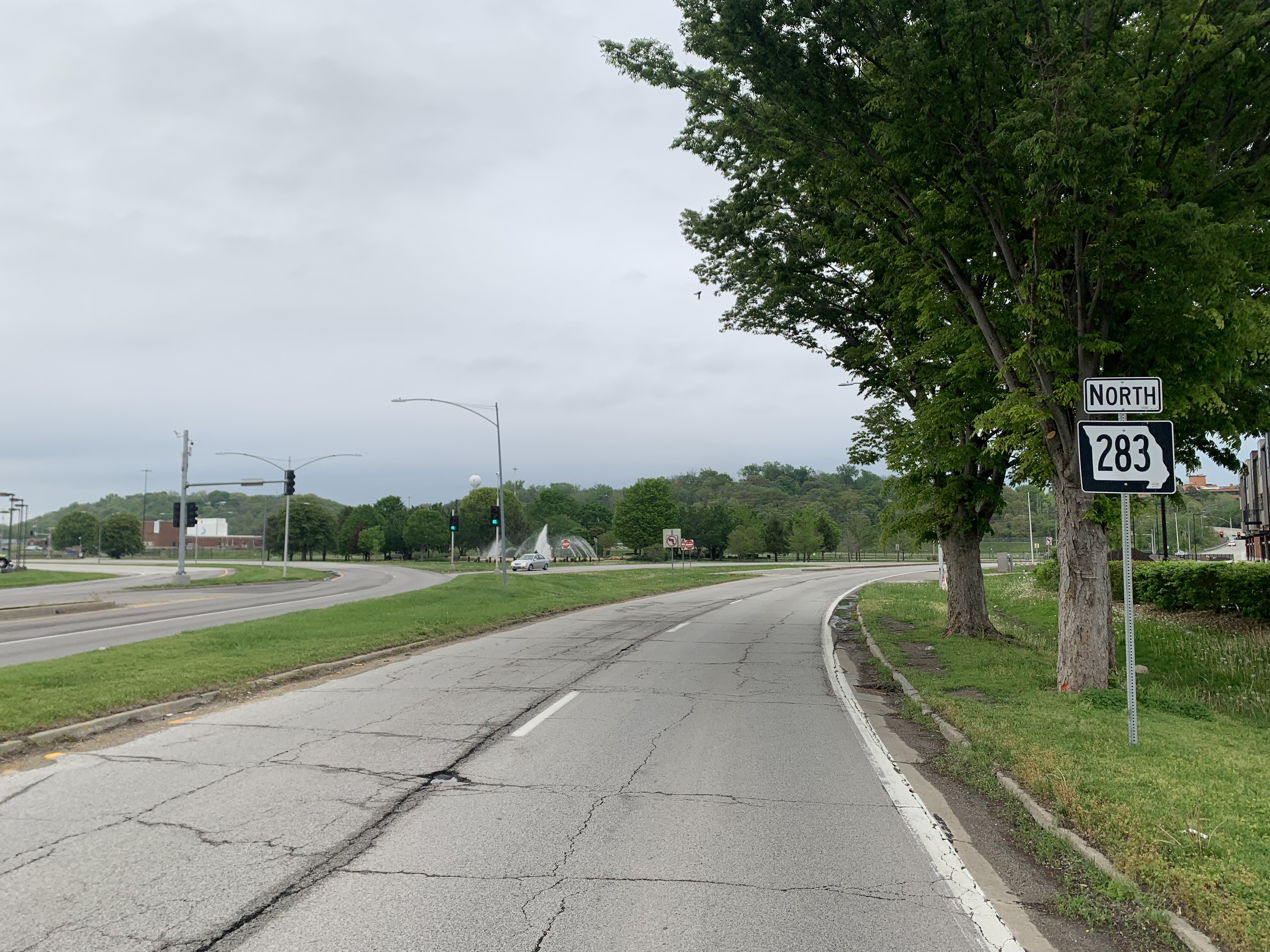
Southern terminus of Route 283 in North Kansas City

Route 283 was a short highway in the Kansas City, Missouri regional area. Its northern terminus was at Interstate 29 (I-29) and U.S. Route 71 (US 71) in Kansas City; its southern terminus was at Route 9 at the northern city limit of North Kansas City. It was known locally as North Oak Trafficway.

== Route description ==
Route 283 began at a fork from Route 9 northbound (Burlington Avenue) in North Kansas City. The two routes forked away from one another, with Route 283, the North Oak Trafficway, crossing Northwest 32nd Avenue as a four-lane divided highway. North of Northwest 32nd, Route 283's four lanes came back together and bent northward over a creek as it entered Water Works Park along the southbound side. The route headed due north, becoming commercial northbound and residential southbound. This changed to a long commercial district in Kansas City before intersecting with Northeast Briarcliff Road/Northeast 42nd Street. At that point, the four-lane highway returned to a mixed residential/business stretch until Northeast 46th Street. After Northeast 46th, Route 283 entered an interchange with I-29 and US 71, where the designation terminated at ramps just south of US 69 (Northeast Vivion Road) and Anita B. Gorman Park.

== Junction list ==
The entire route was in Clay County.

| Location | mi | km | Destinations | Notes |
|---|---|---|---|---|
| North Kansas City | 0.000 | 0.000 | Route 9 (Burlington Avenue) | Southern terminus of Route 283. |
| Kansas City | 2.167 | 3.487 | I-29 / US 71 | Northern terminus of Route 283. Exit 1C (Interstate 29 / U.S. Route 71) |
1.000 mi = 1.609 km; 1.000 km = 0.621 mi
