= Truman Road =

Road in Missouri

- Location within Missouri
- Former name: 15th Street
- Namesake: Harry S. Truman
- Maintained by: MoDOT, City of Kansas City, City of Independence
- Location: Kansas City, Missouri, Independence, Missouri, Jackson County, Missouri
- Coordinates: 39°5′38.6″N 94°25′23.8″W
- Major junctions: I-435; Route 12 (concurrent east of I-435)

Truman Road, originally 15th Street, is a major east/west road located in Jackson County, Missouri. Its original numerical designation is common in the street grid of Kansas City, Missouri. On January 20, 1949, 15th Street was renamed in honor of Harry S. Truman, the 33rd U.S. President, because it passes east through his hometown of Independence. This dual naming persists in planning documents and local references. It serves Kansas City and Independence, and eastern unincorporated Jackson County.

== Geography ==
The road's western end is at Broadway Boulevard and I-670 in downtown Kansas City. This critical juncture integrates it directly into the planning and function of the downtown freeway loop, such as the proposed South Loop Park aimed at capping I-670. Its eastern end reaches the Jackson/Lafayette County line, where it continues as Route FF, north of Oak Grove.

Truman Road goes east from Kansas City, past Interstate 435 to follow Missouri Route 12. This section was originally named Blue Avenue, after the Blue River and the Blue Summit unincorporated community it went through. It continues to an intersection with Spring Street on the Independence Square. Along this part of Truman Road are Van Horn High School, the Maywood Business District, and the Harry S. Truman National Historic Site.

East of Missouri Route 291 in Independence, it intersects with Missouri Route 78/Lake City-Buckner Road and includes a bridge that crosses over the Little Blue River. Due to planned extensions of Jackson Drive and the Little Blue Parkway north of 39th Street, along with future development, this section of Truman Road is slated for upgrades, including widening it from two lanes to four. This planned expansion contrasts with efforts further west along the corridor, where road diets and multimodal enhancements are being implemented or considered.

== History ==
The segment of Truman Road east of Missouri Route 291 in Independence, was originally called Spring Branch Road, named after a nearby creek. Historically, 15th Street, Blue Avenue, and Spring Branch Road were later renamed Van Horn Road. This was to recognize Robert T. Van Horn for having purchased the weekly newspaper The Enterprise in 1855 (later known as The Kansas City Journal), serving as postmaster of Kansas City from 1857 to 1861, and being the sixth mayor of Kansas City for three terms in 1861, 1863, and 1864.

On January 20, 1949, it was renamed Truman Road, and its ribbon-cutting ceremony was on December 15, 1953, which published a declaration that "Truman Road, representing a symbol of progress and a citadel of freedom, must be magnificently beautiful and rainbow colorful." The progression of names, from the geographical to the local and presidential figures, mirrors the area's growth and integration into broader regional and national contexts.

The Truman Road corridor is served by two principal tax exempt entities and is serviced by the City of Kansas City, Missouri, with other sub-organizational entities in sections along the corridor. The Truman Road Community Improvement District (CID) is a 501(c)(4) non-profit dedicated to investing in community infrastructure and improvements along the corridor as a sub-governmental entity largely tasked with common areas in or surrounding East Truman Road.
