= Missouri Route 752 =

State highway in Missouri, U.S.

Route 752

Route information
- Maintained by MoDOT
- Length: 3.113 mi (5.010 km)

Major junctions
- West end: US 59 / Route U in Saint Joseph
- Route 371 in Saint Joseph
- East end: I-229 in Saint Joseph

Location
- Country: United States
- State: Missouri
- Counties: Buchanan

Highway system
- Missouri State Highway System; Interstate; US; State; Supplemental
← Route 744	→ Route 759

Route 752 is a short state highway in the city of St. Joseph, in Buchanan County, Missouri. The route runs for 3.113 miles (5.010 km) through the southern portion of St. Joseph. The route begins at an intersection with U.S. Route 59 (US 59; Lake Avenue) and heads eastward as Alabama Street, East Hyde Park Avenue, and Mason Road. The route crosses an interchange with Route 371 (South 22nd Street) about two miles (3.2 km) in before ending at exit 1D of Interstate 229 (I-229), where eastbound Route 752 merges into the interstate's southbound lanes.

== Route description ==
Route 752 begins at an intersection with US 59 and Route U (Lake Avenue) in the city of St. Joseph. The route progresses eastward as a divided boulevard known as Alabama Street through a long stretch of residences until the intersection with Carnegie Street, where the two roads merge back together. The surroundings remain the same as Route 752 continues, curving from the east to southeast after an intersection with King Hill Road. At the intersection with East Hyde Park Avenue, the Alabama Street moniker ends and the name switches to East Hyde Park Avenue. On the southern side of the highway, the route remains residential, but businesses begin to form on the northern side as Route 752 intersects with Southwestern Parkway, which becomes two lanes at this intersection. The four lane alignment of East Hyde Park Avenue continues eastward until after the intersection with South 7th Street, where Route 752 turns along Mason Road and East Hyde Park Avenue heads southward as a two lane road near Hyde Park. Route 752 remains four lanes through St. Joseph, until approaching an interchange with Route 371 (South 22nd Street), where the highway crosses over Route 371 as a two lane bridge. After the interchange, Route 752 bends northward as a two-lane highway with no name until approaching an interchange with I-229, where the eastbound alignment of Route 752 merges into the southbound alignment of I-229. This serves as the terminus of Route 752.

== Junction list ==
The entire route is in Saint Joseph, Buchanan County.

mi	km	Destinations	Notes
0.000	0.000	US 59 / Route U (Lake Avenue)	Western terminus of Route 752
2.129	3.426	Route 371	Interchange
3.113	5.010	I-229	Eastern terminus of Route 752; exit 1D (Interstate 229)
1.000 mi = 1.609 km; 1.000 km = 0.621 mi
