= Crawford Township, Buchanan County, Missouri =

Township in Buchanan County, Missouri, U.S.

Crawford Township
- Township
- Coordinates: 39°34′26″N 94°48′51″W
- Country: United States
- State: Missouri
- County: Buchanan

Area
  - Total: 35.23 sq mi (91.2 km^{2})
  - Land: 35.12 sq mi (91.0 km^{2})
  - Water: 0.11 sq mi (0.28 km^{2}) 0.31%
- Elevation: 1,047 ft (319 m)

Population (2020)
  - Total: 884
  - Density: 25.2/sq mi (9.7/km^{2})
- FIPS code: 29-02117110
- GNIS feature ID: 766339

Crawford Township is a township in Buchanan County, Missouri, United States. At the 2020 census, its population was 884.

Crawford Township was organized in the late 1830s and named after William Crawford.

A sizable hamlet, called Jeannette, was located in the southwest of the township along the Chicago, Rock Island, and Pacific Railroad southeast of De Kalb.

== Geography ==
Crawford Township covers an area of 35.29 square miles (91.4 km^{2}) and contains no incorporated settlements. It contains seven cemeteries: Antioch, Judy, Richardson, Turner, Union, Williams and Willis.

== Transportation ==
Crawford Township contains one airport or landing strip, Farris Strip Airport.

The following highways travel through the township:

- Interstate 29
- U.S. Route 71
- Route 116
- Route 371
- Route A
- Route CC
- Route DD
- Route V
- Route Y
