= Heart of America Bridge =

Bridge in United States of America

Sam Graves Heart of America Bridge
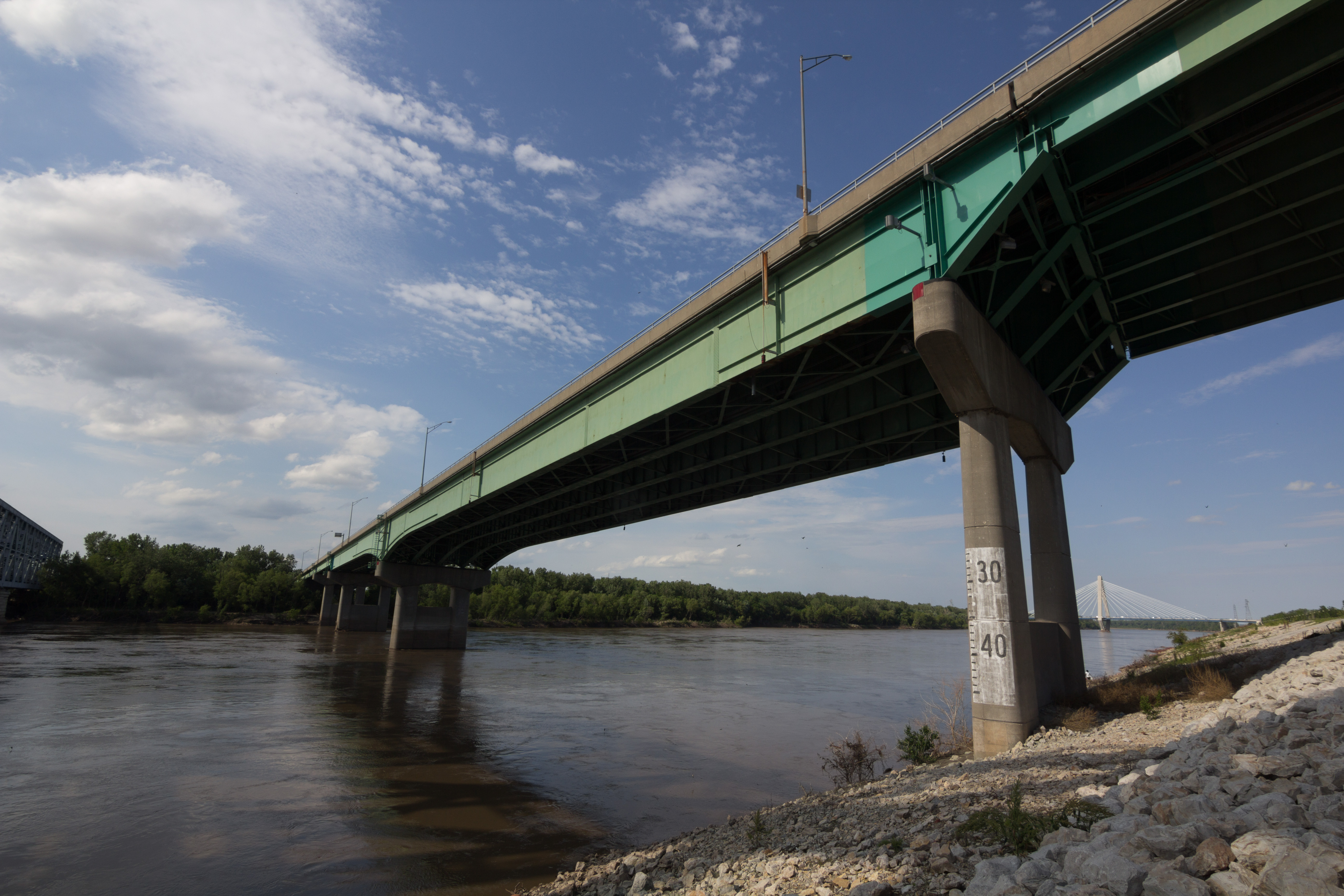
- The Sam Graves Heart of America Bridge, June 2013
- Coordinates: 39.116751°N 94.578778°W
- Carries: Route 9
- Crosses: Missouri River
- Locale: Kansas City, Missouri to North Kansas City, Missouri

Characteristics
- Design: Girder Bridge

History
- Opened: 1986; 40 years ago

Location
- Interactive map of Sam Graves Heart of America Bridge

The Sam Graves Heart of America Bridge is a vehicular girder bridge over the Missouri River, in Kansas City, Missouri. It carries Route 9. It is the vehicular replacement for the upper level of the ASB Bridge, and runs next to it a few hundred yards downstream. It was opened in 1987. It was originally named the Heart of America Bridge.

In September 2010, a bi-directional bicycle and pedestrian path to separate from motorized traffic, was opened on the northbound side. It is the first separated pedestrian crossing of the Missouri River in the Kansas City metropolitan area. The Engineer of Record for that project is Burns & McDonnell Engineering Company.

In 2025, the bridge was renamed the Sam Graves Heart of America Bridge to honor Chairman Sam Graves. Graves represented Missouri's Sixth Congressional District in the United States Congress from 2001-2026 after serving in the Missouri House of Representatives and Missouri Senate. Graves served as the Chairman of the U.S. House of Representatives Transportation and Infrastructure Committee from 2023-2027. https://documents.house.mo.gov/billtracking/bills251/sumpdf/HB1394I.pdf

== See also ==
- List of crossings of the Missouri River
