= Weston Township, Platte County, Missouri =

Township in Platte County, Missouri, U.S.

Weston Township
- Township
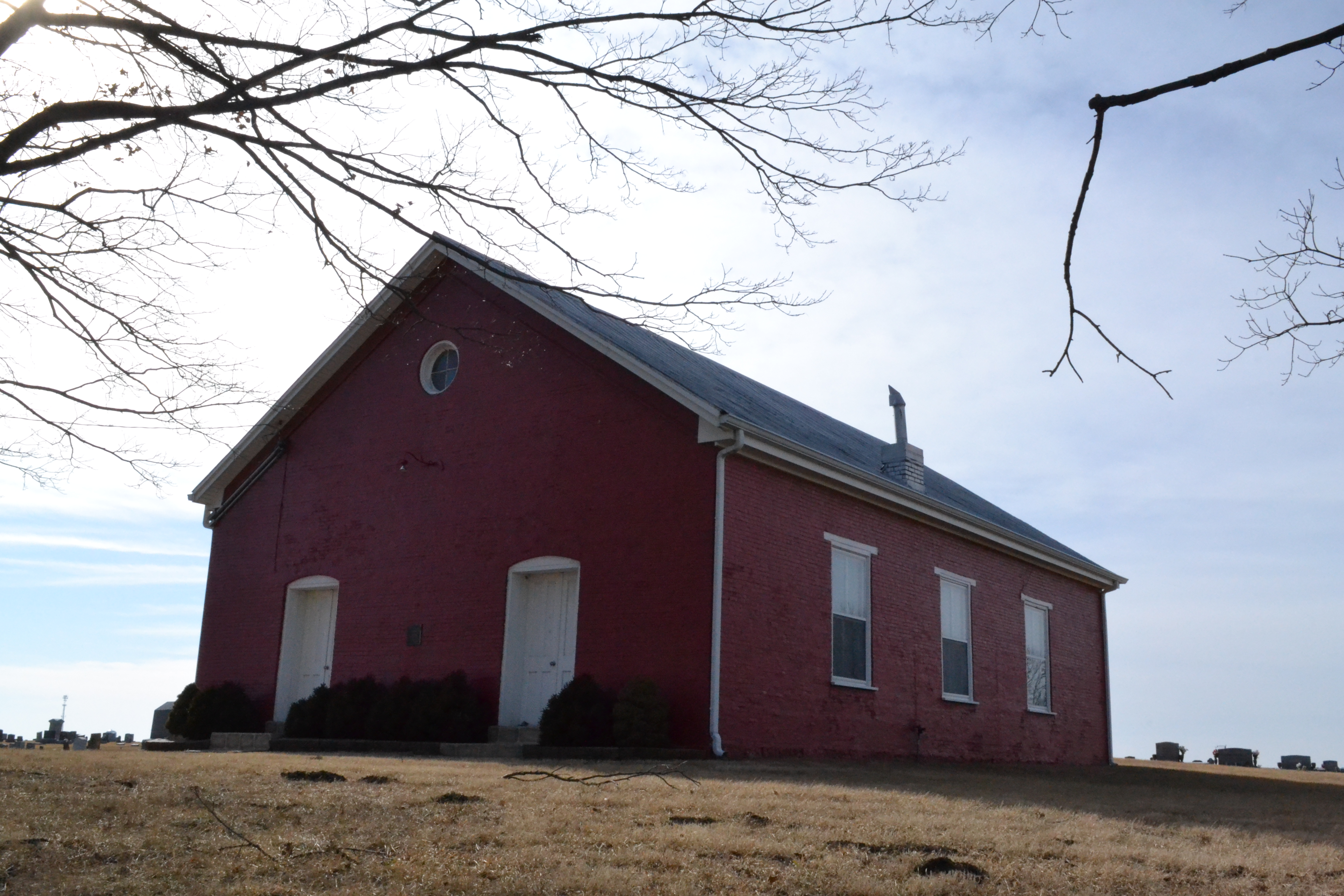
- Pleasant Ridge United Baptist Church in eastern Weston Township

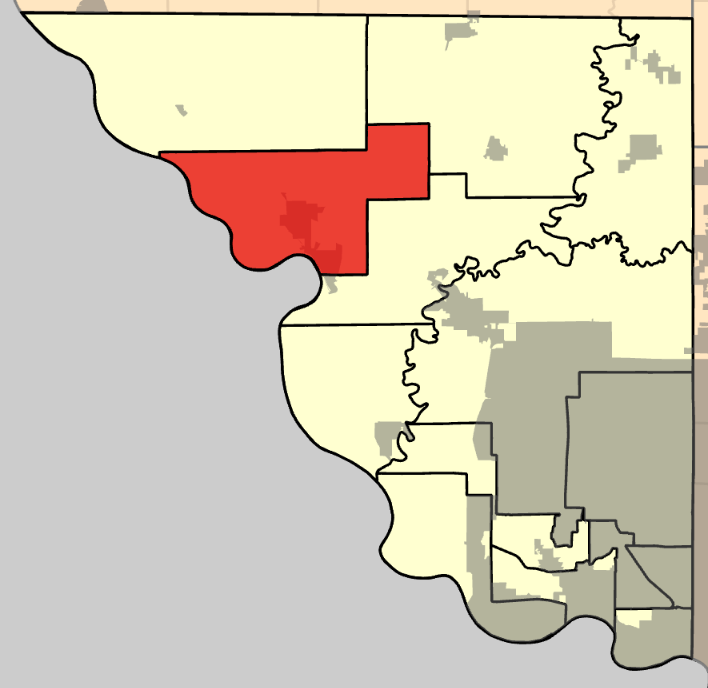
- Coordinates: 39°26′07″N 94°53′42″W
- Country: United States
- State: Missouri
- County: Platte

Area
  - Total: 37.66 sq mi (97.5 km^{2})
  - Land: 36.94 sq mi (95.7 km^{2})
  - Water: 0.72 sq mi (1.9 km^{2}) 1.91%
- Elevation: 827 ft (252 m)

Population (2020)
  - Total: 2,444
  - Density: 66.2/sq mi (25.6/km^{2})
- FIPS code: 29-16578874
- GNIS feature ID: 767209

Weston Township is a township in Platte County, Missouri, United States. At the 2020 census, its population was 2,444.

Weston Township was erected in 1840, taking its name from the community of Weston, Missouri. Most of Weston Bend State Park is located within this township, with a small portion in neighboring Fair Township.
