= Luminary Park =

Urban park in Kansas City, Missouri

- Interactive map of Luminary Park
- Location: Kansas City, Missouri, U.S.
- Coordinates: 39°05′46″N 94°34′57″W
- Area: 5.5 acres (2.2 ha)
- Designer: OJB Landscape Architecture, BNIM, HNTB
- Owner: City of Kansas City
- Operator: Planned non-profit entity
- Status: In development

Luminary Park is a planned 5.5-acre (2.2 ha) public park under construction in Kansas City, Missouri. The park's surface rests on a structural deck, or lid, to be built atop a four-block section of the below-grade Interstate 670 (I-670) to create what its designers describe as a multi-functional, highly programmed urban green space. Its stated purpose is to reconnect the city's Central Business District and the Crossroads Arts District, to remediate a significant urban divide created by the highway's construction during the controversial nationwide Urban Renewal era of the late 1960s.

Project leaders estimate the total cost between US$200 million and $217.2 million. It is financed through a public-private partnership that combines federal, state, and municipal funding with private contributions. The project is a collaboration between the City of Kansas City, the Downtown Council of Kansas City, and Port KC. It was designed by the same company that did Klyde Warren Park in Dallas, with plans for programmed event spaces, inclusive play areas, and gardens.

From 2022 to 2025, the project was temporarily named South Loop Park, South Loop Project, or South Loop Link. It was officially named Roy Blunt Luminary Park on April 11, 2025, after former U.S. Senator Roy Blunt, for his role in securing $28.6 million in federal funding. The project was cleared for construction after a federal environmental review concluded with a Finding of No Significant Impact. An original goal to finish the park before Kansas City hosted 2026 FIFA World Cup matches was delayed by the regulatory process, and the revised plan focuses on completing the foundational deck structure before the event.

== Development ==
The park reflects a shift in urban design toward mitigating the harms of mid-20th-century, automobile-centric infrastructure. The section of I-670 that the design covers was built in 1968, a product of the Urban Renewal era, that prioritized building freeways through areas designated as "blighted" to reduce land acquisition costs. The construction created a trench approximately 20 to 30 ft (6.1 to 9.1 m) deep known as the "Kansas City Cut", establishing a formidable barrier that eliminated an estimated 100 blocks of the city's urban fabric. Proponents frame the park as an act of restorative urbanism intended to "restitch" and "reweave the urban fabric".

A 2017 study commissioned by the Downtown Council from the engineering firm HNTB helped prove the project's viability. It lowered the estimated cost at the time from $175 million to $139 million and projected a nearly 4-to-1 return on investment. A separate economic impact study from that year, cited in the project's Environmental Assessment, estimated the park could generate approximately $490 million in economic benefits in its first 20 years. The park is also a component of the "Beyond the Loop" study, a long-term reimagining of the entire downtown freeway system that completed an initial phase in 2018.

The project was formally introduced to the public in 2022. A critical regulatory phase began on September 27, 2023, with the start of the National Environmental Policy Act (NEPA) review. This required a detailed Environmental Assessment conducted with the Missouri Department of Transportation (MoDOT) and the Federal Highway Administration (FHWA) to evaluate potential effects on traffic, air quality, and the community. Public outreach included a key meeting on February 13, 2025, at the Kirk Family YMCA to present the assessment's results. The process concluded when the FHWA issued a Finding of No Significant Impact (FONSI), giving the federal clearance necessary for the project to proceed.

The park was named for Roy Blunt, a Republican who represented Missouri in the United States Senate from 2011 to 2023 and had served in the United States House of Representatives and as Missouri's Secretary of State. He secured about $28.6 million in federal funding. Kansas City Mayor Quinton Lucas called the honor a fitting tribute to a "true friend to Kansas City". In a statement, Blunt said the park "will reconnect communities and be another place that helps define Kansas City as one of America's great cities". According to project organizers, the "Luminary Park" name is intended to celebrate "the brilliance in the heart of our city of lights".

=== Design ===
The park is to occupy 5.5 acres (2.2 ha) and some PortKC documents claim 6 acres (2.4 ha), above I-670, bounded by Grand Boulevard to the east, Wyandotte Street to the west, and the two Truman Road frontage roads. This positions the park as a central link between the Central Business District, the Power & Light District, the Crossroads Arts District, the Kansas City Convention Center, and the T-Mobile Center.

The design is a collaborative effort led by OJB Landscape Architecture as landscape architect, the Kansas City-based firm BNIM as project architect, and HNTB providing engineering. Project leaders have noted that the decision to hire OJB, the same firm that designed Klyde Warren Park in Dallas, was a strategic choice based on a successful precedent. Sustainability is a central tenet of the design, which includes native plantings to create pollinator habitats, biofiltration systems like rain gardens to manage stormwater, and hundreds of new trees to mitigate the urban heat island effect.

Through public feedback, project leaders developed a vision for a versatile "community front yard". Plans call for a large open lawn, ornamental gardens, shaded seating areas, and an inclusive, ADA-compliant playground. A dedicated dog park, which may include a "bark bar", is also in the plans. For cultural events, the design includes a performance pavilion, spaces for temporary public art, and areas for pop-up markets. Essential facilities include public restrooms, public Wi-Fi, and potentially a restaurant or food hall. A civic and children's education center is part of the long-term vision. The park is intended to host a robust calendar of programming, including health and fitness classes and cultural festivals.

=== Construction ===
Construction is divided into two primary phases. The first involves building the structural deck, which includes erecting support columns, placing massive concrete and steel beams, and installing ventilation and safety systems for the highway tunnel below. The second phase is the construction of the park itself. As of mid-2025, the design was at the 60% completion mark. A joint venture of Clarkson Construction and JE Dunn Construction was selected as the general contractor through a "Best Value" approach that considered qualifications and strategy.

The 2026 FIFA World Cup heavily influenced the project's timeline, serving as a catalyst for fundraising and political will. However, the initial goal to complete the park by the event became infeasible because of the lengthy federal environmental review. The revised strategy is to complete the foundational deck before the tournament begins, pause work during the event, and resume park construction afterward.

=== Funding and management ===
The park's financing is a combination of public and private contributions. Federal funding includes the $28.6 million appropriation secured by Senator Blunt. The State of Missouri has committed approximately $71.4 million, which includes a MoDOT grant, state budget appropriations, and a state tax credit. The City of Kansas City contributed over $41.4 million. As of early 2023, private fundraising had secured over $45 million. This includes a lead gift of $10 million from H&R Block and its associated foundations.

A dedicated non-profit entity is planned to oversee the park's long-term operations, maintenance, and programming.

== Reception ==
Proponents project the park to be a significant economic catalyst, spurring adjacent private investment, increasing property values, and creating jobs in construction and park operations. The project's primary stated social goal is to physically "restitch" the urban fabric divided by the highway. Its environmental goals include providing needed green space, reducing traffic noise, and improving air quality. Project leaders also envision it as an "outdoor classroom" for local schools.

The project has broad support, but some transportation advocates and residents have expressed concern about the potential closure of north–south streets that currently cross I-670. Critics argue that closing streets like Walnut or Baltimore without a thorough traffic analysis could disrupt the downtown grid and funnel more traffic onto Main Street, which is a critical corridor for the KC Streetcar, potentially impeding its operations.
