= Missouri Route 759 =

State highway in Missouri, U.S.

Route 759

Route information
- Maintained by MoDOT
- Length: 2.126 mi (3.421 km)

Major junctions
- South end: Southwest Lower Lake Road in St. Joseph
- US 36 in St. Joseph
- North end: I-229 / US 59 in St. Joseph

Location
- Country: United States
- State: Missouri
- Counties: Buchanan

Highway system
- Missouri State Highway System; Interstate; US; State; Supplemental
← Route 752	→ Route 763

Route 759 is a short state highway in the city of St. Joseph, in Buchanan County, Missouri. The route runs for about 2.126 miles (3.421 km) under the monikers of Stockyards Expressway and South Second Street beginning at an intersection with West Florence Road. The southern terminus of Route 759 is at an at-grade intersection with Southwest Lower Lake Road in the stockyards section of the city. Paralleling two railroad lines, Interstate 229 (I-229) and the nearby Missouri River, Route 759 eventually weaves through more dense parts of the city, intersecting with U.S. Route 36 (US 36) before merging northbound into I-229 and US 59.

== Route description ==
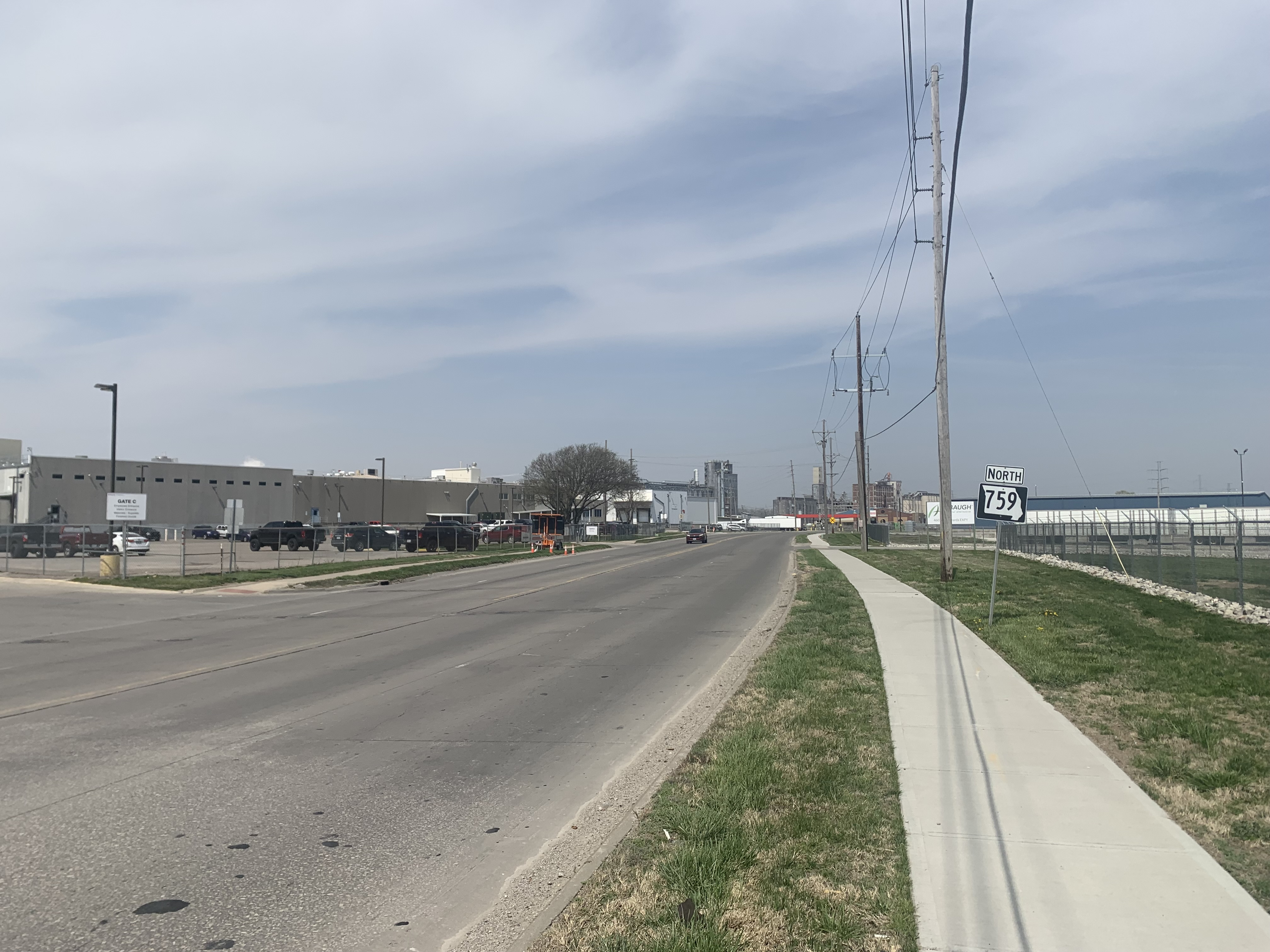
Southern Terminus of Route 759 in St. Joseph

Route 759 begins at an intersection with Southwest Lower Lake Road and Packers Avenue in the stockyards section of St. Joseph. The route heads to the northeast as a divided arterial boulevard known as the Stockyards Expressway, paralleling two large rail yards through a large industrial portion of the city. After the intersection with West Florence Road, Route 759 changes monikers from Stockyards Expressway to South Second Street. At that point, the route makes a gradual bend to the north along with the nearby Missouri River, becoming Stockyards Expressway once again as it parallels I-229 and US 59. The route then enters an interchange with US 36, which crosses the Missouri River nearby. After the interchange, Route 759 becomes a highway ramp and merges into I-229 northbound and its parent US 59. The designation of Route 759 terminates at the merge near downtown Saint Joseph.

== Junction list ==
The entire route is in St. Joseph, Buchanan County.

mi	km	Destinations	Notes
0.000	0.000	Southwest Lower Lake Road	Southern terminus; right-of-way continues southward as Packers Avenue.
1.802	2.900	US 36	Interchange
2.126	3.421	I-229 / US 59	Northern terminus; I-229/US 59 exit 5
1.000 mi = 1.609 km; 1.000 km = 0.621 mi
