= Jordan Branch (Saint Johns Creek tributary) =

Stream in the US state of Missouri

Jordan Branch (also called Jordan Creek) is a stream in Franklin County in the U.S. state of Missouri. It is a tributary of Saint Johns Creek.

The stream headwaters arise at 38°24′46″N 91°08′07″W and it flows north-northeast passing under US Route 50 approximately six miles west of Union. It continues to the north-northeast for approximately two miles to its confluence with Saint Johns Creek at 38°27′58″N 91°06′55″W.

Jordan Branch most likely takes its name from the Jordan River, in West Asia.

== See also ==
- List of rivers of Missouri
