= Anita B. Gorman =

American advocate

- Born: November 17, 1930 (95 years old)

Anita B. Gorman is a conservation advocate from Missouri. She is the first woman who was appointed to the Kansas City Board of Parks and Recreation Commissioners.

== Life ==
Gorman was born in Palmyra, Missouri. The family moved to Kansas City in 1943. Her father worked as a mechanic for TWA. She earned an undergraduate degree in economics from William Jewell College and a graduate degree in economics from Boston University. She married Gerald Gorman in 1954 and had two daughters.

== Philanthropy and Conservation ==
In 1979, Gorman was the first woman appointed to Kansas City's Board of Parks and Recreation Commissioners. She served as president of the Board from 1986 to 1991.

She is a lifetime member of the Board of Directors for the Starlight Theatre (Kansas City, Missouri). She raised millions of dollars for the Theatre, and in 2007 the Theatre created the Anita B. Gorman Court of Honor.

Gorman helped found the Missouri Conservation Heritage Foundation, a nonprofit 501(c)(3) organization that raises funds for conservation projects in Missouri. The Anita B. Gorman Conservation Discovery Center, an educational complex and office for the Missouri Department of Conservation located in Kansas City's Kauffman Legacy Park, is named for her.
