= Amazonia, Missouri =

City in Andrew County, Missouri, United States

- City
- Amazonia
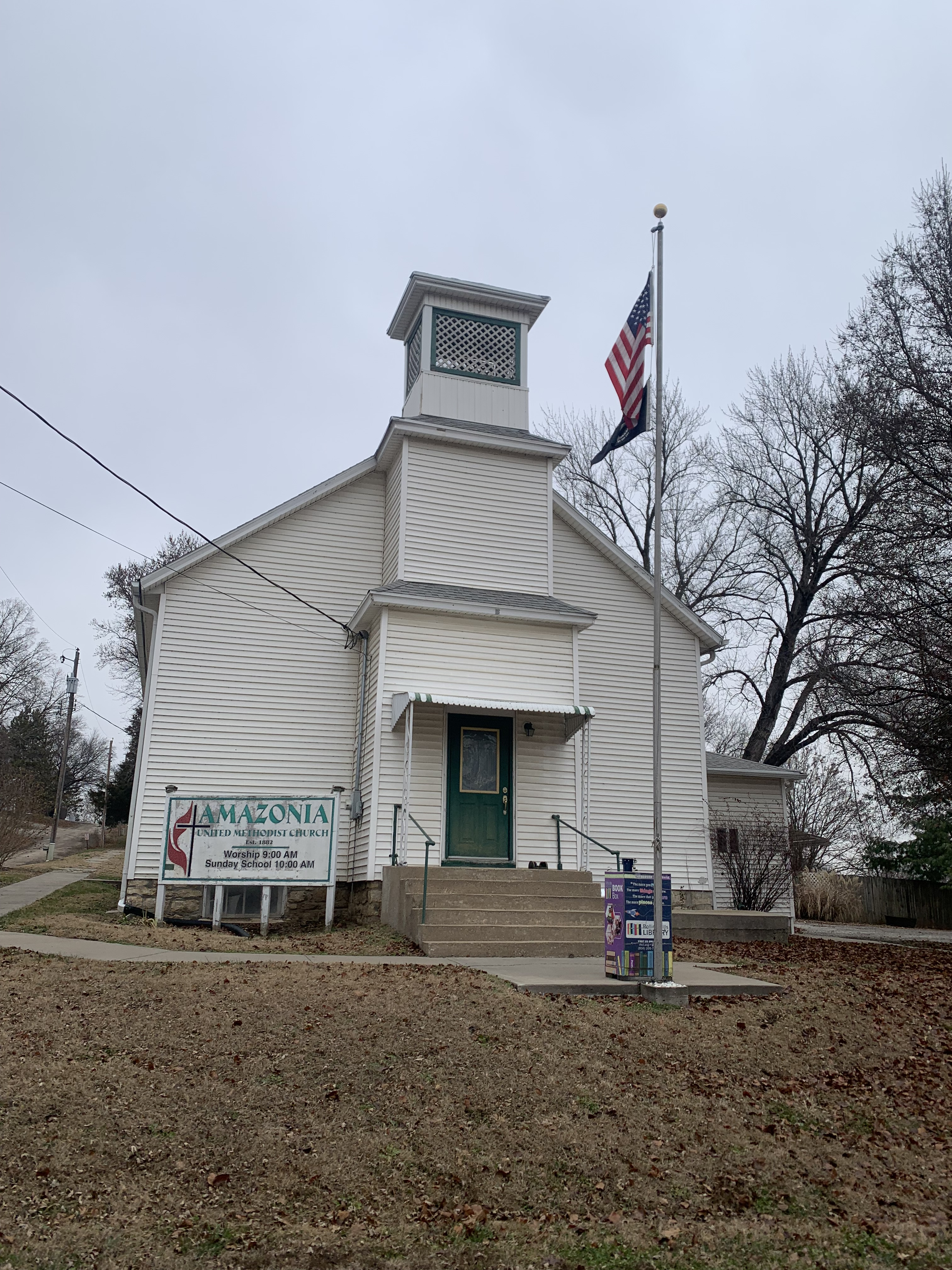
- Amazonia United Methodist Church, December 2025

- Location of Amazonia, Missouri
- Coordinates: 39°53′20″N 94°53′34″W
- Country: United States
- State: Missouri
- County: Andrew
- Township: Lincoln
- Established: 1857

Area
  - Total: 0.37 sq mi (0.95 km^{2})
  - Land: 0.37 sq mi (0.95 km^{2})
  - Water: 0 sq mi (0.00 km^{2})
- Elevation: 863 ft (263 m)

Population (2020)
  - Total: 238
  - Density: 647.1/sq mi (249.83/km^{2})
- Time zone: UTC-6 (Central (CST))
  - Summer (DST): UTC-5 (CDT)
- ZIP code: 64421
- Area code: 816
- FIPS code: 29-01018
- GNIS feature ID: 2397954
- Website: cityofamazoniamo.com

Amazonia is a city in Lincoln Township, Andrew County, Missouri, United States. The population was 238 at the 2020 census. It is part of the St. Joseph, MO–KS Metropolitan Statistical Area.

== History ==
Amazonia was laid out in 1857. A post office called Amazonia has been in operation since 1859. The origin of the name Amazonia is obscure.

== Geography ==
According to the United States Census Bureau, the village has a total area of 0.37 square miles (0.96 km^{2}), all land.

== Demographics ==
Historical population
Census	Pop.	Note	%±
1880	262		—
1890	282		7.6%
1900	407		44.3%
1910	456		12.0%
1920	367		−19.5%
1930	359		−2.2%
1940	321		−10.6%
1950	308		−4.0%
1960	326		5.8%
1970	326		0.0%
1980	314		−3.7%
1990	257		−18.2%
2000	277		7.8%
2010	312		12.6%
2020	238		−23.7%
U.S. Decennial Census

=== 2010 census ===
As of the census of 2010, there were 312 people, 118 households, and 83 families residing in the village. The population density was 843.2 inhabitants per square mile (325.6/km^{2}). There were 136 housing units at an average density of 367.6 per square mile (141.9/km^{2}). The racial makeup of the village was 97.4% White, 0.3% African American, 1.0% Native American, 0.6% from other races, and 0.6% from two or more races. Hispanic or Latino of any race were 1.0% of the population.

There were 118 households, of which 33.9% had children under the age of 18 living with them, 54.2% were married couples living together, 9.3% had a female householder with no husband present, 6.8% had a male householder with no wife present, and 29.7% were non-families. 22.9% of all households were made up of individuals, and 11% had someone living alone who was 65 years of age or older. The average household size was 2.64 and the average family size was 3.06.

The median age in the village was 39.7 years. 25.6% of residents were under the age of 18; 7.4% were between the ages of 18 and 24; 24.7% were from 25 to 44; 29.7% were from 45 to 64; and 12.5% were 65 years of age or older. The gender makeup of the village was 51.0% male and 49.0% female.

=== 2000 census ===
As of the census of 2000, there were 277 people, 106 households, and 83 families residing in the village. The population density was 785.1 inhabitants per square mile (303.1/km^{2}). There were 114 housing units at an average density of 323.1 per square mile (124.7/km^{2}). The racial makeup of the village was 99.28% White, 0.36% African American, and 0.36% from two or more races.

There were 106 households, out of which 34.9% had children under the age of 18 living with them, 63.2% were married couples living together, 11.3% had a female householder with no husband present, and 20.8% were non-families. 19.8% of all households were made up of individuals, and 7.5% had someone living alone who was 65 years of age or older. The average household size was 2.61 and the average family size was 2.96.

In the village, the population was spread out, with 25.6% under the age of 18, 9.0% from 18 to 24, 30.7% from 25 to 44, 23.1% from 45 to 64, and 11.6% who were 65 years of age or older. The median age was 35 years. For every 100 females, there were 100.7 males. For every 100 females age 18 and over, there were 102.0 males.

The median income for a household in the village was $36,250, and the median income for a family was $42,813. Males had a median income of $29,167 versus $14,444 for females. The per capita income for the village was $17,609. About 9.4% of families and 12.0% of the population were below the poverty line, including 16.2% of those under the age of eighteen and 23.8% of those 65 or over.

== Education ==
It is in the Savannah R-III School District.

== See also ==
- List of cities in Missouri
