= Fair Township, Platte County, Missouri =

Township in Platte County, Missouri, U.S.

Fair Township
- Township
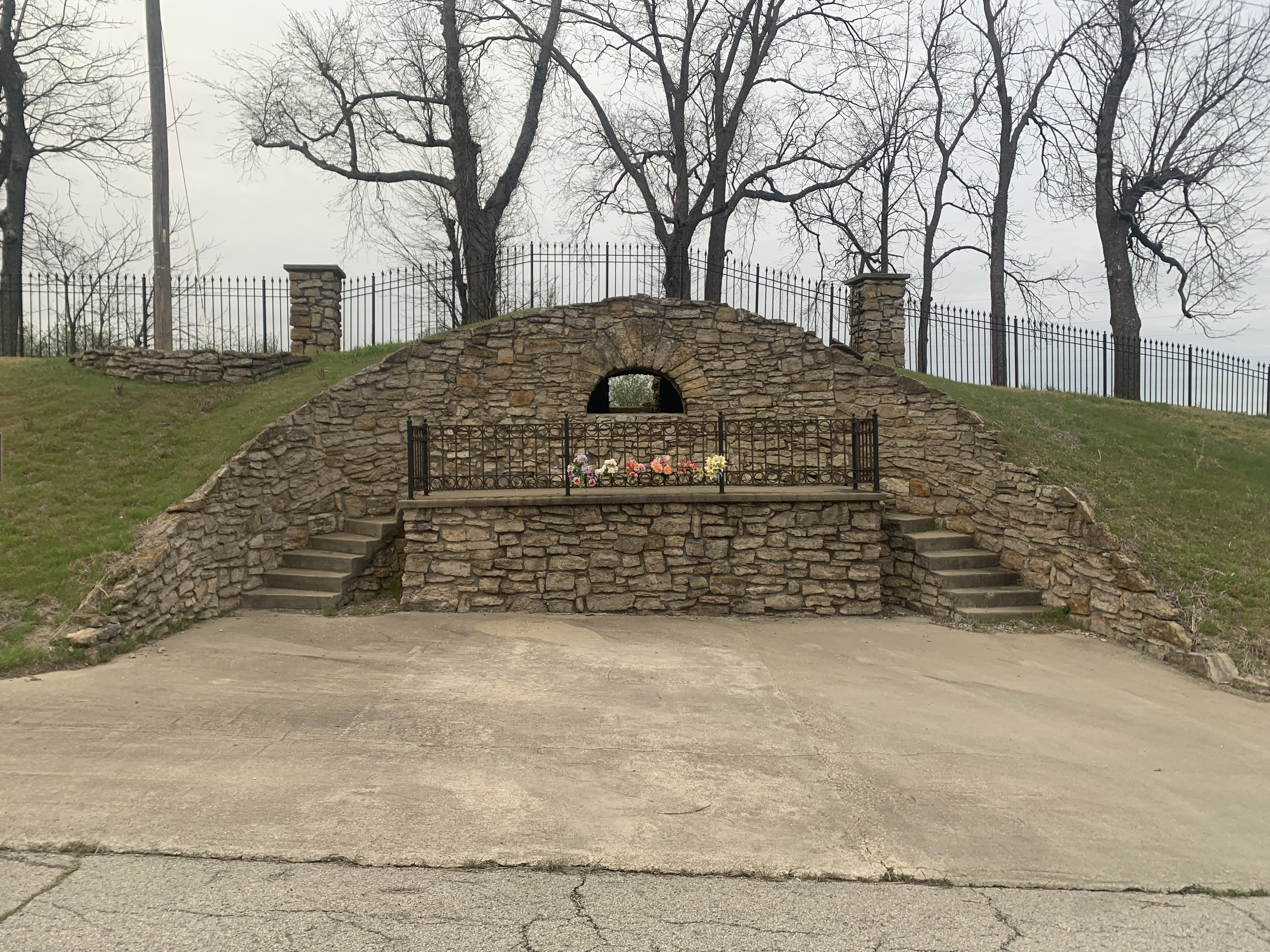
- Site of Halfway house and stone basement at West Platte, Missouri

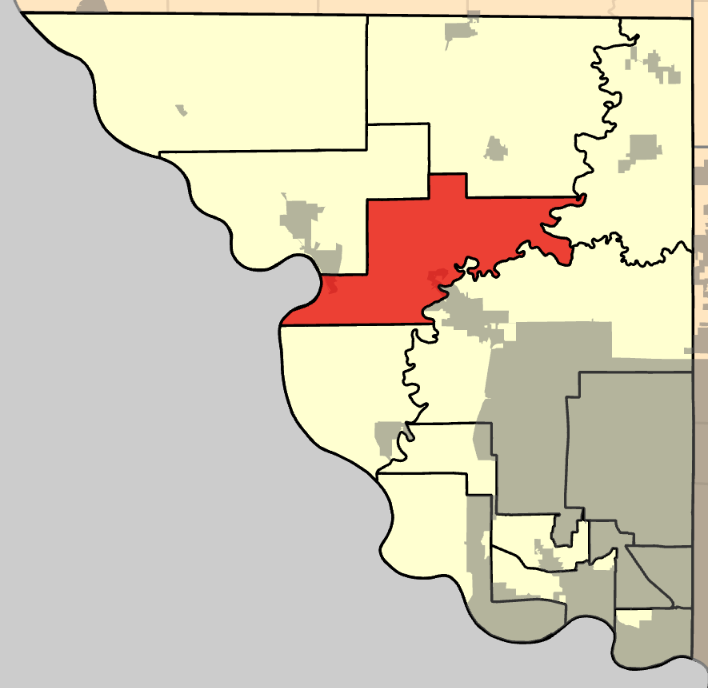
- Coordinates: 39°23′37″N 94°48′21″W
- Country: United States
- State: Missouri
- County: Platte

Area
  - Total: 33.6 sq mi (87 km^{2})
  - Land: 33.19 sq mi (86.0 km^{2})
  - Water: 0.41 sq mi (1.1 km^{2}) 1.22%
- Elevation: 873 ft (266 m)

Population (2020)
  - Total: 1,089
  - Density: 32.8/sq mi (12.7/km^{2})
- FIPS code: 29-16523230
- GNIS feature ID: 767197

Fair Township is a township in Platte County, Missouri, United States. At the 2020 census, its population was 1,089.

Fair Township was erected in 1876 when it was split from Lee Township, and named for the fact that the county fair once was held within its borders. a small portion of Weston Bend State Park is located within this township, with most of it in neighboring Weston Township.
