= Missouri Route 9 =

State highway in Missouri, U.S.

Route 9

Route information
- Maintained by MoDOT
- Length: 14.275 mi (22.973 km)

Major junctions
- South end: I-35 / I-70 / US 24 / US 40 in Kansas City
- US 169 in Kansas City; I-635 / US 69 in Riverside
- North end: I-29 / US 71 in Kansas City

Location
- Country: United States
- State: Missouri

Highway system
- Missouri State Highway System; Interstate; US; State; Supplemental
← Route 8	→ Route 10

Route 9 is a highway in the Kansas City, Missouri area. Its northern terminus is at Interstate 29/U.S. Route 71 in Kansas City North; its southern terminus is at Interstate 35/Interstate 70/U.S. Route 24/U.S. Route 40 in downtown Kansas City. Though both termini are in Kansas City, it passes through other towns and cities. It is carried across the Missouri River by the Heart of America Bridge between downtown Kansas City, Missouri and North Kansas City, Missouri. In North Kansas City, the highway serves as a main thoroughfare, Burlington Street.

== Route Description ==
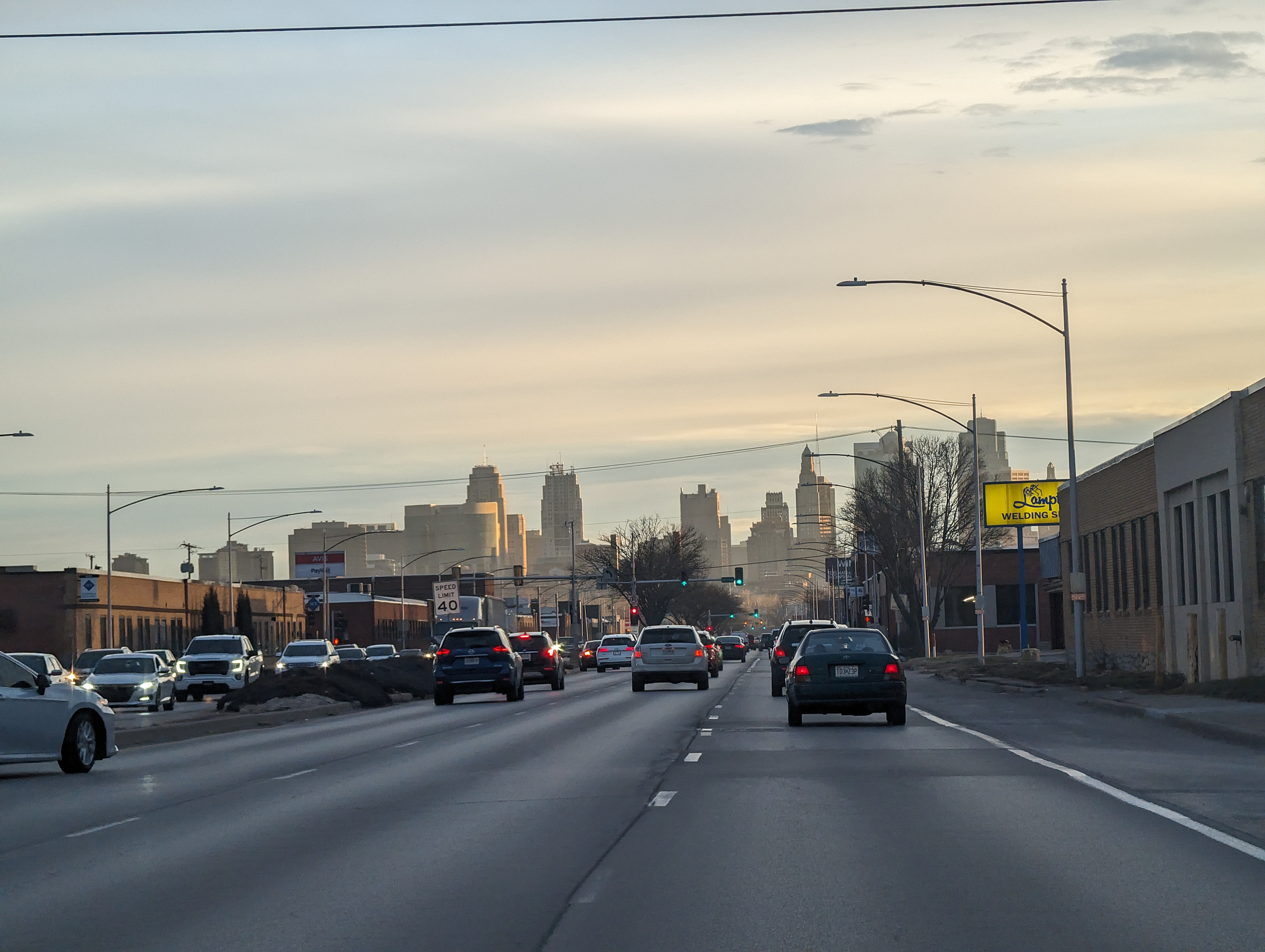
Route 9 Approaching downtown KCMO

Beginning at the Missouri River, Route 9 travels north through the west side of North Kansas City as a six-lane surface street. As it enters Kansas City, it splits off Route 283, which continues northward, while Route 9 traverses northwesterly. It then intersects US-169 and immediately after entering Riverside, it junctions with I-635 and US-69 and then continues west-northwest. It then enters Parkville and turns northward as it travels through downtown and past the Riss Lake neighborhood to Route 45. From Route 45, it exits Parkville and reenters Kansas City traveling northeast past the Royal Oaks North neighborhood. Then it turns north, passing on the west side of Platte Woods and the east side of Park Forest and Platte Ridge and then arrives at its northern terminus where it junctions with Northwest Barry Road and I-29.

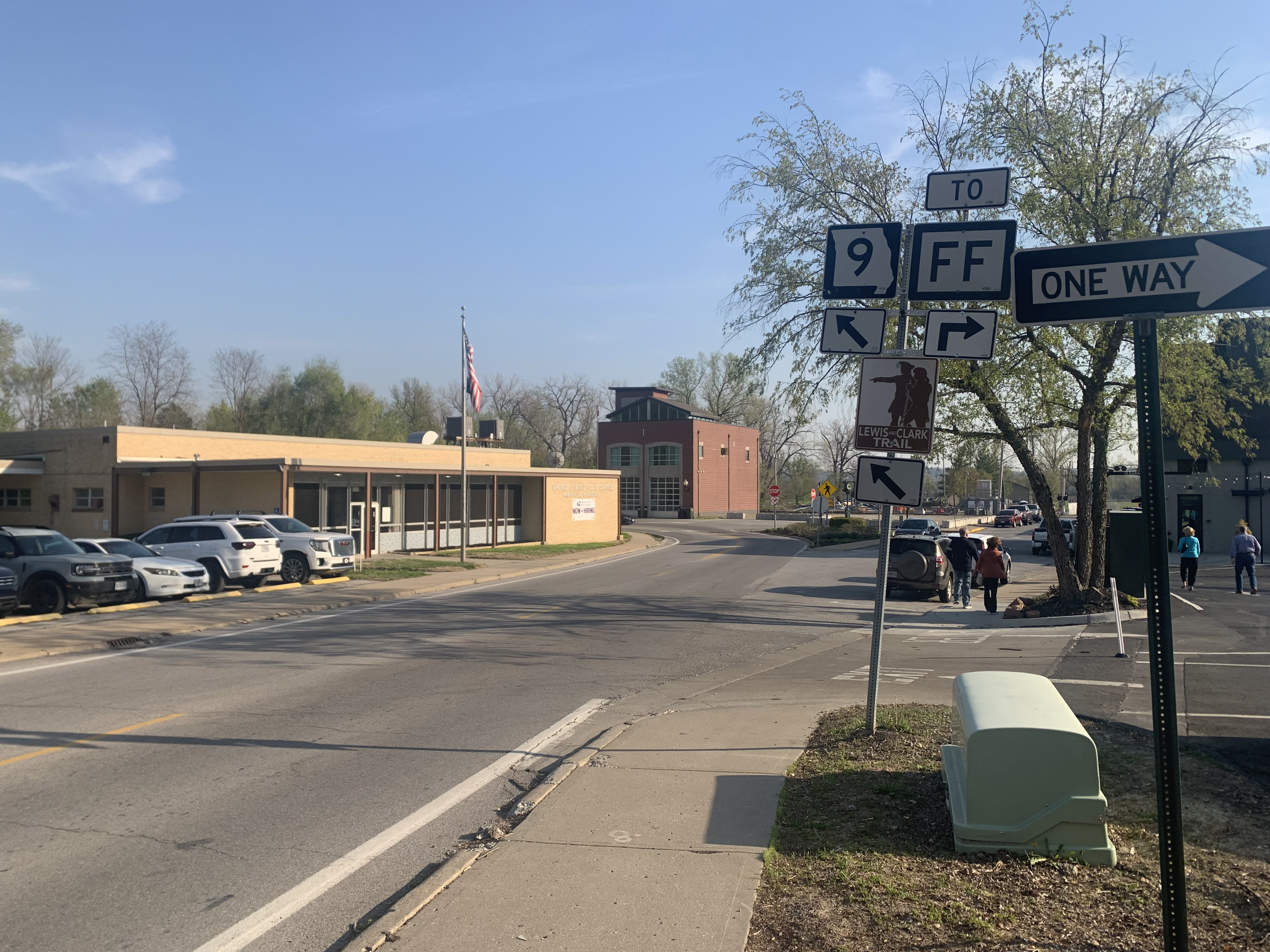
Junction of Route 9 and Route FF in Parkville

== History ==
Route 9 was created in 1922 as Route 59 and was renumbered in the early 1930s when US 59 entered Missouri.

== Junction list ==
County	Location	mi	km	Destinations	Notes
Jackson	Kansas City	0.000	0.000	Heart of America Bridge continues beyond southern terminus	
Jackson	Kansas City	0.094	0.151	I-35 / I-70 / US 24 / US 40	Southern terminus; I-35/I-70 exit 2E; US-40 is unsigned
Jackson	Kansas City	0.406	0.653	3rd Street	Interchange; southbound exit and northbound entrance
Missouri River		1.258	2.025	North end of Heart of America Bridge	
Clay	North Kansas City	3.160– 3.282	5.086– 5.282	Oak Trafficway	Formerly Route 283
Clay	Kansas City	4.069	6.548	US 169 (Arrowhead Trafficway) – Charles B. Wheeler Downtown Airport, Smithville	South end of freeway; northbound exit and southbound entrance; SB access to US 169 north via U-turn
Clay	Kansas City	4.646	7.477	Briarcliff Parkway	
Platte	Riverside	5.425	8.731	US 69 north (Riverway Parkway)	Southbound exit and northbound entrance; south end of US 69 overlap
Platte	Riverside	6.135	9.873	US 69 south / I-635 – Kansas	I-635 exit 11; north end of freeway; north end of US 69 overlap
Platte	Parkville	11.100	17.864	Route 45 (Tom Watson Parkway)	
Platte	Kansas City	14.275	22.973	NW Barry Road	
1.000 mi = 1.609 km; 1.000 km = 0.621 mi: Concurrency terminus; Incomplete access
