= Faucett, Missouri =

Census-designated place in Buchanan County, Missouri, United States

- Census-Designated Place
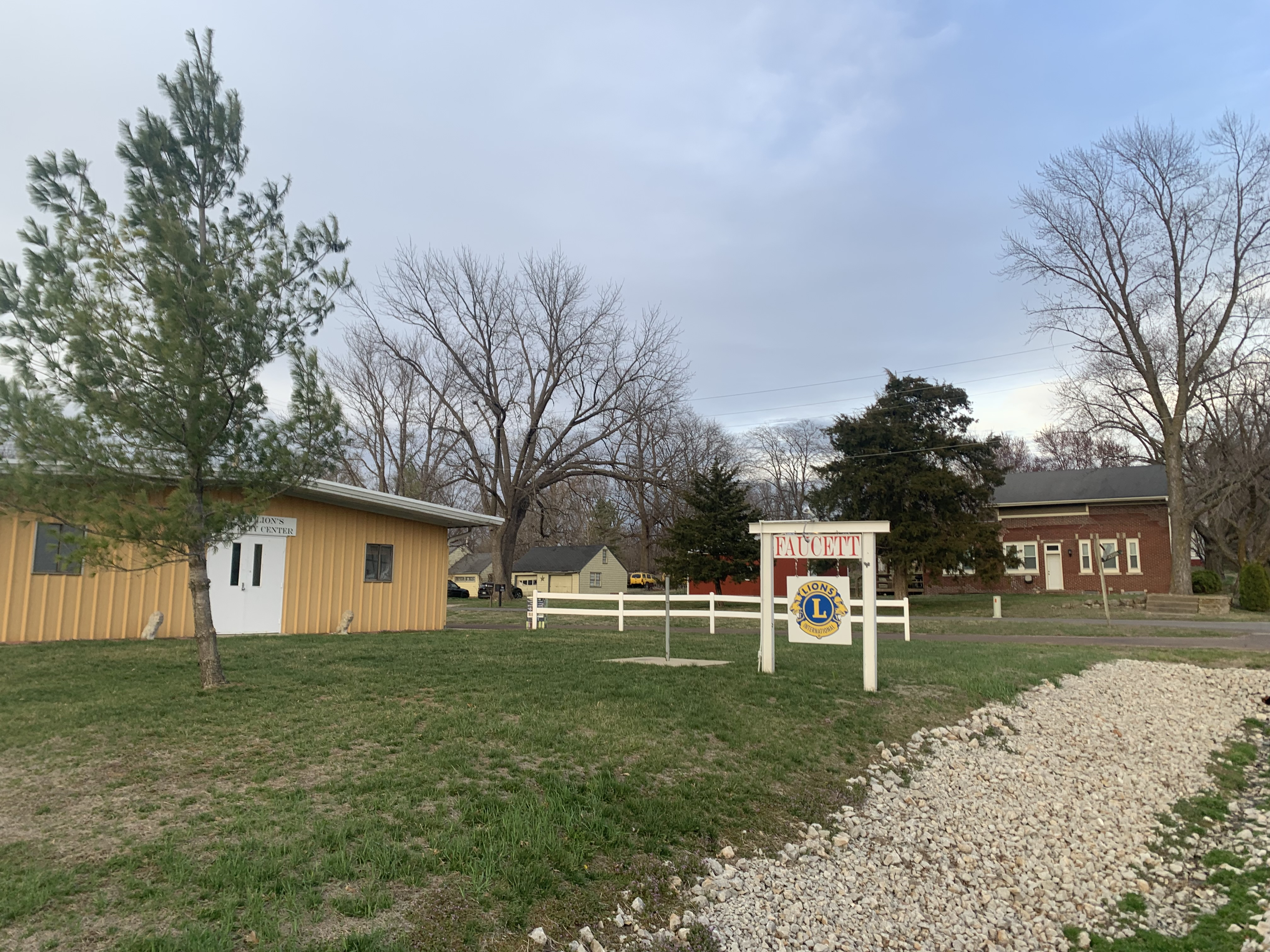
- Lion's Club in Faucett, March 2025
- Interactive map of Faucett, Missouri
- Coordinates: 39°36′01″N 94°47′51″W
- Country: United States
- State: Missouri
- County: Buchanan
- Township: Crawford

Area
  - Total: 0.99 sq mi (2.56 km^{2})
  - Land: 0.99 sq mi (2.56 km^{2})
  - Water: 0 sq mi (0.00 km^{2})
- Elevation: 981 ft (299 m)

Population (2020)
  - Total: 248
  - Density: 251.3/sq mi (97.02/km^{2})
- ZIP code: 64448
- Area codes: 816 and 975
- FIPS code: 29-23824
- GNIS feature ID: 2804680

Faucett is a census-designated place (CDP) in southern Buchanan County, Missouri, United States. It is located 16 miles (26 km) north of Platte City on Interstate 49 / U.S. Route 71. The community is part of the St. Joseph, MO–KS Metropolitan Statistical Area. The population was 248 at the 2020 census.

== Description ==
Faucett derives its name from Robert Faucett, who was a local miller when the Chicago Great Western Railroad established the community in 1890. A post office called Faucett has been in operation since 1891.

The community's most notable landmark is the Farris Truck Stop on Interstate 29, which has a 1974 Peterbilt truck, with a 1965 Fruehauf trailer standing 50 feet high to advertise the truck stop. The truck stop closed in 2021, however, the sign still remains as a landmark.

The township has a private airport, "Farris Strip", that was built by the late Edwin "Dump" Farris. The airport was built in the 1950s and originally had a runway length of 1800'. The runway was later expanded to the current length of 2100'. During the airport's peak success, several businesses were located on the field. These included flight instruction, aircraft rental/sales, and aerial applicators ("crop dusters"). At one time the airport had 99 students actively learning to fly.

The second highest (behind Ste. Genevieve) number of meteorites in the state of Missouri have been found around the community (100 kg.), with most believed to have fallen in summer 1907.

== Demographics ==
Historical population
| Census | Pop. | Note | %± |
|---|---|---|---|
| 2020 | 248 | | — |
U.S. Decennial Census

Faucett first appeared as a census designated place in the 2020 U.S. census.

== Education ==
The school district is Mid-Buchanan County R-V School District.

== Notable person ==
- Esther George, president of the Federal Reserve Bank of Kansas City
