= New Market, Missouri =

Census-designated place in Platte County, Missouri, United States

- Census-Designated Place
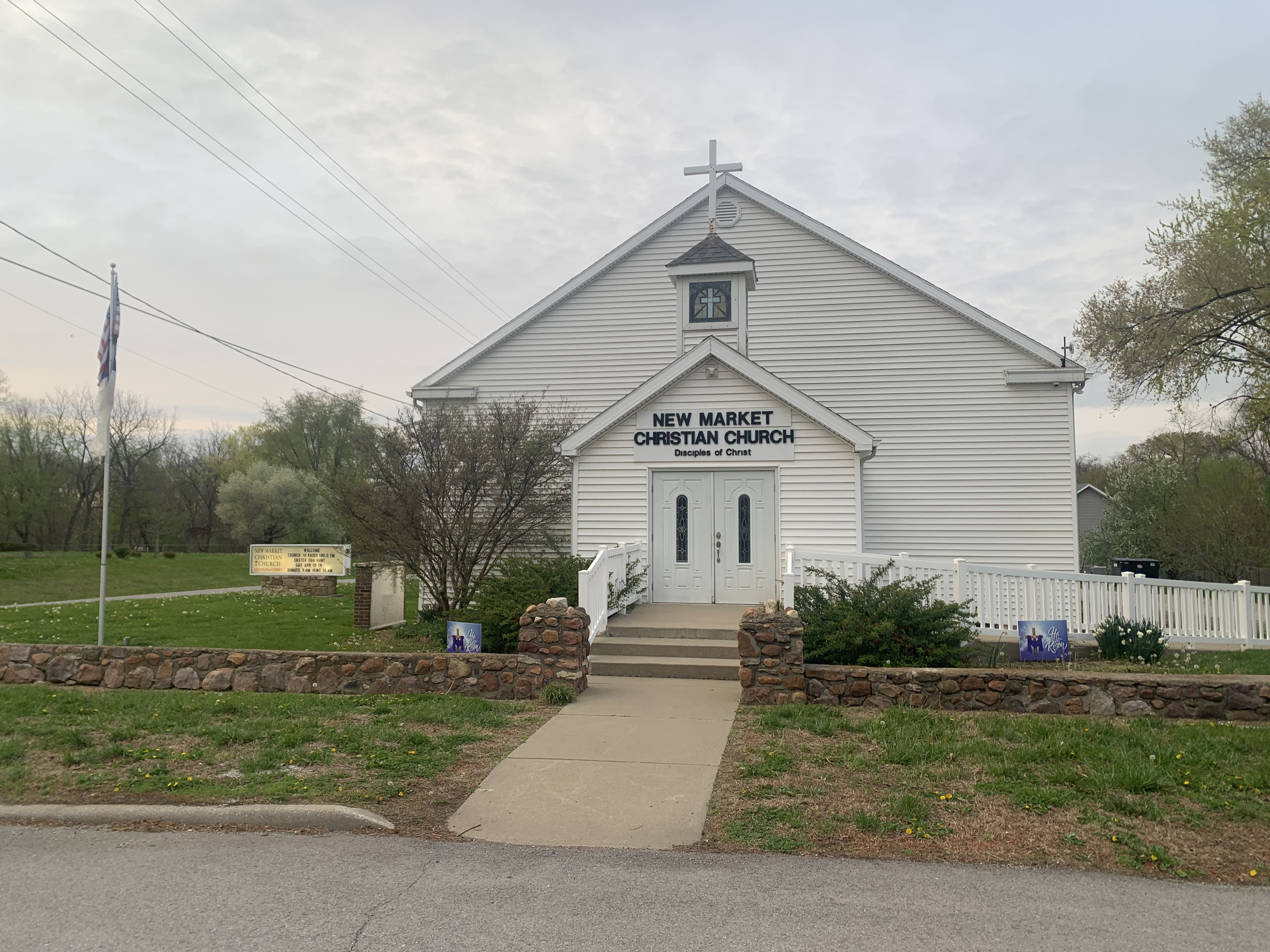
- New Market Christian Church in New Market, Missouri
- Interactive map of New Market, Missouri
- Coordinates: 39°30′07″N 94°47′58″W
- Country: United States
- State: Missouri
- County: Platte
- Township: Green

Area
  - Total: 0.19 sq mi (0.50 km^{2})
  - Land: 0.19 sq mi (0.50 km^{2})
  - Water: 0 sq mi (0.00 km^{2})
- Elevation: 876 ft (267 m)

Population (2020)
  - Total: 88
  - Density: 460.0/sq mi (177.61/km^{2})
- FIPS code: 29-52130
- GNIS feature ID: 2806420

New Market is a census designated place (CDP) in northern Platte County, Missouri, United States. It lies within the Kansas City metropolitan area. The population was 88 at the 2020 census.

The community is located on Missouri Route 371 about 1.5 miles south of the Platte–Buchanan county line. Dearborn is two miles to the northeast across U.S. Route 71 and Bee Creek flows past the west side of the community.

== History ==
New Market was originally named Jacksonville, named by Jacob Adamson, a Tennesseean and admirer of Andrew Jackson. A post office called New Market was established in 1839 after Adamson learned that Jacksonville was taken, and it remained in operation until 1959.

== Demographics ==
Historical population
Census	Pop.	Note	%±
1900	182		—
1910	120		−34.1%
1920	91		−24.2%
1930	107		17.6%
1940	75		−29.9%
2020	88		—
Missouri Census Data Center

New Market was incorporated until the 1940s. It did not appear thereafter until it was listed as a census designated place in the 2020 U.S. census. A population estimate from the 1870s is about 200.

New Market, Missouri – Racial and ethnic composition Note: the US Census treats Hispanic/Latino as an ethnic category. This table excludes Latinos from the racial categories and assigns them to a separate category. Hispanics/Latinos may be of any race.
Race / Ethnicity (NH = Non-Hispanic)	Pop 2020	2020
White alone (NH)	85	96.59%
Black or African American alone (NH)	0	0.00%
Native American or Alaska Native alone (NH)	0	0.00%
Asian alone (NH)	0	0.00%
Native Hawaiian or Pacific Islander alone (NH)	0	0.00%
Other race alone (NH)	0	0.00%
Mixed race or Multiracial (NH)	3	3.41%
Hispanic or Latino (any race)	0	0.00%
Total	88	100.00%

== Education ==
It is in the North Platte County R-I School District.

== See also ==
- List of census-designated places in Missouri
