= Wallace, Missouri =

Unincorporated community in Missouri, U.S.

Coordinates: 39°33′19″N 94°50′49″W

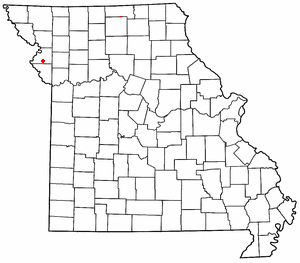

Wallace is an unincorporated community in southern Buchanan County, Missouri, United States. Wallace is located approximately twelve miles northwest of Platte City. Its post office has closed and mail now comes from nearby Dearborn.

The community is part of the St. Joseph, MO–KS Metropolitan Statistical Area.

== History ==
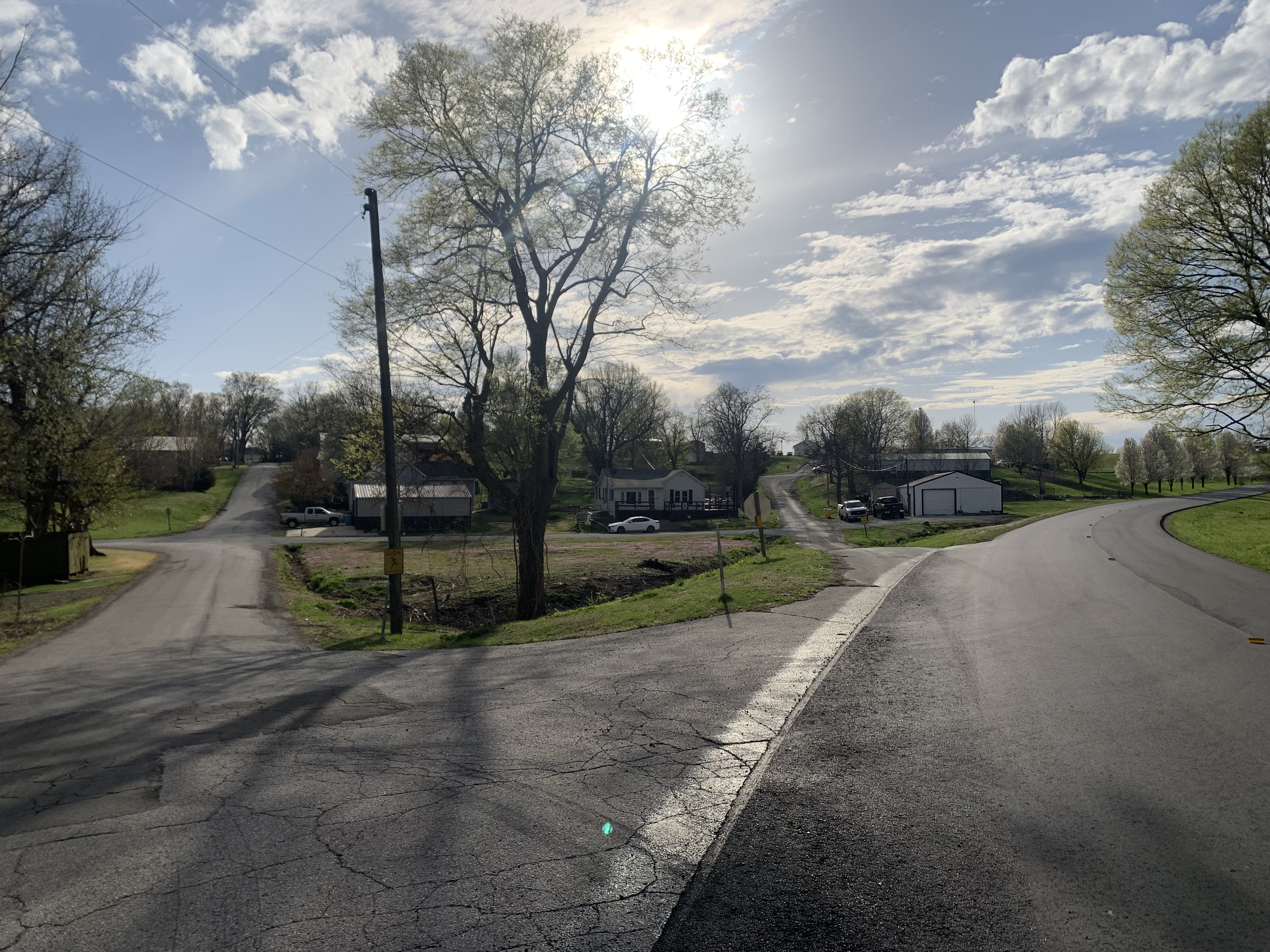
Wallace, Missouri from Missouri Route 116

Wallace was platted in 1872. The community has the name of a railroad official. A post office called Wallace was established in 1877, and remained in operation until 1966. On April 10, 1965, an F3 tornado struck Wallace, causing no fatalities, but 11 people were injured, and damage was estimated between 50,000 and 500,000 dollars
