= Waldron Township, Platte County, Missouri =

Township in Platte County, Missouri, U.S.

Waldron Township
- Township
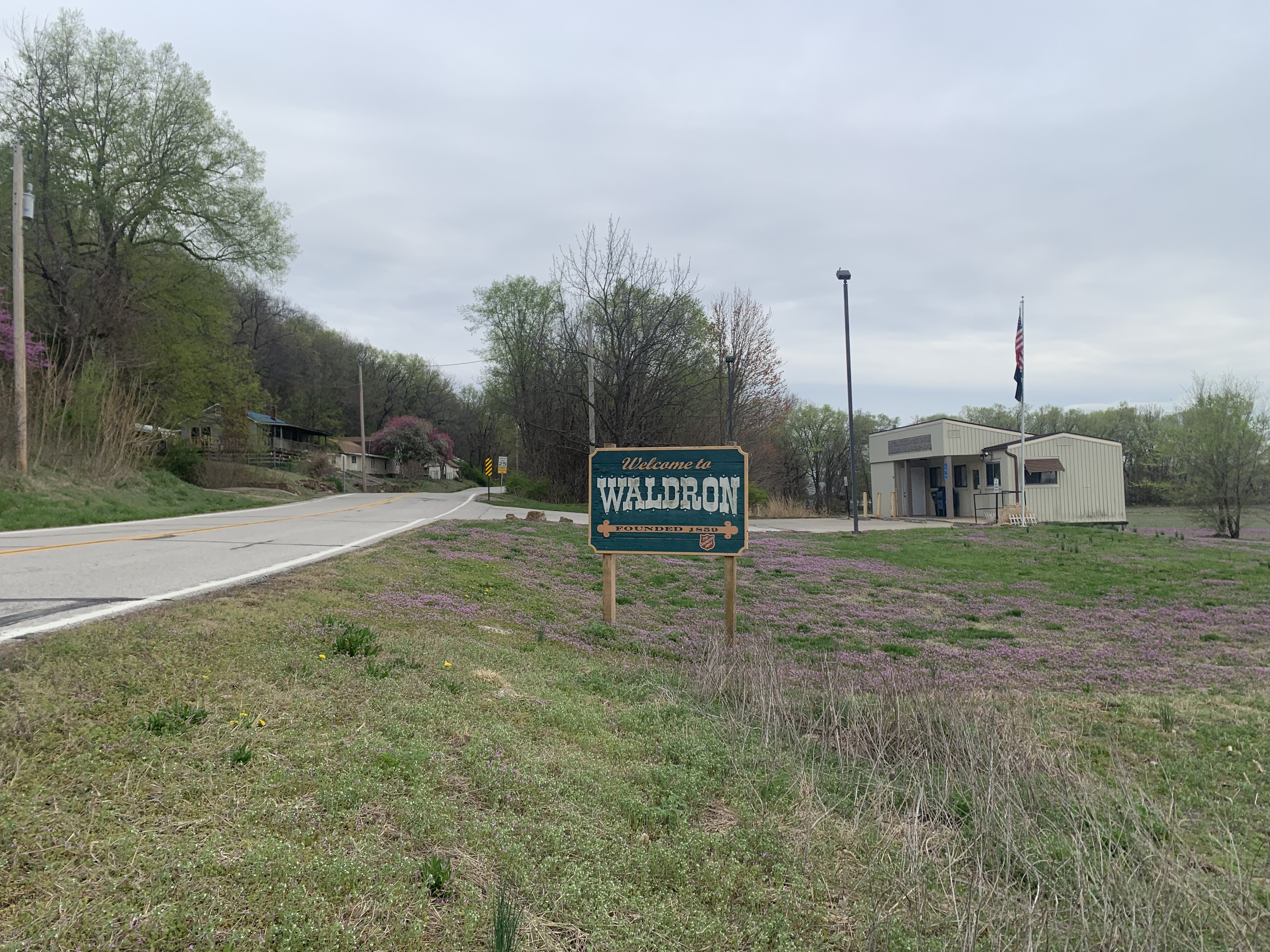
- Waldron, Missouri from NW River Rd

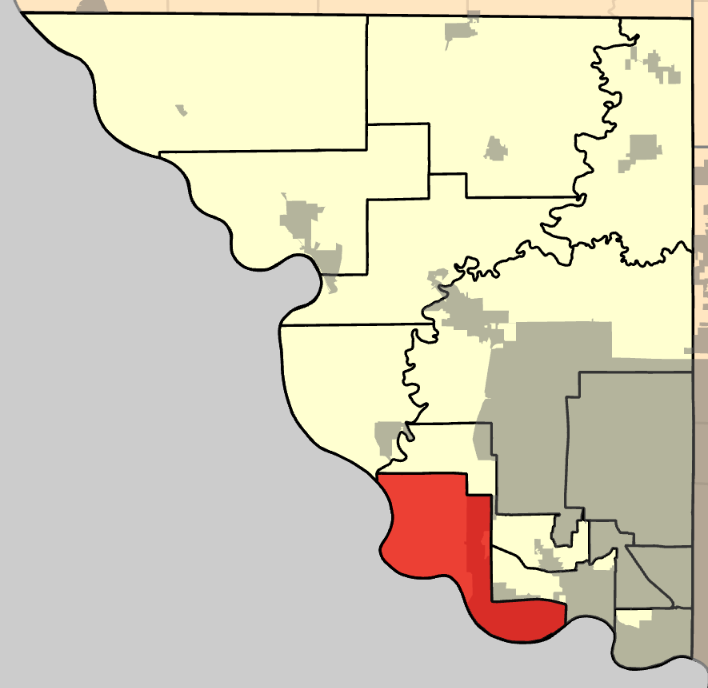
- Coordinates: 39°13′25″N 94°46′43″W
- Country: United States
- State: Missouri
- County: Platte

Area
  - Total: 23.09 sq mi (59.8 km^{2})
  - Land: 22.14 sq mi (57.3 km^{2})
  - Water: 0.95 sq mi (2.5 km^{2}) 4.11%
- Elevation: 978 ft (298 m)

Population (2020)
  - Total: 1,261
  - Density: 56.9/sq mi (22.0/km^{2})
- FIPS code: 29-16576606
- GNIS feature ID: 767208

Waldron Township is a township in Platte County, Missouri, United States. At the 2020 census, its population was 1,261.

Waldron Township has the name of the local Waldron family.

== See also ==
- Waldron, Missouri
