= Farley, Missouri =

Village in Platte County, Missouri, United States

- Village
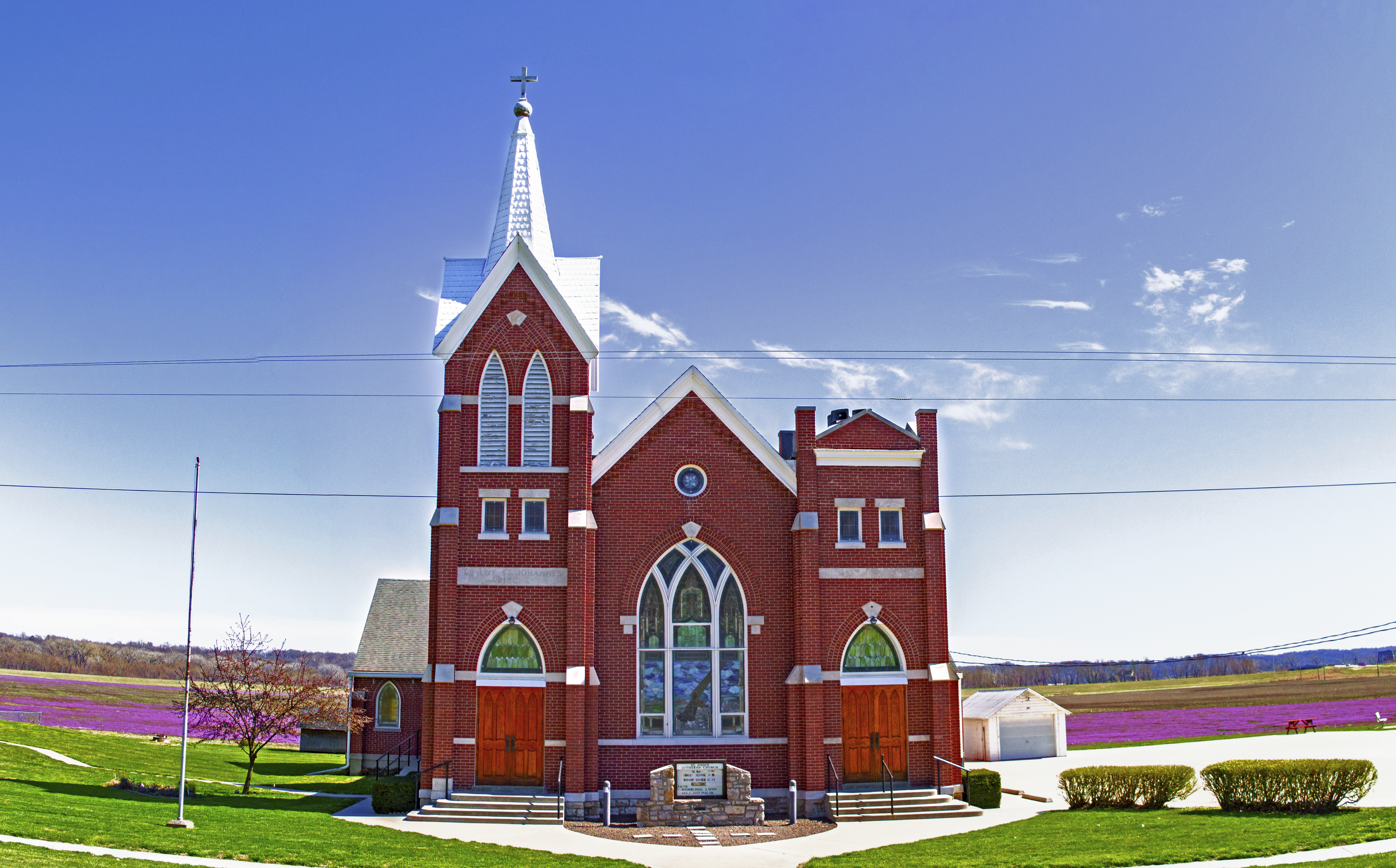
- St. John's Lutheran Church in Farley

- Location of Farley, Missouri
- Coordinates: 39°17′18″N 94°49′43″W
- Country: United States
- State: Missouri
- County: Platte
- Township: Lee
- Incorporated: 1850

Area
  - Total: 1.15 sq mi (2.99 km^{2})
  - Land: 1.15 sq mi (2.99 km^{2})
  - Water: 0 sq mi (0.00 km^{2})
- Elevation: 804 ft (245 m)

Population (2020)
  - Total: 265
  - Density: 229.3/sq mi (88.52/km^{2})
- Time zone: UTC-6 (Central (CST))
  - Summer (DST): UTC-5 (CDT)
- ZIP code: 64028
- Area code: 816
- FIPS code: 29-23698
- GNIS feature ID: 2398861

Farley is a village along the Platte River in Platte County, Missouri, United States. The population was 265 at the 2020 census. It lies within the Kansas City metropolitan area.

== History ==
A post office called Farley has been in operation since 1852. The community has the name of Joseph Farley, the original owner of the land where the village now is located.

In Farley on August 20, 1900, Sheriff John H. Dillingham responded to a double homicide with two deputies. On Main Street, Sheriff John Dillingham encountered the murderer, Dr. Sterling Price Harrington who was the town's doctor. Dr. Harrington and Sheriff Dillingham were friends and related by marriage. Dr. Harrington, who had murdered his mother-in-law and uncle-in-law the day before, was at Farley General store attempting to purchase more ammunition. He did not have enough money and attempted a robbery of the store. The general store owner pulled out a pistol and shots were exchanged between them. The clerk ran out of bullets and dropped his weapon saying he was shot. Dr. Harrington then left the store through the front door. There he encountered Sheriff Dillingham. Gunshots were exchanged and Dr. Harrington shot the Sheriff in the head, killing him instantly. The doctor then stepped over the sheriff's lifeless body. The sheriff’s twenty-three-year-old son Henry, a deputy, returned fire fatally wounding Dr. Harrington.

This incident and the murders of Dr. Harrington's in-laws were witnessed by Dr. Harrington's 10-year-old daughter Maude, as the doctor had his daughter with him during his murderous rampage. The doctor was believed to be intoxicated and on drugs during the crime spree. The doctor was looking for his wife who had sought safety in Platte City, Mo. Deputy Sheriff Henry Dillingham was appointed as Sheriff to fill his father’s unexpired term. Henry Dillingham 30 years later became a U.S. Marshall. Sheriff John Dillingham was the first and the only Platte County Sheriffs Office law enforcement officer to be killed in the line-of-duty as of January 26, 2021.

The General Store where this incident took place was razed many years ago but there is a plaque erected marking this incident at the old store's location on Main Street near the current post office. The plaque was erected by the Platte County Historical Society.

== Geography ==
Farley is located on Missouri Route 45 approximately one mile north of the confluence of the Platte River with the Missouri River.

According to the United States Census Bureau, the village has a total area of 1.23 square miles (3.19 km^{2}), all land.

== Demographics ==
Historical population
Census	Pop.	Note	%±
1880	120		—
1910	96		—
1920	98		2.1%
1930	111		13.3%
1940	111		0.0%
1950	98		−11.7%
1960	120		22.4%
1970	174		45.0%
1980	184		5.7%
1990	217		17.9%
2000	226		4.1%
2010	269		19.0%
2020	265		−1.5%
U.S. Decennial Census

=== 2010 census ===
As of the census of 2010, there were 269 people, 107 households, and 76 families living in the village. The population density was 218.7 inhabitants per square mile (84.4/km^{2}). There were 111 housing units at an average density of 90.2 per square mile (34.8/km^{2}). The racial makeup of the village was 97.0% White, 1.9% Asian, and 1.1% from two or more races. Hispanic or Latino of any race were 1.9% of the population.

There were 107 households, of which 30.8% had children under the age of 18 living with them, 61.7% were married couples living together, 3.7% had a female householder with no husband present, 5.6% had a male householder with no wife present, and 29.0% were non-families. 27.1% of all households were made up of individuals, and 12.1% had someone living alone who was 65 years of age or older. The average household size was 2.51 and the average family size was 3.05.

The median age in the village was 45.4 years. 26% of residents were under the age of 18; 6.3% were between the ages of 18 and 24; 16.4% were from 25 to 44; 37.5% were from 45 to 64; and 13.8% were 65 years of age or older. The gender makeup of the village was 53.9% male and 46.1% female.

=== 2000 census ===
As of the census of 2000, there were 226 people, 89 households, and 66 families living in the village. The population density was 301.3 inhabitants per square mile (116.3/km^{2}). There were 90 housing units at an average density of 120.0 per square mile (46.3/km^{2}). The racial makeup of the village was 98.23% White and 1.77% Asian.

There were 89 households, out of which 31.5% had children under the age of 18 living with them, 67.4% were married couples living together, 2.2% had a female householder with no husband present, and 25.8% were non-families. 23.6% of all households were made up of individuals, and 5.6% had someone living alone who was 65 years of age or older. The average household size was 2.54 and the average family size was 3.03.

In the village, the population was spread out, with 24.8% under the age of 18, 4.9% from 18 to 24, 27.9% from 25 to 44, 31.4% from 45 to 64, and 11.1% who were 65 years of age or older. The median age was 39 years. For every 100 females, there were 96.5 males. For every 100 females age 18 and over, there were 100.0 males.

The median income for a household in the village was $56,406, and the median income for a family was $67,917. Males had a median income of $39,583 versus $28,125 for females. The per capita income for the village was $25,118. None of the families and 3.2% of the population were living below the poverty line.

== Education ==
It is in the West Platte County R-II School District.

== See also ==
- List of cities in Missouri
