= Platte Woods, Missouri =

- City
- Location of Platte Woods, Missouri
- Coordinates: 39°13′44″N 94°39′08″W
- Country: United States
- State: Missouri
- County: Platte
- Township: Fox

Area
  - Total: 0.39 sq mi (1.01 km^{2})
  - Land: 0.39 sq mi (1.01 km^{2})
  - Water: 0 sq mi (0.00 km^{2})
- Elevation: 1,024 ft (312 m)

Population (2020)
  - Total: 394
  - Density: 1,009.4/sq mi (389.72/km^{2})
- Time zone: UTC-6 (Central (CST))
  - Summer (DST): UTC-5 (CDT)
- ZIP code: 64151
- Area code: 816
- FIPS code: 29-58196
- GNIS feature ID: 2396227
- Website: cityofplattewoods.org

Platte Woods is a city in Platte County, Missouri and is part of the Kansas City metropolitan area within the United States. The population was 394 as of the 2020 census.

== Geography ==
According to the United States Census Bureau, the city has a total area of 0.37 square miles (0.96 km^{2}), all land.

== Demographics ==
Historical population
Census	Pop.	Note	%±
1950	159		—
1960	393		147.2%
1970	484		23.2%
1980	467		−3.5%
1990	427		−8.6%
2000	474		11.0%
2010	385		−18.8%
2020	394		2.3%
U.S. Decennial Census

=== 2010 census ===
As of the census of 2010, there were 385 people, 163 households, and 113 families living in the city. The population density was 1,040.5 inhabitants per square mile (401.7/km^{2}). There were 173 housing units at an average density of 467.6 per square mile (180.5/km^{2}). The racial makeup of the city was 95.1% White, 0.5% African American, 0.5% Native American, 2.1% Asian, and 1.8% from two or more races. Hispanic or Latino of any race were 3.6% of the population.

There were 163 households, of which 23.3% had children under the age of 18 living with them, 63.2% were married couples living together, 3.7% had a female householder with no husband present, 2.5% had a male householder with no wife present, and 30.7% were non-families. 25.8% of all households were made up of individuals, and 15.3% had someone living alone who was 65 years of age or older. The average household size was 2.36 and the average family size was 2.88.

The median age in the city was 49.8 years. 19.7% of residents were under the age of 18; 4.6% were between the ages of 18 and 24; 18.6% were from 25 to 44; 33.3% were from 45 to 64; and 23.9% were 65 years of age or older. The gender makeup of the city was 49.6% male and 50.4% female.

=== 2000 census ===
As of the census of 2000, there were 474 people, 220 households, and 137 families living in the city. The population density was 1,257.1 inhabitants per square mile (485.4/km^{2}). There were 262 housing units at an average density of 694.8 per square mile (268.3/km^{2}). The racial makeup of the city was 95.99% White, 2.53% African American, 0.21% Asian, 0.42% from other races, and 0.84% from two or more races. Hispanic or Latino of any race were 0.84% of the population.

There were 220 households, out of which 20.9% had children under the age of 18 living with them, 55.5% were married couples living together, 5.0% had a female householder with no husband present, and 37.7% were non-families. 31.4% of all households were made up of individuals, and 11.4% had someone living alone who was 65 years of age or older. The average household size was 2.15 and the average family size was 2.69.

In the city the population was spread out, with 18.1% under the age of 18, 6.1% from 18 to 24, 27.0% from 25 to 44, 28.3% from 45 to 64, and 20.5% who were 65 years of age or older. The median age was 44 years. For every 100 females, there were 91.1 males. For every 100 females age 18 and over, there were 86.5 males.

The median income for a household in the city was $64,375, and the median income for a family was $76,937. Males had a median income of $45,938 versus $35,417 for females. The per capita income for the city was $32,704. None of the families and 1.7% of the population were living below the poverty line, including no under eighteens and 3.5% of those over 64.

== Community and government ==
Platte Woods is a fourth class city under Missouri statutes. Its governing body consists of the Mayor and a four-member Board of Aldermen that cover two wards. Other decision making bodies include the Planning and Zoning Commission, Board of Zoning Adjustment, Administration Committee, Finances Committee, Public Works Committee, and the Public Safety Committee. City Hall staff includes a City Clerk and a Municipal Court Clerk.

Platte Woods has its own police department whose staff includes the chief of police and eight officers. The Municipal Court Judge and Prosecutor serve on a contract basis.

Platte Woods has two churches located within its limits, Platte Woods United Methodist, and Christ Lutheran Church.

== Education ==
It is in the Park Hill School District. It is zoned to Thomas B. Chinn Elementary School, Plaza Middle School, and Park Hill High School.

Metropolitan Community College has the Park Hill school district in its taxation area.
