= Dye, Missouri =

Extinct hamlet in Missouri, U.S.

Coordinates: 39°29′06″N 94°55′44″W

Dye is an unincorporated community in Platte County, in the U.S. state of Missouri. It is within the Kansas City metropolitan area. The former hamlet was located a few miles east of Iatan in eastern Marshall Township.

== History ==
A post office called Dye was established in 1888 and remained in operation until 1902. The community has the name of James Dye, the original owner of the site.
