= Ferrelview, Missouri =

Village in Platte County, Missouri, United States

- Village
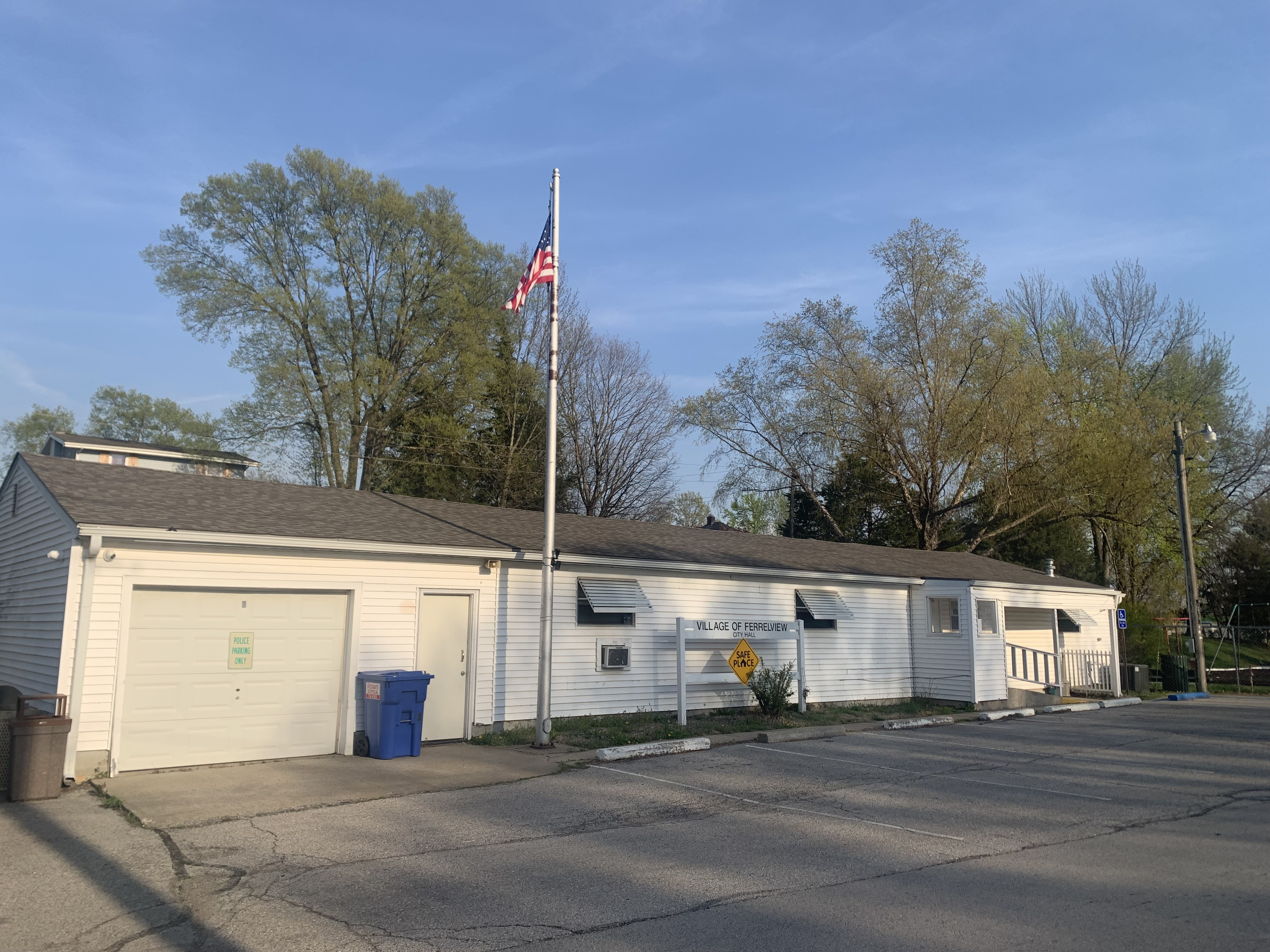
- Ferrelview City Hall

- Location of Ferrelview, Missouri
- Coordinates: 39°18′51″N 94°39′55″W
- Country: United States
- State: Missouri
- County: Platte
- Township: May
- Incorporated: 1928

Area
  - Total: 0.11 sq mi (0.29 km^{2})
  - Land: 0.11 sq mi (0.29 km^{2})
  - Water: 0 sq mi (0.00 km^{2})
- Elevation: 948 ft (289 m)

Population (2020)
  - Total: 642
  - Density: 5,772.7/sq mi (2,228.86/km^{2})
- Time zone: UTC-6 (Central (CST))
  - Summer (DST): UTC-5 (CDT)
- ZIP code: 64163
- Area codes: 816, 975
- FIPS code: 29-24058
- GNIS feature ID: 2398871
- Website: villageofferrelview.com

Ferrelview is a village in Platte County, Missouri, United States. It is within the Kansas City metropolitan area. The population was 642 at the 2020 census.

== History ==
A post office called Ferrelview was established in 1925, and remained in operation as an independent post office until 1962 and at that time became a sub contracted post office and served the community as a full service post office until December 1981. The community derives its name from Mollie Ferrel Heady, a local land owner.

== Geography ==
According to the United States Census Bureau, the village has a total area of 0.11 square miles (0.28 km^{2}), all land. Ferrelview is entirely surrounded by Kansas City.

== Demographics ==
Historical population
Census	Pop.	Note	%±
1930	116		—
1940	134		15.5%
1950	126		−6.0%
1960	158		25.4%
1970	140		−11.4%
1980	447		219.3%
1990	338		−24.4%
2000	593		75.4%
2010	451		−23.9%
2020	642		42.4%
U.S. Decennial Census

=== 2010 census ===
As of the census of 2010, there were 451 people, 236 households, and 86 families living in the village. The population density was 4,100.0 inhabitants per square mile (1,583.0/km^{2}). There were 300 housing units at an average density of 2,727.3 per square mile (1,053.0/km^{2}). The racial makeup of the village was 89.8% White, 3.5% African American, 0.7% Native American, 0.4% Asian, 1.3% Pacific Islander, and 4.2% from two or more races. Hispanic or Latino of any race were 6.2% of the population.

There were 236 households, of which 20.8% had children under the age of 18 living with them, 22.0% were married couples living together, 8.5% had a female householder with no husband present, 5.9% had a male householder with no wife present, and 63.6% were non-families. 55.5% of all households were made up of individuals, and 4.7% had someone living alone who was 65 years of age or older. The average household size was 1.91 and the average family size was 3.02.

The median age in the village was 39.1 years. 19.1% of residents were under the age of 18; 10.1% were between the ages of 18 and 24; 31.5% were from 25 to 44; 30.9% were from 45 to 64; and 8.4% were 65 years of age or older. The gender makeup of the village was 56.3% male and 43.7% female.

=== 2000 census ===
As of the census of 2000, there were 593 people, 302 households, and 119 families living in the village. The population density was 5,586.5 inhabitants per square mile (2,157.0/km^{2}). There were 334 housing units at an average density of 3,146.5 per square mile (1,214.9/km^{2}). The racial makeup of the village was 88.53% White, 3.37% African American, 0.17% Native American, 0.84% Asian, 1.52% from other races, and 5.56% from two or more races. Hispanic or Latino of any race were 3.71% of the population.

There were 302 households, out of which 21.9% had children under the age of 18 living with them, 27.5% were married couples living together, 8.6% had a female householder with no husband present, and 60.3% were non-families. 52.6% of all households were made up of individuals, and 5.0% had someone living alone who was 65 years of age or older. The average household size was 1.96 and the average family size was 3.08.

In the village, the population was spread out, with 24.6% under the age of 18, 9.3% from 18 to 24, 37.4% from 25 to 44, 22.8% from 45 to 64, and 5.9% who were 65 years of age or older. The median age was 34 years. For every 100 females, there were 134.4 males. For every 100 females age 18 and over, there were 139.0 males.

The median income for a household in the village was $32,750, and the median income for a family was $39,219. Males had a median income of $27,708 versus $23,125 for females. The per capita income for the village was $17,190. About 3.7% of families and 5.6% of the population were below the poverty line, including 3.7% of those under age 18 and none of those age 65 or over.

== Education ==
It is in the Platte County R-III School District. The zoned elementary school and middle school are Siegrist Elementary School and Platte City Middle School. Platte County High School is the district's comprehensive high school.

== See also ==
- List of cities in Missouri
