= Ridgely, Missouri =

Village in Platte County, Missouri, United States

- Village
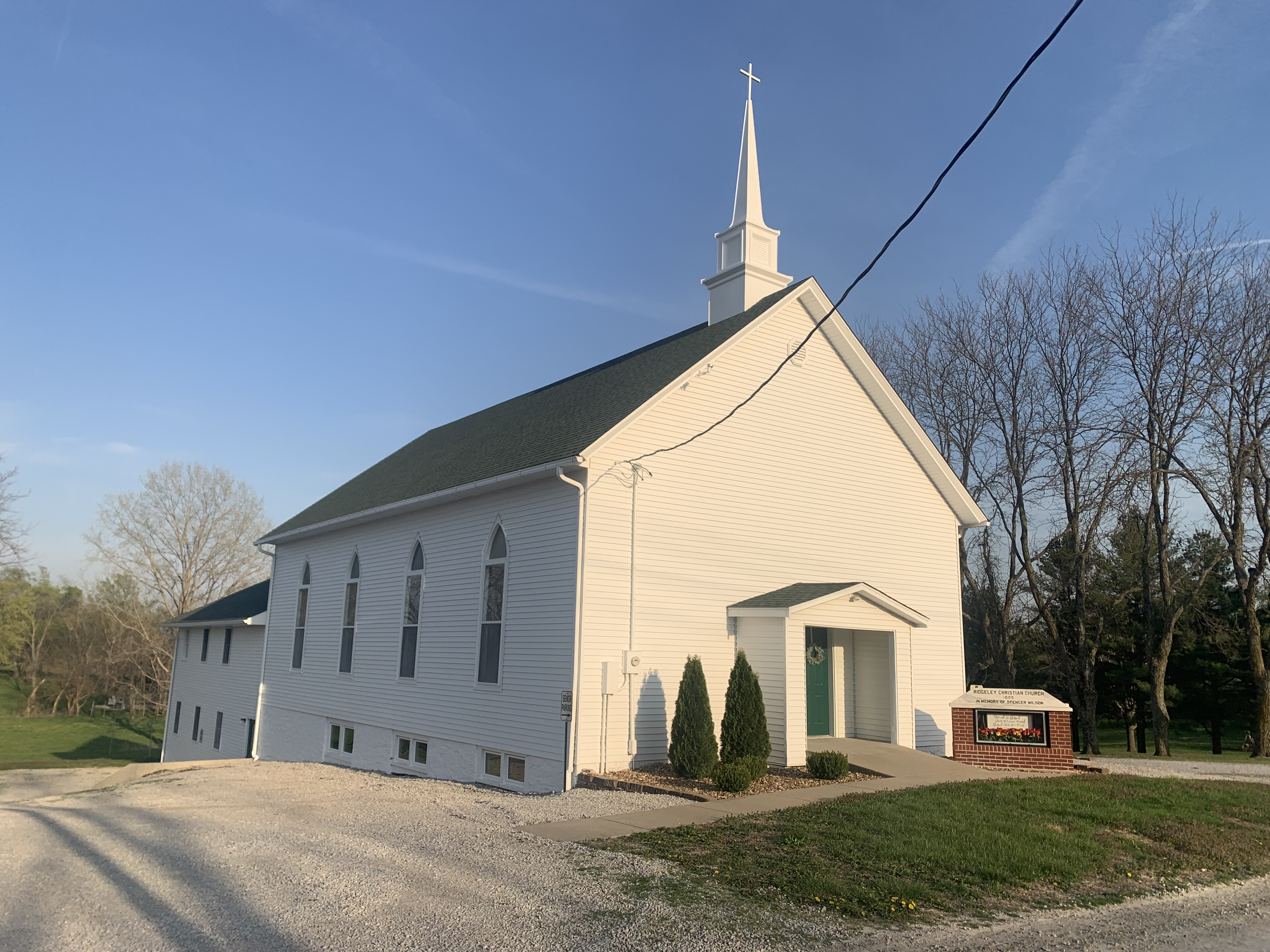
- Ridgely Christian Church

- Location of Ridgely, Missouri
- Coordinates: 39°27′13″N 94°38′25″W
- Country: United States
- State: Missouri
- County: Platte
- Township: Preston

Area
  - Total: 1.38 sq mi (3.57 km^{2})
  - Land: 1.38 sq mi (3.57 km^{2})
  - Water: 0 sq mi (0.00 km^{2})
- Elevation: 938 ft (286 m)

Population (2020)
  - Total: 95
  - Density: 68.9/sq mi (26.59/km^{2})
- Time zone: UTC-6 (Central (CST))
  - Summer (DST): UTC-5 (CDT)
- FIPS code: 29-61886
- GNIS feature ID: 2399072

Ridgely is a village in Platte County, Missouri, United States. As of the 2020 census, Ridgely had a population of 95. It lies within the Kansas City metropolitan area.

== History ==
A post office called Ridgely was established in 1848, and remained in operation until 1902. The community most likely was so named on account of its lofty elevation.

== Geography ==
According to the United States Census Bureau, the village has a total area of 1.44 square miles (3.73 km^{2}), all land.

== Demographics ==
Historical population
| Census | Pop. | Note | %± |
|---|---|---|---|
| 1860 | 165 | | — |
| 1870 | 121 | | −26.7% |
| 1880 | 84 | | −30.6% |
| 1970 | 53 | | — |
| 1980 | 78 | | 47.2% |
| 1990 | 57 | | −26.9% |
| 2000 | 64 | | 12.3% |
| 2010 | 104 | | 62.5% |
| 2020 | 95 | | −8.7% |
U.S. Decennial Census

=== 2010 census ===
As of the census of 2010, there were 104 people, 38 households, and 31 families living in the village. The population density was 72.2 inhabitants per square mile (27.9/km^{2}). There were 41 housing units at an average density of 28.5 per square mile (11.0/km^{2}). The racial makeup of the village was 100.0% White.

There were 38 households, of which 42.1% had children under the age of 18 living with them, 76.3% were married couples living together, 2.6% had a female householder with no husband present, 2.6% had a male householder with no wife present, and 18.4% were non-families. 15.8% of all households were made up of individuals, and 2.6% had someone living alone who was 65 years of age or older. The average household size was 2.74 and the average family size was 3.00.

The median age in the village was 38.8 years. 28.8% of residents were under the age of 18; 4.9% were between the ages of 18 and 24; 25% were from 25 to 44; 34.6% were from 45 to 64; and 6.7% were 65 years of age or older. The gender makeup of the village was 50.0% male and 50.0% female.

=== 2000 census ===
As of the census of 2000, there were 64 people, 23 households, and 14 families living in the village. The population density was 60.3 inhabitants per square mile (23.3/km^{2}). There were 24 housing units at an average density of 22.6 per square mile (8.7/km^{2}). The racial makeup of the village was 92.19% White, 7.81% from other races. Hispanic or Latino of any race were 7.81% of the population.

There were 23 households, out of which 34.8% had children under the age of 18 living with them, 56.5% were married couples living together, 8.7% had a female householder with no husband present, and 34.8% were non-families. 26.1% of all households were made up of individuals, and 4.3% had someone living alone who was 65 years of age or older. The average household size was 2.78 and the average family size was 3.47.

In the village, the population was spread out, with 29.7% under the age of 18, 3.1% from 18 to 24, 32.8% from 25 to 44, 20.3% from 45 to 64, and 14.1% who were 65 years of age or older. The median age was 35 years. For every 100 females, there were 93.9 males. For every 100 females age 18 and over, there were 87.5 males.

The median income for a household in the village was $29,000, and the median income for a family was $29,500. Males had a median income of $59,167 versus $21,667 for females. The per capita income for the village was $14,017. None of the population and none of the families were below the poverty line.

== Education ==
North Platte County R-I School District is the school district.

== See also ==
- List of cities in Missouri
