= Houston Lake, Missouri =

- City
- Location of Houston Lake, Missouri
- Coordinates: 39°11′33″N 94°37′25″W
- Country: United States
- State: Missouri
- County: Platte
- Township: Fox

Area
  - Total: 0.14 sq mi (0.36 km^{2})
  - Land: 0.12 sq mi (0.31 km^{2})
  - Water: 0.019 sq mi (0.05 km^{2})
- Elevation: 817 ft (249 m)

Population (2020)
  - Total: 229
  - Density: 1,910.0/sq mi (737.45/km^{2})
- Time zone: UTC-6 (Central (CST))
  - Summer (DST): UTC-5 (CDT)
- ZIP code: 64151
- Area code: 816
- FIPS code: 29-33292
- GNIS feature ID: 2394427
- Website: houstonlake.gov

Houston Lake is a city in Platte County, Missouri, and is part of the Kansas City metropolitan area within the United States. It is a private lake that is only available to residents of Houston Lake. The population was 229 at the 2020 census.

== Geography ==
According to the United States Census Bureau, the city has a total area of 0.14 square miles (0.36 km^{2}), of which 0.11 square miles (0.28 km^{2}) (78.57%) is land and 0.03 square miles (0.08 km^{2}) is water (21.43%).

== Demographics ==
Historical population
Census	Pop.	Note	%±
1960	289		—
1970	338		17.0%
1980	280		−17.2%
1990	303		8.2%
2000	284		−6.3%
2010	235		−17.3%
2020	229		−2.6%
U.S. Decennial Census

=== 2010 census ===
As of the census of 2010, there were 235 people, 107 households, and 64 families living in the city. The population density was 2,136.4 inhabitants per square mile (824.9/km^{2}). There were 119 housing units at an average density of 1,081.8 per square mile (417.7/km^{2}). The racial makeup of the city was 94.0% White, 0.4% African American, 3.0% from other races, and 2.6% from two or more races. Hispanic or Latino of any race were 4.7% of the population.

There were 107 households, of which 22.4% had children under the age of 18 living with them, 43.0% were married couples living together, 13.1% had a female householder with no husband present, 3.7% had a male householder with no wife present, and 40.2% were non-families. 34.6% of all households were made up of individuals, and 11.2% had someone living alone who was 65 years of age or older. The average household size was 2.20 and the average family size was 2.77.

The median age in the city was 51.4 years. 16.2% of residents were under the age of 18; 6% were between the ages of 18 and 24; 21.8% were from 25 to 44; 42% were from 45 to 64; and 14% were 65 years of age or older. The gender makeup of the city was 46.4% male and 53.6% female.

=== 2000 census ===
As of the census of 2000, there were 284 people, 119 households, and 69 families living in the city. The population density was 2,055.1 inhabitants per square mile (793.5/km^{2}). There were 123 housing units at an average density of 890.1 per square mile (343.7/km^{2}). The racial makeup of the city was 96.83% White, 0.70% African American, 0.35% Asian, and 2.11% from two or more races. Hispanic or Latino of any race were 3.52% of the population.

There were 119 households, out of which 27.7% had children under the age of 18 living with them, 44.5% were married couples living together, 11.8% had a female householder with no husband present, and 41.2% were non-families. 32.8% of all households were made up of individuals, and 8.4% had someone living alone who was 65 years of age or older. The average household size was 2.16 and the average family size was 2.69.

In the city the population was spread out, with 18.7% under the age of 18, 4.2% from 18 to 24, 28.9% from 25 to 44, 35.9% from 45 to 64, and 12.3% who were 65 years of age or older. The median age was 44 years. For every 100 females, there were 98.6 males. For every 100 females age 18 and over, there were 104.4 males.

The median income for a household in the city was $53,750, and the median income for a family was $61,875. Males had a median income of $48,750 versus $24,063 for females. The per capita income for the city was $24,471. About 1.5% of families and 4.0% of the population were below the poverty line, including 12.5% of those under the age of eighteen and none of those 65 or over.

== Education ==
It is in the Park Hill School District. It is zoned to Southeast Elementary School, Walden Middle School, and Park Hill South High School.

Metropolitan Community College has the Park Hill school district in its taxation area.
