= Lake Waukomis, Missouri =

- City
- Location of Lake Waukomis, Missouri
- Coordinates: 39°13′50″N 94°38′19″W
- Country: United States
- State: Missouri
- County: Platte
- Township: May

Area
  - Total: 0.42 sq mi (1.08 km^{2})
  - Land: 0.29 sq mi (0.76 km^{2})
  - Water: 0.12 sq mi (0.32 km^{2})
- Elevation: 938 ft (286 m)

Population (2020)
  - Total: 888
  - Density: 3,021.9/sq mi (1,166.75/km^{2})
- Time zone: UTC-6 (Central (CST))
  - Summer (DST): UTC-5 (CDT)
- ZIP code: 64151
- Area code: 816
- FIPS code: 29-40322
- GNIS feature ID: 2395605
- Website: www.lakewaukomis.org

Lake Waukomis is a city in Platte County, Missouri and is part of the Kansas City metropolitan area within the United States. The population was 888 at the 2020 census.

== Geography ==
According to the United States Census Bureau, the city has a total area of 0.39 square miles (1.01 km^{2}), of which 0.27 square miles (0.70 km^{2}) is land and 0.12 square miles (0.31 km^{2}) is water.

== Demographics ==
Historical population
| Census | Pop. | Note | %± |
|---|---|---|---|
| 1960 | 506 | | — |
| 1970 | 1,105 | | 118.4% |
| 1980 | 1,050 | | −5.0% |
| 1990 | 1,027 | | −2.2% |
| 2000 | 917 | | −10.7% |
| 2010 | 870 | | −5.1% |
| 2020 | 888 | | 2.1% |
U.S. Decennial Census

=== 2010 census ===
As of the census of 2010, there were 870 people, 401 households, and 259 families living in the city. The population density was 3,222.2 inhabitants per square mile (1,244.1/km^{2}). There were 436 housing units at an average density of 1,614.8 per square mile (623.5/km^{2}). The racial makeup of the city was 95.6% White, 1.3% Asian, 0.7% from other races, and 2.4% from two or more races. Hispanic or Latino of any race were 3.3% of the population.

There were 401 households, of which 20.2% had children under the age of 18 living with them, 55.6% were married couples living together, 5.7% had a female householder with no husband present, 3.2% had a male householder with no wife present, and 35.4% were non-families. 28.4% of all households were made up of individuals, and 12.7% had someone living alone who was 65 years of age or older. The average household size was 2.17 and the average family size was 2.65.

The median age in the city was 50.5 years. 16.4% of residents were under the age of 18; 5% were between the ages of 18 and 24; 19.1% were from 25 to 44; 37.8% were from 45 to 64; and 21.7% were 65 years of age or older. The gender makeup of the city was 47.7% male and 52.3% female.

=== 2000 census ===
As of the census of 2000, there were 917 people, 419 households, and 299 families living in the city. The population density was 3,460.2 inhabitants per square mile (1,336.0/km^{2}). There were 433 housing units at an average density of 1,633.9 per square mile (630.9/km^{2}). The racial makeup of the city was 98.15% White, 0.22% Native American, 0.76% Asian, 0.55% from other races, and 0.33% from two or more races. Hispanic or Latino of any race were 1.85% of the population.

There were 419 households, out of which 19.3% had children under the age of 18 living with them, 62.1% were married couples living together, 6.4% had a female householder with no husband present, and 28.6% were non-families. 24.8% of all households were made up of individuals, and 11.0% had someone living alone who was 65 years of age or older. The average household size was 2.19 and the average family size was 2.58.

In the city, the population was spread out, with 16.1% under the age of 18, 4.6% from 18 to 24, 24.8% from 25 to 44, 35.1% from 45 to 64, and 19.4% who were 65 years of age or older. The median age was 48 years. For every 100 females, there were 95.9 males. For every 100 females age 18 and over, there were 90.3 males.

The median income for a household in the city was $60,357, and the median income for a family was $69,375. Males had a median income of $51,190 versus $35,878 for females. The per capita income for the city was $30,840. None of the families and 1.0% of the population were living below the poverty line, including no under eighteens and none of those over 64.

== Education ==
It is in the Park Hill School District. It is zoned to Thomas B. Chinn Elementary School, Plaza Middle School, and Park Hill High School.

Metropolitan Community College has the Park Hill school district in its taxation area.
