= West Platte, Missouri =

Unincorporated community in Platte County, Missouri, United States

Coordinates: 39°23′25″N 94°50′24″W

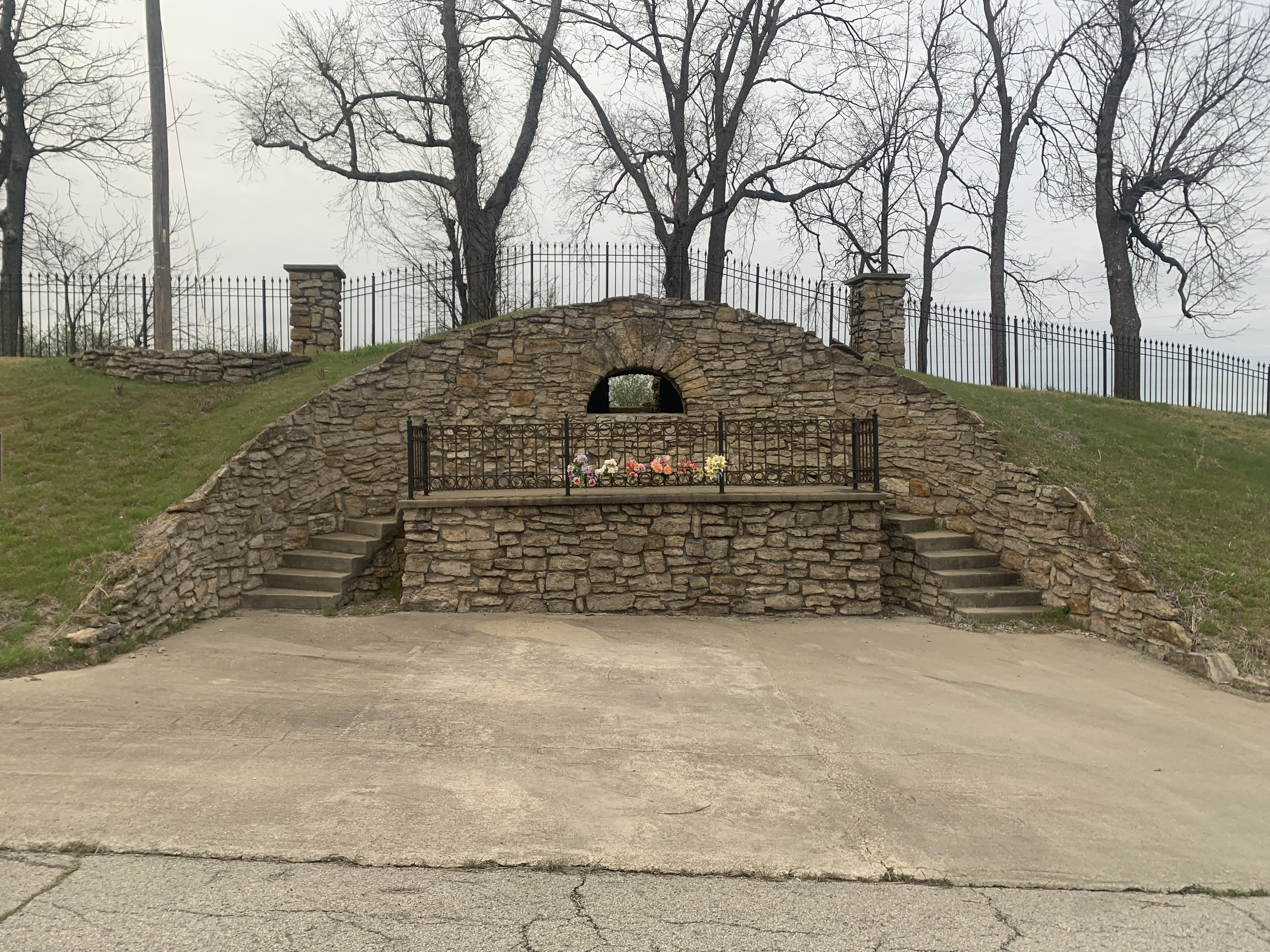
Site of Halfway house and stone basement at West Platte, April 2025

West Platte is an unincorporated community in Platte County, Missouri, United States that lies within the Kansas City metropolitan area.

== Description ==
The community lies west of Platte City, hence the name.

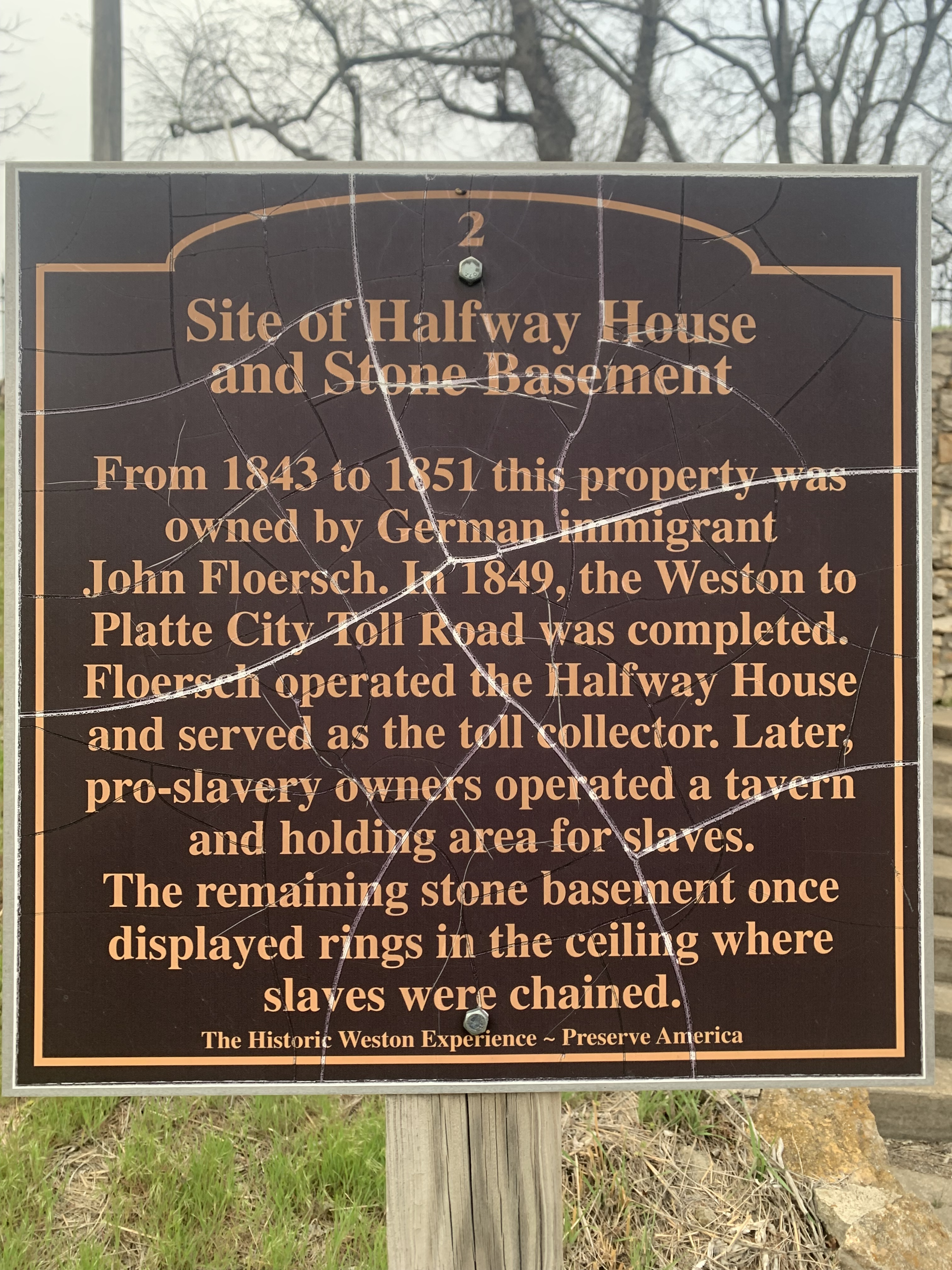
Plaque of halfway house and stone basement at West Platte, Missouri
