= Camden Point, Missouri =

- City
- Location of Camden Point, Missouri
- Coordinates: 39°27′08″N 94°44′44″W
- Country: United States
- State: Missouri
- County: Platte
- Township: Green
- Incorporated: 1962

Area
  - Total: 0.64 sq mi (1.66 km^{2})
  - Land: 0.64 sq mi (1.66 km^{2})
  - Water: 0 sq mi (0.00 km^{2})
- Elevation: 935 ft (285 m)

Population (2020)
  - Total: 457
  - Density: 714.3/sq mi (275.81/km^{2})
- Time zone: UTC-6 (Central (CST))
  - Summer (DST): UTC-5 (CDT)
- ZIP code: 64018
- Area codes: 816, 975
- FIPS code: 29-10792
- GNIS feature ID: 2393510
- Website: camdenpointmo.wordpress.com

Camden Point is a city in Platte County, Missouri, United States and is part of the Kansas City metropolitan area. The population was 457 at the 2020 census.

== History ==
A post office called Camden Point has been in operation since 1837. The name "Camden" most likely is a transfer from England, perhaps via another town in the United States.

== Geography ==
According to the United States Census Bureau, the city has a total area of 0.60 square miles (1.55 km^{2}), all land.

== Demographics ==
Historical population
Census	Pop.	Note	%±
1870	77		—
1880	142		84.4%
1890	177		24.6%
1900	170		−4.0%
1910	169		−0.6%
1920	212		25.4%
1930	192		−9.4%
1940	140		−27.1%
1950	147		5.0%
1960	171		16.3%
1970	264		54.4%
1980	263		−0.4%
1990	373		41.8%
2000	484		29.8%
2010	474		−2.1%
2020	457		−3.6%
U.S. Decennial Census

=== 2010 census ===
As of the census of 2010, there were 474 people, 174 households, and 133 families living in the city. The population density was 790.0 inhabitants per square mile (305.0/km^{2}). There were 189 housing units at an average density of 315.0 per square mile (121.6/km^{2}). The racial makeup of the city was 98.1% White, 0.6% African American, 0.4% Native American, 0.6% from other races, and 0.2% from two or more races. Hispanic or Latino of any race were 1.3% of the population.

There were 174 households, of which 38.5% had children under the age of 18 living with them, 66.1% were married couples living together, 5.7% had a female householder with no husband present, 4.6% had a male householder with no wife present, and 23.6% were non-families. 18.4% of all households were made up of individuals, and 6.9% had someone living alone who was 65 years of age or older. The average household size was 2.72 and the average family size was 3.14.

The median age in the city was 39.7 years. 26.2% of residents were under the age of 18; 6.4% were between the ages of 18 and 24; 26.8% were from 25 to 44; 29.7% were from 45 to 64; and 11% were 65 years of age or older. The gender makeup of the city was 50.2% male and 49.8% female.

=== 2000 census ===
As of the census of 2000, there were 484 people, 179 households, and 146 families living in the city. The population density was 826.3 inhabitants per square mile (319.0/km^{2}). There were 182 housing units at an average density of 310.7 per square mile (120.0/km^{2}). The racial makeup of the city was 97.93% White, 0.21% Native American, 0.41% from other races, and 1.45% from two or more races. Hispanic or Latino of any race were 0.62% of the population.

There were 179 households, out of which 43.6% had children under the age of 18 living with them, 72.6% were married couples living together, 6.1% had a female householder with no husband present, and 18.4% were non-families. 14.5% of all households were made up of individuals, and 5.6% had someone living alone who was 65 years of age or older. The average household size was 2.70 and the average family size was 3.02.

In the city the population was spread out, with 28.7% under the age of 18, 7.0% from 18 to 24, 34.3% from 25 to 44, 22.7% from 45 to 64, and 7.2% who were 65 years of age or older. The median age was 34 years. For every 100 females, there were 105.1 males. For every 100 females age 18 and over, there were 94.9 males.

The median income for a household in the city was $55,089, and the median income for a family was $57,344. Males had a median income of $39,750 versus $30,357 for females. The per capita income for the city was $22,429. About 4.4% of families and 5.0% of the population were below the poverty line, including 4.9% of those under age 18 and 11.8% of those age 65 or over.

== Education ==
North Platte County R-I School District is the school district. North Platte County R-I School District operates one school in the community: North Platte Elementary School.

Camden Point has a public library, a branch of the Mid-Continent Public Library.
