= Pettis Township, Platte County, Missouri =

Township in Platte County, Missouri, U.S.

Pettis Township
- Township
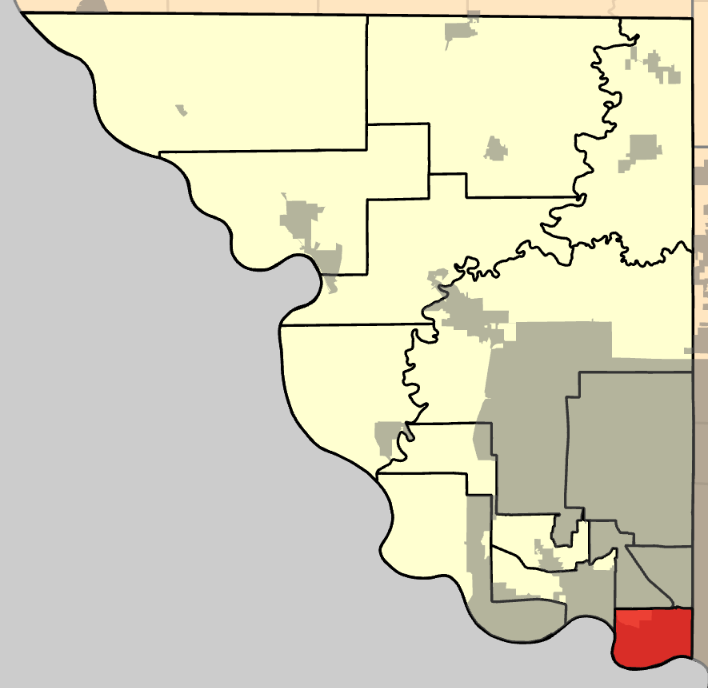
- Coordinates: 39°10′20″N 94°37′57″W
- Country: United States
- State: Missouri
- County: Platte

Area
  - Total: 6.91 sq mi (17.9 km^{2})
  - Land: 6.63 sq mi (17.2 km^{2})
  - Water: 0.28 sq mi (0.73 km^{2}) 4.05%
- Elevation: 755 ft (230 m)

Population (2020)
  - Total: 5,760
  - Density: 869.5/sq mi (335.7/km^{2})
- FIPS code: 29-16557242
- GNIS feature ID: 767205

Pettis Township is a township in Platte County, Missouri, United States. At the 2020 census, its population was 5,760.

Pettis Township was erected in 1839.
