= Woodruff, Missouri =

Unincorporated community in Missouri, U.S.

Coordinates: 39°26′38″N 94°49′00″W

Woodruff is an unincorporated community in Platte County, in the U.S. state of Missouri. It is part of the Kansas City metropolitan area.

== History ==
A post office called Woodruff was established in 1891, and remained in operation until 1924. The community has the name of Charles Woodruff, a personal acquaintance of a railroad employee.
