= Sioux Township, Platte County, Missouri =

Township in Platte County, Missouri, U.S.

Sioux Township
- Township
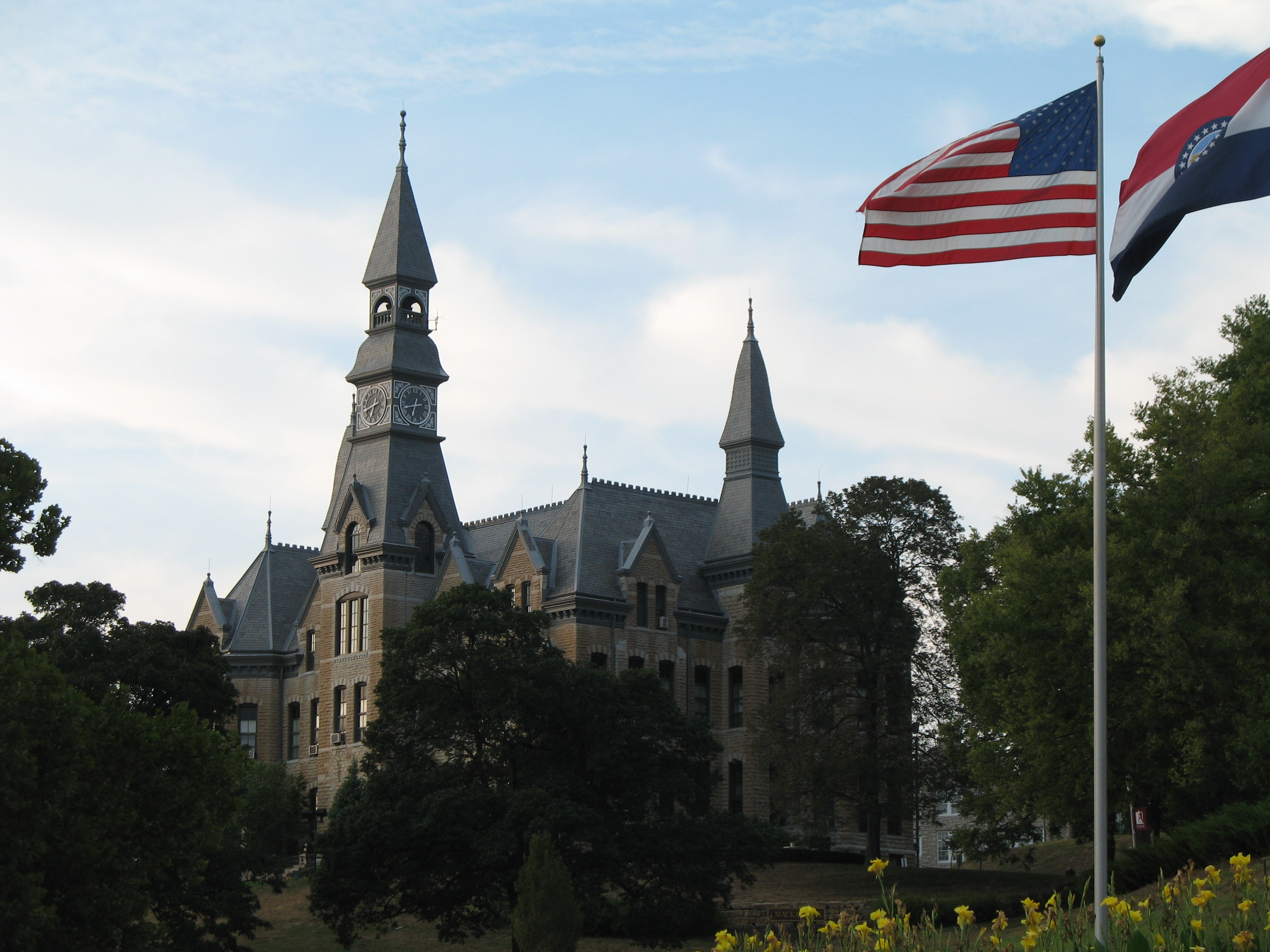
- McKay Hall of Parkville University in eastern Sioux Township

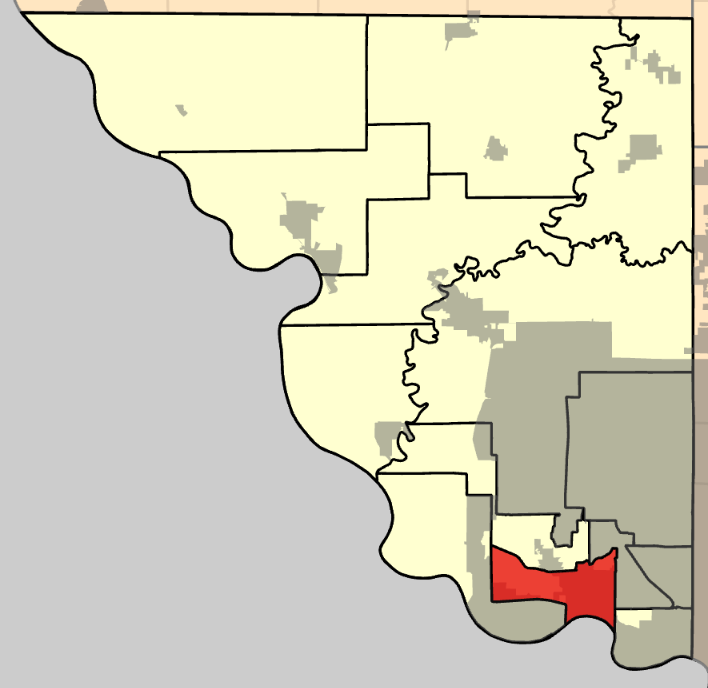
- Coordinates: 39°12′02″N 94°42′04″W
- Country: United States
- State: Missouri
- County: Platte

Area
  - Total: 9.28 sq mi (24.0 km^{2})
  - Land: 8.89 sq mi (23.0 km^{2})
  - Water: 0.39 sq mi (1.0 km^{2}) 4.2%
- Elevation: 896 ft (273 m)

Population (2020)
  - Total: 13,092
  - Density: 1,474/sq mi (569/km^{2})
- FIPS code: 29-16568073
- GNIS feature ID: 767207

Sioux Township is a township in Platte County, Missouri, United States. At the 2020 census, its population was 13,092.

Sioux Township, located in Platte County, Missouri, covers about 9.28 square miles, mostly land. It sits at an elevation of 896 feet. As of 2020, the population was around 13,092, with a density of 1,467 people per square mile.

The area is relatively wealthy, with a median household income of about $134,161 and a low poverty rate of 3.9%. The average household size is 2.7 people, and the median age is 38.5 years.

Many adults have college degrees, and most residents own their homes, which have a median value of around $443,900. The average commute time to work is about 23 minutes.
