= Stubbs, Missouri =

Unincorporated community in Missouri, U.S.

Coordinates: 39°25′30″N 94°45′04″W

Stubbs is an unincorporated community in Platte County, in the U.S. state of Missouri. It lies within the Kansas City metropolitan area.

== History ==
A variant name was "Stubbs Station". The community has the name of Robert Stubbs, the original owner of the site.
