= Platte County, Missouri =

County in Missouri, United States

- County
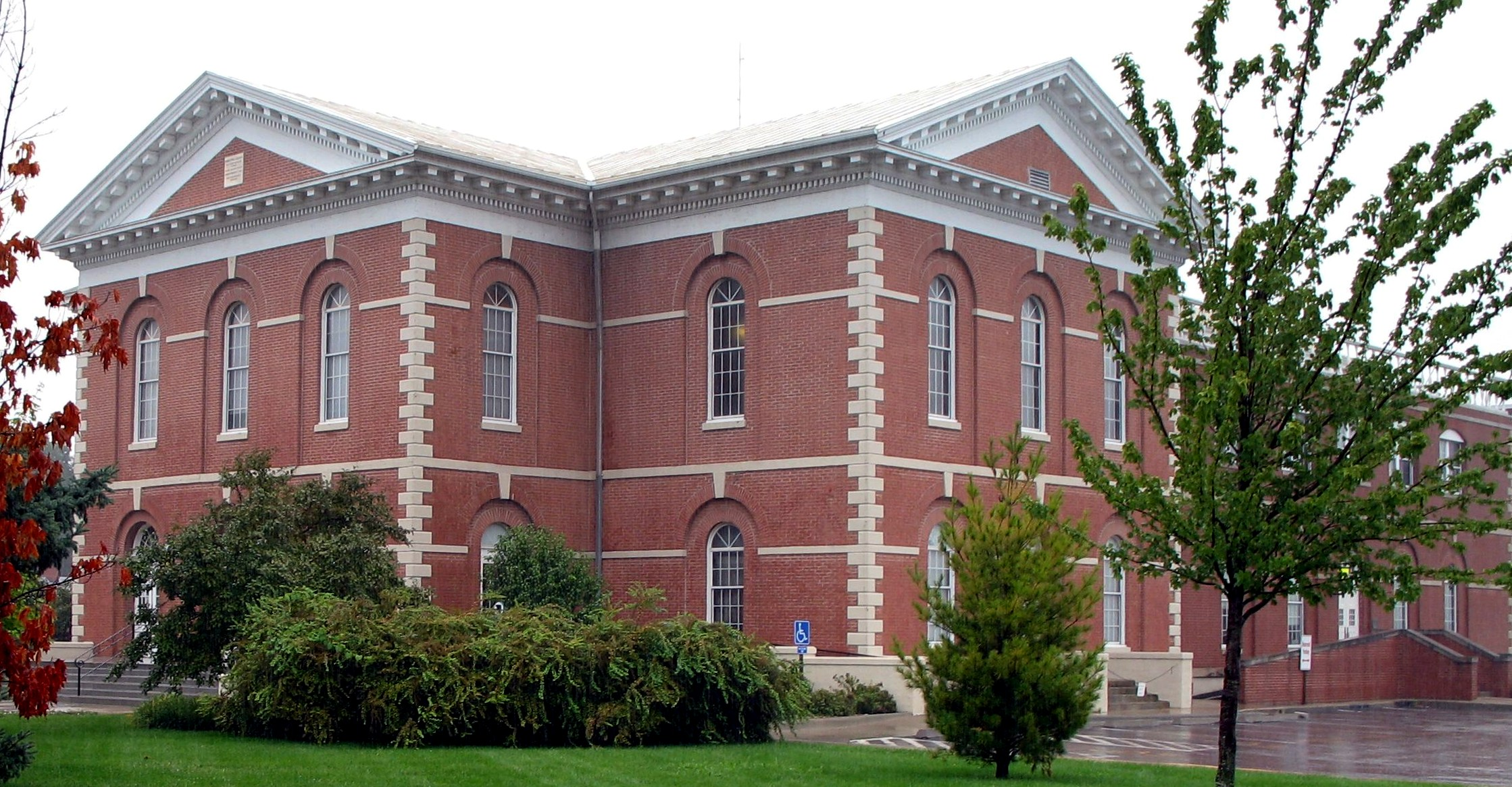
- Platte County Courthouse

- Location within the U.S. state of Missouri
- Coordinates: 39°23′N 94°46′W
- Country: United States
- State: Missouri
- Founded: December 31, 1838
- Named for: Platte River or Platte Purchase
- Seat: Platte City
- Largest city: Kansas City

Area
  - Total: 427 sq mi (1,110 km^{2})
  - Land: 420 sq mi (1,100 km^{2})
  - Water: 6.6 sq mi (17 km^{2}) 1.5%

Population (2020)
  - Total: 106,718
  - Estimate (2025): 114,400 ▲
  - Density: 250/sq mi (98/km^{2})
- Time zone: UTC−6 (Central)
  - Summer (DST): UTC−5 (CDT)
- Congressional district: 6th
- Website: www.co.platte.mo.us

Platte County is a county located in the northwestern portion of the U.S. state of Missouri and is part of the Kansas City metropolitan area. As of the 2020 census, the population was 106,718. Its county seat is Platte City. The county was organized December 31, 1838, from the Platte Purchase, named for the Platte River. (Platte is derived from the French word for a low, shallow, or intermittent stream.) The Kansas City International Airport is located in the county, approximately one mile west of Interstate 29 between mile markers 12 and 15. The land for the airport was originally in an unincorporated portion of Platte County before being annexed by Platte City, and eventually Kansas City.

== Geography ==
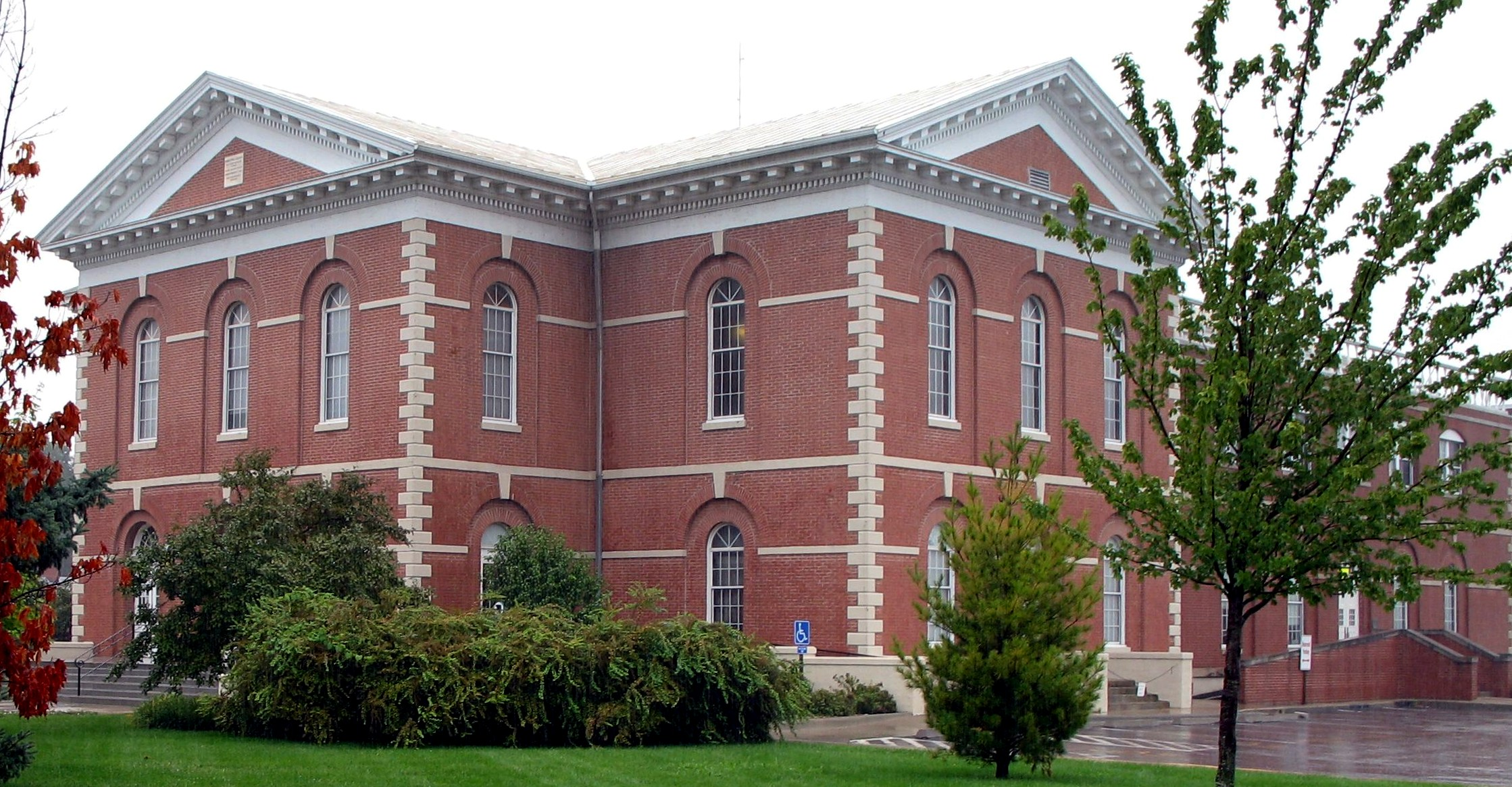
Platte County Courthouse in Platte City was built after the original courthouse was burned with the rest of Platte City during the American Civil War. Blanche Barrow was held at the adjoining jail following a Bonnie & Clyde shootout just south of Platte City.

According to the U.S. Census Bureau, the county has a total area of 427 square miles (1,110 km^{2}), of which 420 square miles (1,100 km^{2}) is land and 6.6 square miles (17 km^{2}) (1.5%) is water. The county's southwestern border with Kansas is formed by the Missouri River.

=== Adjacent counties ===
- Buchanan County (north)
- Clinton County (northeast)
- Clay County (east)
- Wyandotte County, Kansas (south)
- Leavenworth County, Kansas (southwest)
- Atchison County, Kansas (northwest)

=== Major highways ===
- Interstate 29
- Interstate 435
- Interstate 635
- U.S. Route 69
- U.S. Route 71
- Route 9
- Route 45
- Route 92
- Route 152
- Route 273
- Route 371

== Demographics ==
Historical population
Census	Pop.	Note	%±
1840	8,913		—
1850	16,845		89.0%
1860	18,350		8.9%
1870	17,352		−5.4%
1880	17,366		0.1%
1890	16,278		−6.3%
1900	16,193		−0.5%
1910	14,429		−10.9%
1920	13,996		−3.0%
1930	13,819		−1.3%
1940	13,862		0.3%
1950	14,973		8.0%
1960	23,350		55.9%
1970	32,081		37.4%
1980	46,341		44.4%
1990	57,867		24.9%
2000	73,781		27.5%
2010	89,322		21.1%
2020	106,718		19.5%
2025 (est.)	114,400	▲	7.2%
U.S. Decennial Census; 1790-1960 1900-1990; 1990-2000 2010-2020

=== 2020 census ===
As of the 2020 census, the county had a population of 106,718. The median age was 38.3 years. 23.9% of residents were under the age of 18 and 15.0% of residents were 65 years of age or older. For every 100 females there were 96.3 males, and for every 100 females age 18 and over there were 94.2 males age 18 and over.

The racial makeup of the county was 78.3% White, 7.8% Black or African American, 0.5% American Indian and Alaska Native, 2.6% Asian, 0.7% Native Hawaiian and Pacific Islander, 2.0% from some other race, and 8.2% from two or more races. Hispanic or Latino residents of any race comprised 6.7% of the population.

86.4% of residents lived in urban areas, while 13.6% lived in rural areas.

There were 42,452 households in the county, of which 32.4% had children under the age of 18 living with them and 24.1% had a female householder with no spouse or partner present. About 26.8% of all households were made up of individuals and 9.2% had someone living alone who was 65 years of age or older.

There were 45,307 housing units, of which 6.3% were vacant. Among occupied housing units, 65.0% were owner-occupied and 35.0% were renter-occupied. The homeowner vacancy rate was 1.2% and the rental vacancy rate was 9.2%.

=== Racial and ethnic composition ===
Platte County, Missouri – Racial and ethnic composition Note: the US Census treats Hispanic/Latino as an ethnic category. This table excludes Latinos from the racial categories and assigns them to a separate category. Hispanics/Latinos may be of any race.
Race / Ethnicity (NH = Non-Hispanic)	Pop 1980	Pop 1990	Pop 2000	Pop 2010	Pop 2020	% 1980	% 1990	% 2000	% 2010	% 2020
White alone (NH)	44,608	54,438	66,230	75,135	81,426	96.26%	94.07%	89.77%	84.12%	76.30%
Black or African American alone (NH)	568	1,195	2,542	5,147	8,135	1.23%	2.07%	3.45%	5.76%	7.62%
Native American or Alaska Native alone (NH)	137	298	303	370	391	0.30%	0.51%	0.41%	0.41%	0.37%
Asian alone (NH)	329	762	1,084	2,031	2,721	0.71%	1.32%	1.47%	2.27%	2.55%
Native Hawaiian or Pacific Islander alone (NH)	x	x	148	287	695	x	x	0.20%	0.32%	0.65%
Other race alone (NH)	159	13	77	123	459	0.34%	0.02%	0.10%	0.14%	0.43%
Mixed race or Multiracial (NH)	x	x	1,186	1,805	5,730	x	x	1.61%	2.02%	5.37%
Hispanic or Latino (any race)	540	1,161	2,211	4,424	7,161	1.17%	2.01%	3.00%	4.95%	6.71%
Total	46,341	57,867	73,781	89,322	106,718	100.00%	100.00%	100.00%	100.00%	100.00%

=== 2000 census ===
As of the census of 2000, there were 73,781 people, 29,278 households, and 20,231 families residing in the county. The population density was 176 people per square mile (68 people/km^{2}). There were 30,902 housing units at an average density of 74 units per square mile (29/km^{2}). The racial makeup of the county was 91.45% White, 3.49% Black or African American, 0.46% Native American, 1.48% Asian, 0.20% Pacific Islander, 1.05% from other races, and 1.87% from two or more races. Approximately 3.00% of the population were Hispanic or Latino of any race. 23.4% were of German, 12.5% Irish, 12.2% American and 11.4% English ancestry.

There were 29,278 households, out of which 34.10% had children under the age of 18 living with them, 57.00% were married couples living together, 8.80% had a female householder with no husband present, and 30.90% were non-families. 24.90% of all households were made up of individuals, and 6.00% had someone living alone who was 65 years of age or older. The average household size was 2.49 and the average family size was 3.00.

In the county, the population was spread out, with 25.80% under the age of 18, 8.30% from 18 to 24, 32.60% from 25 to 44, 24.50% from 45 to 64, and 8.80% who were 65 years of age or older. The median age was 36 years. For every 100 females there were 98.10 males. For every 100 females age 18 and over, there were 95.50 males.

The median income for a household in the county was $55,849, and the median income for a family was $65,236. Males had a median income of $44,310 versus $31,005 for females. The per capita income for the county was $26,356. About 3.30% of families and 4.80% of the population were below the poverty line, including 5.70% of those under age 18 and 5.70% of those age 65 or over.

== Education ==
=== School districts ===
School districts (all full K-12) include:

- East Buchanan County C-1 School District
- North Kansas City School District
- North Platte County R-I School District
- Park Hill School District
- Platte County School District Number 3
- Smithville R-II School District
- West Platte County R-II School District

=== Public schools ===
- North Platte R-I School District – Dearborn
  - North Platte Elementary School (PK-03)
  - North Platte Intermediate School (04-06)
  - North Platte Junior High School (07-08)
  - North Platte High School (09-12)
- Park Hill School District – Kansas City
  - Russell Jones Education Center (K-12) – (Special Education)
  - Hopewell Elementary School (K-05)
  - Alfred L. Renner Elementary School (K-05)
  - Thomas B. Chinn Elementary School (K-05)
  - English Landing Elementary School (K-05)
  - Graden Elementary School (K-05)
  - Hawthorn Elementary School (K-05)
  - Line Creek Elementary School (K-05)
  - Gerner Family Early Education Center (PK)
  - Prairie Point Elementary School (K-05)
  - Southeast Elementary School (K-05)
  - Tiffany Ridge Elementary School (K-05)
  - Union Chapel Elementary School (K-05)
  - Congress Middle School (06-08)
  - Lakeview Middle School (06-08)
  - Plaza Middle School (06-08)
  - Walden Middle School (06-08)
  - Park Hill High School (09-12) -- within Kansas City city limits
  - Park Hill South High School (09-12) – Riverside
  - LEAD Innovation Studio (09-12)
- Platte County School District Number 3 – Platte City
  - Donald D. Siegrist Elementary School (K-5)
  - Pathfinder Elementary School (PK-5)
  - Compass Elementary School (PK-5)
  - Barry Elementary School (PK-5)
  - Platte Purchase Middle School (06-08)
  - Platte City Middle School (06-08)
  - Platte County High School (09-12)
- West Platte County R-II School District – Weston
  - Central Elementary School (PK-06)
  - West Platte County High School (07-12)

=== Private schools ===
- Clay-Platte Children's House Montessori School – Kansas City (PK-08) – Nonsectarian
- Martin Luther Academy – Kansas City (K-08) – Lutheran
- Northland Christian Education System – Kansas City (PK-12) – Nondenominational Christian
- St. Therese School – Kansas City (K-08) – Roman Catholic
- Prairie View KinderCare – Kansas City (NS/PK) – Nonsectarian
- Christ Lutheran Pre-Kindergarten School – Platte Woods (NS/PK) – Lutheran
- Our Savior Christian Academy - Platte City and Smithville (PK-12)

=== College and universities ===
Metropolitan Community College has a service area that includes all of the county, though only the portion in the Park Hill school district is in the community college district's in-district taxation zone.

=== Public libraries ===
- Mid-Continent Public Library

== Communities ==
=== Cities ===
- Camden Point
- Dearborn
- Edgerton
- Houston Lake
- Kansas City (partly in Jackson and Clay counties and a small part in Cass County)
- Lake Waukomis
- Northmoor
- Parkville
- Platte City (county seat)
- Platte Woods
- Riverside
- Smithville (mostly in Clay County)
- Tracy
- Weatherby Lake
- Weston

=== Villages ===
- Farley
- Ferrelview
- Iatan
- Ridgely

=== Civil townships ===
- Carroll
- Fair
- Fox
- Green
- Kickapoo
- Lee
- Marshall
- May
- Pawnee
- Pettis
- Preston
- Sioux
- Waldron
- Weston

=== Census-designated place ===
- New Market

=== Unincorporated communities ===
- Beverly
- Dye
- East Leavenworth
- Edgerton Junction
- Hoover
- Kerrville
- Stillings
- Stubbs
- Waldron
- West Platte
- Woodruff

=== Population ranking ===
The population ranking of the following table is based on the 2020 US census of Platte County.

† County seat
†† Partly within adjacent counties

Rank	Name	Municipal Type	Population
1	Kansas City ††	Home Rule	508,090
2	Smithville ††	4th Class City	10,406
3	Parkville	4th Class City	7,117
4	Platte City †	4th Class City	4,784
5	Riverside	4th Class City	4,013
6	Weatherby Lake	4th Class City	2,077
7	Weston	4th Class City	1,756
8	Lake Waukomis	4th Class City	888
9	Ferrelview	Village	642
10	Edgerton	4th Class City	601
11	Dearborn	4th Class City	482
12	Camden Point	4th Class City	457
13	Platte Woods	4th Class City	394
14	Northmoor	4th Class City	291
15	Tracy	4th Class City	269
16	Farley	Village	265
17	Houston Lake	4th Class City	229
18	Ridgely	Village	95
19	New Market	Census-designated place	88
20	Iatan	Village	39

== Politics ==
=== Local ===
Platte County, Missouri

Elected countywide officials
Assessor	Marcus Farr	Republican
Auditor	Kevin Robinson	Republican
County Clerk	Jera Pruitt	Republican
Collector	Sheila L. Palmer	Republican
Commissioner (presiding)	Scott Fricker	Republican
Commissioner (district 1)	Allyson Berberich	Republican
Commissioner (district 2)	Joe Vanover	Republican
Prosecuting Attorney	Eric Zahnd	Republican
Public Administrator	Shanna Burns	Republican
Recorder	Christopher L. Wright	Republican
Sheriff	Erik Holland	Republican
Treasurer	Chris Kendall	Independent

The Republican Party controls politics at the local level in Platte County. Republicans hold all of the elected positions in the county. However, Governor Jay Nixon carried the county in his two successful elections, and in 2004, Claire McCaskill of Jackson County narrowly won a majority of the county's votes over Republican victor Matt Blunt. While the county has swung to the Republican party, the presence of Kansas City has helped keep the county competitive into the 21st century.

=== State ===
Past Gubernatorial Elections Results
Year	Republican	Democratic	Third Parties
2024	52.31% 30,102	45.75% 26,328	1.94% 1,114
2020	51.84% 29,616	46.02% 26,293	2.14% 1,222
2016	50.20% 24,738	46.62% 22,973	2.58% 1,269
2012	44.64% '20,154	52.39% 23,654	2.97% 1,339
2008	42.51% 19,417	55.23% 25,228	2.26% 1,032
2004	48.31% 20,137	50.31% 20,970	1.32% 577
2000	50.23% 16,971	47.69% 16,115	2.08% 703
1996	36.40% 10,581	61.37% 17,840	2.23% 647

Platte County is divided into three legislative districts in the Missouri House of Representatives, two held by Republicans and one held by a Democrat.

- District 12 — Mike Jones (R-Kansas City). Consists of Parkville, Riverside, and Platte Woods.

Missouri House of Representatives - District 12 (2024)
Party	Candidate	Votes	%	±%
Republican	Mike Jones	10,131	50.40%	+2.56%
Democratic	Jamie Johnson	9,952	49.51%	−2.65%

Missouri House of Representatives — District 12 — Platte County (2022)
Party	Candidate	Votes	%	±%
Democratic	Jamie Johnson	7,399	52.16%	
Republican	Tom Hutsler	6,785	47.84%	

- District 13 — Sean Pouche (R-Kansas City). Consists of the communities of Platte City, Weston, Farley, Ferrelview, and a part of the city of Kansas City. District 13 also consists of portions of Buchanan County.

Missouri House of Representatives - District 13 - Platte County (2024)
Party	Candidate	Votes	%	±%
Republican	Sean Pouche	10,546	63.48%	−36.52%
Democratic	Andrea Denning	6,049	36.41%	

Missouri House of Representatives — District 13 — Platte County (2022)
Party	Candidate	Votes	%	±%
Republican	Sean Pouche	9,323	100%	+43.39%

Missouri House of Representatives — District 13 — Platte County (2020)
Party	Candidate	Votes	%	±%
Republican	Sean Pouche	14,054	56.61%	
Democratic	Vic Abundis	10,774	43.39%	

Missouri House of Representatives — District 13 — Platte County (2020)
Party	Candidate	Votes	%	±%
Republican	Vic Allred	10,575	54.34%	
Democratic	Mitch Weber	8,864	45.55%	

Missouri House of Representatives — District 13 — Platte County (2016)
Party	Candidate	Votes	%	±%
Republican	Nick Marshall	12,440	59.02%	−40.98
Democratic	Tyler McCall	8,636	40.98%	+40.98

Missouri House of Representatives — District 13 — Platte County (2014)
Party	Candidate	Votes	%	±%
Republican	Nick Marshall	7,539	100.00%	+38.04

Missouri House of Representatives — District 13 — Platte County (2012)
Party	Candidate	Votes	%	±%
Republican	Nick Marshall	11,712	61.96%	
Democratic	Gerry Byrne	7,192	38.04	

- District 14 – Ashley Aune (D-Kansas City). Consists of the communities of Houston Lake, Lake Waukomis, Weatherby Lake, Northmoor, and part of the city of Kansas City.

Missouri House of Representatives - District 14 - Platte County (2024)
Party	Candidate	Votes	%	±%
Democratic	Ashley Aune	10,959	54.46%	+1.24%
Republican	Frank Pendleton	9,132	45.38%	−1.40%

Missouri House of Representatives — District 14 — Platte County (2022)
Party	Candidate	Votes	%	±%
Democratic	Ashley Aune	7,859	53.22%	+0.22%
Republican	Eric Holmes	6,907	46.78%	−0.22%

Missouri House of Representatives — District 14 — Platte County (2020)
Party	Candidate	Votes	%	±%
Democratic	Ashley Aune	12,076	53.00%	
Republican	Eric Holmes	10,707	47.00%	

Missouri House of Representatives — District 14 — Platte County (2018)
Party	Candidate	Votes	%	±%
Republican	Kevin Corlew	8,716	50.17%	−2.49
Democratic	Matt Sain	8,656	49.83%	+2.49

Missouri House of Representatives — District 14 — Platte County (2016)
Party	Candidate	Votes	%	±%
Republican	Kevin Corlew	10,084	52.66%	−3.55
Democratic	Martin T. Rucker II	9,067	47.34%	+3.55

Missouri House of Representatives — District 14 — Platte County (2014)
Party	Candidate	Votes	%	±%
Republican	Kevin Corlew	4,812	56.21%	+1.40
Democratic	Stephanie Isaacson	3,749	43.79	−1.40

Missouri House of Representatives — District 14 — Platte County (2012)
Party	Candidate	Votes	%	±%
Republican	Ron Schieber	9,459	54.81%	
Democratic	Eric Pendell	7,799	45.19%	

Along with Buchanan County, all of Platte County is a part of Missouri's 34th District in the Missouri Senate and is currently represented by Tony Luetkemeyer (R-Parkville).

Missouri Senate — District 34 — Platte County (2022)
Party	Candidate	Votes	%	±%
Republican	Tony Luetkemeyer	22,503	55.07%	+3.30%
Democratic	Sarah Shorter	18,356	44.93%	−3.11%

Missouri Senate — District 34 — Platte County (2018)
Party	Candidate	Votes	%	±%
Republican	Tony Luetkemeyer	22,751	51.77%	
Democratic	Martin T. Rucker II	21,113	48.04%	

Missouri Senate — District 34 — Platte County (2014)
Party	Candidate	Votes	%	±%
Republican	Rob Schaaf	13,071	59.26%	
Democratic	Martin T. Rucker	8,987	40.74%	

=== Federal ===
U.S. Senate - Missouri - Platte County (2024)
Party	Candidate	Votes	%	±%
Republican	Josh Hawley	28,061	48.53%	−0.85%
Democratic	Lucas Kunce	28,351	49.03%	+0.59%
Libertarian	W.C. Young	670	1.16%	−0.50%
Better Party	Jared Young	354	0.61%	
Green	Nathan Kline	317	0.55%	

U.S. Senate — Missouri — Platte County (2022)
Party	Candidate	Votes	%	±%
Republican	Eric Schmitt	20,304	49.38%	+0.79%
Democratic	Trudy Busch Valentine	19,918	48.44%	+0.17%
Libertarian	Jonathan Dine	683	1.66%	+0.54%
Constitution	Paul Venable	215	0.52%	+0.52%

U.S. Senate — Missouri — Platte County (2018)
Party	Candidate	Votes	%	±%
Republican	Josh Hawley	21,618	48.59%	
Democratic	Claire McCaskill	21,477	48.27%	
Independent	Craig O'Dear	670	1.51%	
Libertarian	Japheth Campbell	499	1.12%	
Green	Jo Crain	200	0.45%	

U.S. Senate — Missouri — Platte County (2016)
Party	Candidate	Votes	%	±%
Republican	Roy Blunt	22,929	46.76%	+6.99
Democratic	Jason Kander	23,795	48.52%	−3.96
Libertarian	Jonathan Dine	1,413	2.88%	−4.87
Green	Johnathan McFarland	530	1.08%	+1.08
Constitution	Fred Ryman	371	0.76%	+0.76

U.S. Senate — Missouri — Platte County (2012)
Party	Candidate	Votes	%	±%
Republican	Todd Akin	17,870	39.77%	
Democratic	Claire McCaskill	23,578	52.48%	
Libertarian	Jonathan Dine	3,480	7.75%	

All of Platte County is included in Missouri's 6th Congressional District. It is currently represented by Sam Graves (R-Tarkio) in the U.S. House of Representatives.

U.S. House of Representatives - Missouri's 6th Congressional District - Platte County (2024)
Party	Candidate	Votes	%	±%
Republican	Sam Graves	31,127	54.52%	+0.11%
Democratic	Pam May	24,611	43.11%	−0.26%
Libertarian	Andy Maidment	894	1.57%	
Green	Mike Diel	401	0.70%	

U.S. House of Representatives — Missouri's 6th Congressional District — Platte County (2022)
Party	Candidate	Votes	%	±%
Republican	Sam Graves	22,310	54.41%	−0.97%
Democratic	Henry Martin	17,827	43.37%	+0.92%
Independent	Edward A (Andy) Maidment	870	2.12%	

U.S. House of Representatives – Missouri’s 6th Congressional District – Platte County (2020)
Party	Candidate	Votes	%	±%
Republican	Sam Graves	31,344	55.38%	
Democratic	Gena Ross	24,026	42.45%	
Libertarian	Jim Higgins	1,225	2.16%	

U.S. House of Representatives – Missouri’s 6th Congressional District – Platte County (2018)
Party	Candidate	Votes	%	±%
Republican	Sam Graves	24,518	55.45%	
Democratic	Henry Robert Martin	18,583	42.03%	
Libertarian	Dan Hogan	1,088	2.46%	

U.S. House of Representatives – Missouri’s 6th Congressional District – Platte County (2016)
Party	Candidate	Votes	%	±%
Republican	Sam Graves	29,596	60.91%	−1.12
Democratic	David M. Blackwell	17,016	35.02%	+1.33
Libertarian	Russ Lee Monchil	1,321	2.72%	−1.56
Green	Mike Diel	653	1.34%	+1.34

U.S. House of Representatives — Missouri's 6th Congressional District — Platte County (2014)
Party	Candidate	Votes	%	±%
Republican	Sam Graves	13,780	62.03%	−0.01
Democratic	Bill Hedge	7,483	33.69%	−1.66
Libertarian	Russ Lee Monchil	951	4.28%	+1.67

U.S. House of Representatives — Missouri's 6th Congressional District — Platte County (2012)
Party	Candidate	Votes	%	±%
Republican	Sam Graves	27,641	62.04%	
Democratic	Kyle Yarber	15,753	35.35%	
Libertarian	Russ Lee Monchil	1,162	2.61%	

United States presidential election results for Platte County, Missouri
Year	Republican		Democratic		Third party(ies)	
Year	No.	%	No.	%	No.	%
1888	1,010	26.75%	2,727	72.24%	38	1.01%
1892	885	23.71%	2,664	71.38%	183	4.90%
1896	1,044	24.47%	3,191	74.80%	31	0.73%
1900	997	24.45%	3,052	74.86%	28	0.69%
1904	953	27.06%	2,537	72.03%	32	0.91%
1908	982	25.84%	2,795	73.53%	24	0.63%
1912	510	14.80%	2,535	73.58%	400	11.61%
1916	921	23.52%	2,974	75.96%	20	0.51%
1920	1,724	28.25%	4,361	71.47%	17	0.28%
1924	1,999	34.80%	3,674	63.96%	71	1.24%
1928	2,423	41.94%	3,344	57.88%	10	0.17%
1932	1,160	18.24%	5,179	81.46%	19	0.30%
1936	1,787	26.71%	4,884	72.99%	20	0.30%
1940	2,545	35.38%	4,635	64.44%	13	0.18%
1944	2,344	38.47%	3,741	61.40%	8	0.13%
1948	1,644	27.34%	4,354	72.40%	16	0.27%
1952	3,390	42.36%	4,604	57.53%	9	0.11%
1956	3,596	40.55%	5,271	59.45%	0	0.00%
1960	4,771	44.88%	5,860	55.12%	0	0.00%
1964	3,059	33.24%	6,143	66.76%	0	0.00%
1968	4,836	42.74%	4,665	41.22%	1,815	16.04%
1972	8,764	67.69%	4,183	32.31%	0	0.00%
1976	8,103	47.51%	8,651	50.73%	300	1.76%
1980	10,092	53.81%	7,342	39.14%	1,322	7.05%
1984	12,859	62.64%	7,668	37.36%	0	0.00%
1988	11,838	51.18%	11,225	48.53%	66	0.29%
1992	9,380	31.82%	10,920	37.04%	9,178	31.14%
1996	13,332	45.36%	12,705	43.23%	3,352	11.41%
2000	17,785	52.23%	15,325	45.00%	944	2.77%
2004	23,302	55.52%	18,412	43.87%	256	0.61%
2008	24,460	52.44%	21,459	46.01%	721	1.55%
2012	25,618	56.04%	19,175	41.95%	917	2.01%
2016	25,933	52.28%	20,057	40.43%	3,618	7.29%
2020	28,917	50.49%	27,179	47.46%	1,174	2.05%
2024	29,381	50.82%	27,566	47.68%	870	1.50%

=== Missouri presidential preference primary (2008) ===
Former U.S. Senator Hillary Clinton (D-New York) received more votes, a total of 5,434, than any candidate from either party in Platte County during the 2008 presidential primary.

== See also ==
- National Register of Historic Places listings in Platte County, Missouri
