= Edgerton Junction, Missouri =

Unincorporated community in Missouri, U.S.

Coordinates: 39°28′39″N 94°40′30″W

Edgerton Junction is an unincorporated community in Platte County, in the U.S. state of Missouri. It is within the Kansas City metropolitan area.

The community is on a hilltop overlooking the Platte River, which flows past one-half mile to the east. Edgerton is three miles to the northeast at the intersection of Missouri routes B and Z.

== History ==
The community was named for the fact it was a junction of the Chicago, Rock Island and Pacific Railway near Edgerton. A post office called Edgerton Junction was established in 1899, and remained in operation until 1916.
