= Kickapoo Township, Platte County, Missouri =

Township in Platte County, Missouri, U.S.

Kickapoo Township
- Township
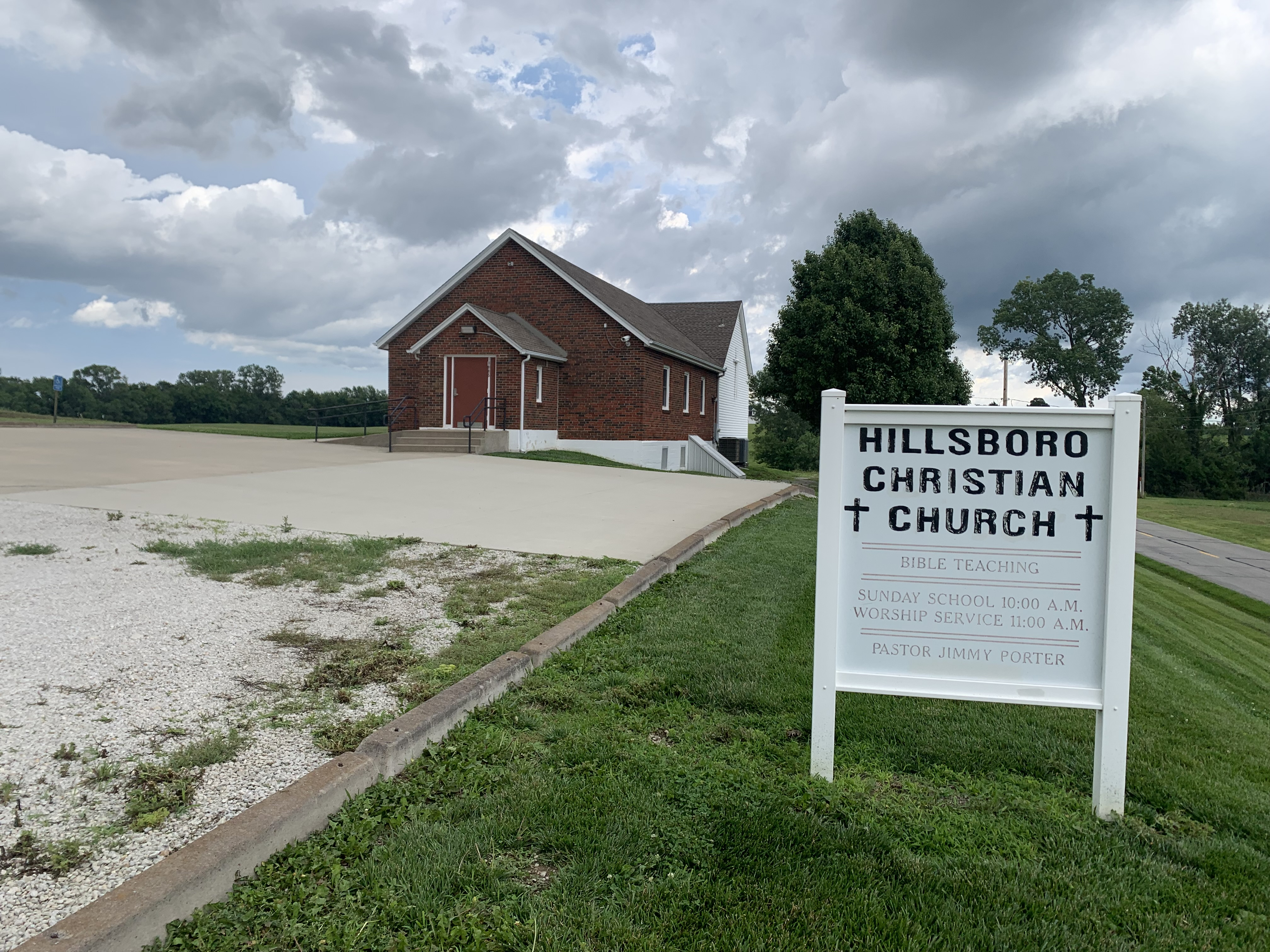
- Hillsboro Christian Church in central Kickapoo Township

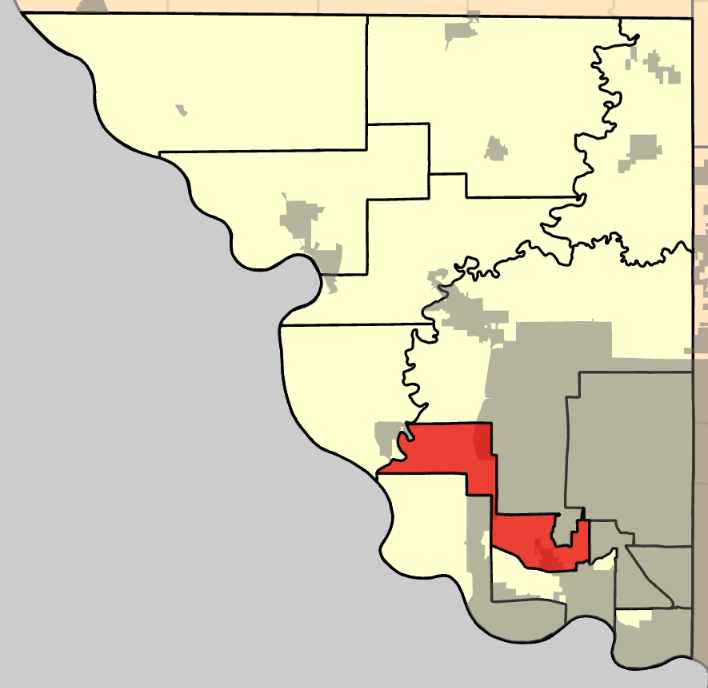
- Coordinates: 39°16′03″N 94°45′16″W
- Country: United States
- State: Missouri
- County: Platte

Area
  - Total: 15.37 sq mi (39.8 km^{2})
  - Land: 15.33 sq mi (39.7 km^{2})
  - Water: 0.04 sq mi (0.10 km^{2}) 0.26%
- Elevation: 902 ft (275 m)

Population (2020)
  - Total: 5,924
  - Density: 388.2/sq mi (149.9/km^{2})
- FIPS code: 29-16538513
- GNIS feature ID: 767200

Kickapoo Township is a township in Platte County, Missouri, United States. At the 2020 census, its population was 5,924.
