= Kerrville, Missouri =

Unincorporated community in Missouri, U.S.

Coordinates: 39°22′42″N 94°41′43″W

Kerrville is an unincorporated community in Platte County, in the U.S. state of Missouri. It is within the Kansas City metropolitan area.

Kerrville has the name of Ezra Kerr, the original owner of the land where the community is now located.
