= Pawnee Township, Platte County, Missouri =

Township in Platte County, Missouri, U.S.

Pawnee Township
- Township
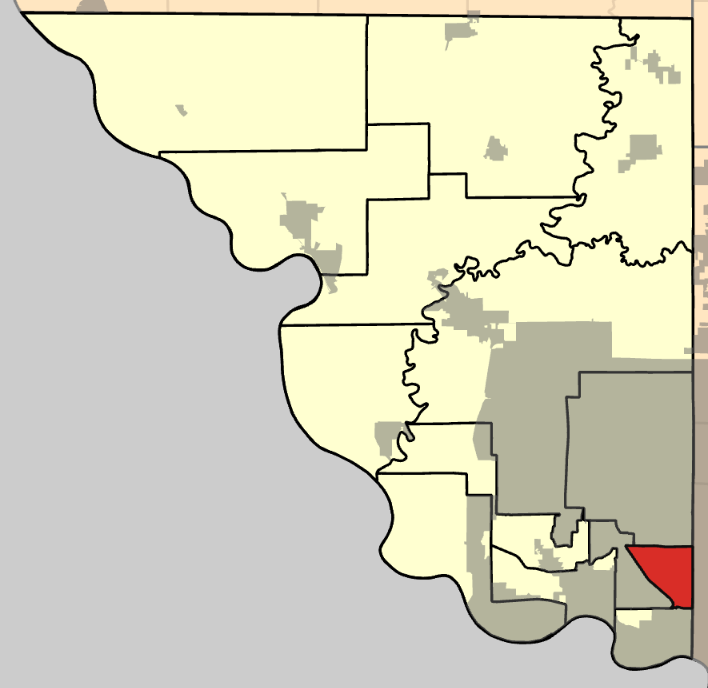
- Coordinates: 39°12′44″N 94°37′10″W
- Country: United States
- State: Missouri
- County: Platte

Area
  - Total: 4.32 sq mi (11.2 km^{2})
  - Land: 4.31 sq mi (11.2 km^{2})
  - Water: 0.01 sq mi (0.026 km^{2}) 0.23%
- Elevation: 902 ft (275 m)

Population (2020)
  - Total: 10,137
  - Density: 2,352/sq mi (908/km^{2})
- FIPS code: 29-16556598
- GNIS feature ID: 767204

Pawnee Township is a township in Platte County, Missouri, United States. At the 2020 census, its population was 10,137.

== Geography ==
The area of Pawnee Township is 11.18 square kilometers, of which 11.16 square kilometers are land and 0.02 square kilometers are water.
