= Hoover, Missouri =

Unincorporated community in Platte County, Missouri, United States

Coordinates: 39°22′08″N 94°40′01″W

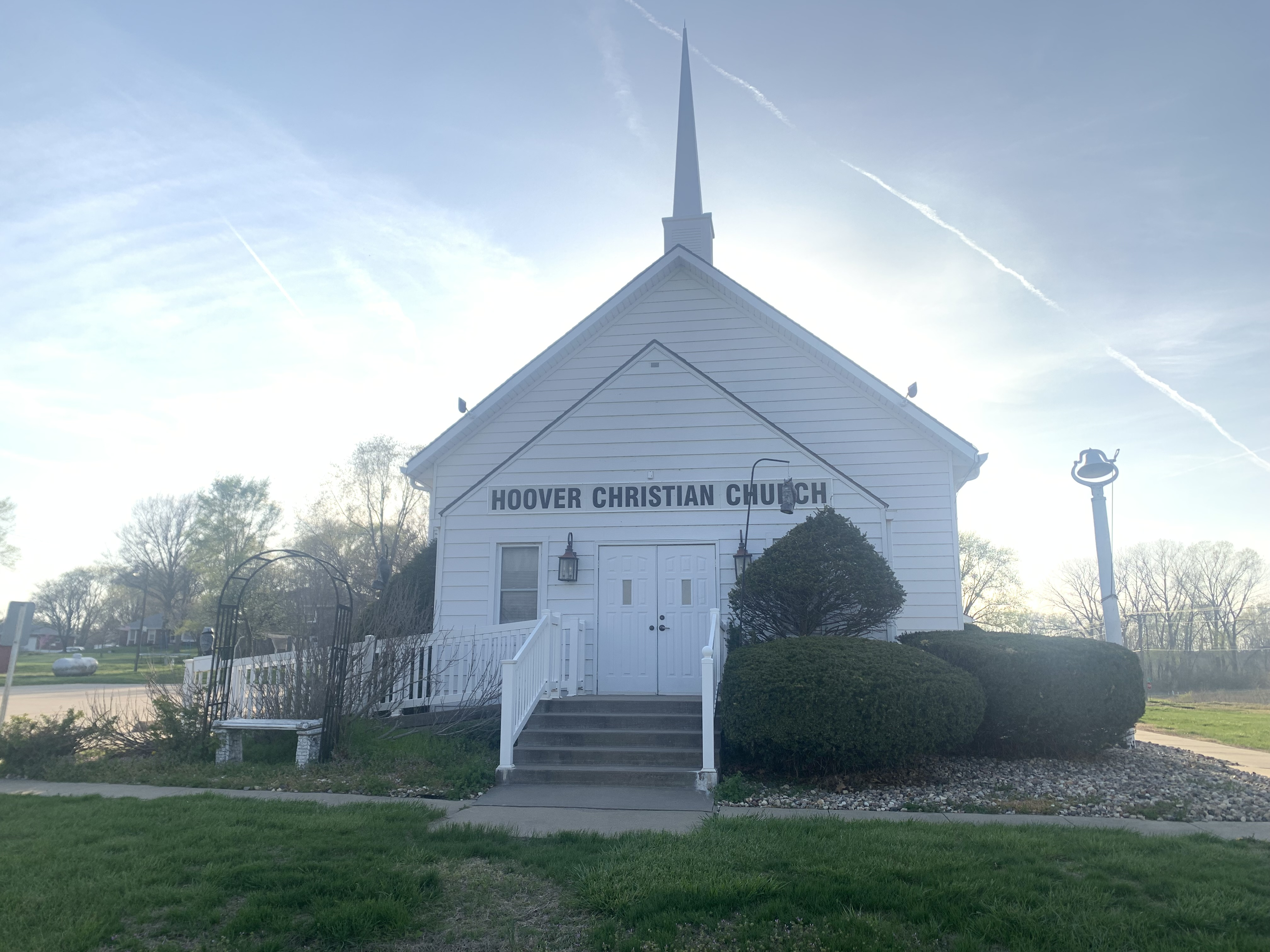
Hoover Christian Church, April 2025

Hoover is an unincorporated community in Platte County, Missouri, United States, that is within the Kansas City metropolitan area.

== History ==
A post office called Hoover was established in 1894, and remained in operation until 1899. The community has the name of James Hoover, a local merchant.
