= Platte County School District Number 3 =

School district in Missouri, U.S.

Platte County School District #3 is a public school district based in Platte City, Missouri, United States.

== Geography ==
Platte County School District #3 is based in Platte County. The school district encloses some of Kansas City International Airport.

The majority of the district is in Platte County, where it includes portions of Kansas City, as well as Ferrelview, Platte City, Tracy, and the Platte County portion of Smithville. The district extends into Clay County, where it includes more portions of Kansas City.

== Schools ==
The school district is split into two campuses. The original campus is the Platte City campus, within the town limits of Platte City. It includes the following schools.

- Great Beginnings, Preschool & Early Childhood
- Compass Elementary, Grades K-5
- Siegrist Elementary, Grades K-5
- Platte City Middle School, Grades 6–8
- Platte County High School, Grades 9–12
- Northland Career Center, Area Vocational-Technical School

The Barry Heights neighborhood in the south part of the county is the location of the Barry campus, which includes:

- Pathfinder Elementary, Grades K-4
- Barry School, Grades 5-8 + Early Childhood

== Student demographics ==
Up from 1,886 students in the 1996–1997 school year, the district currently serves 3,952 students in the 2015–2016 school year.

== See also ==
- List of school districts in Missouri
