= Preston Township, Platte County, Missouri =

Township in Platte County, Missouri, U.S.

Preston Township
- Township
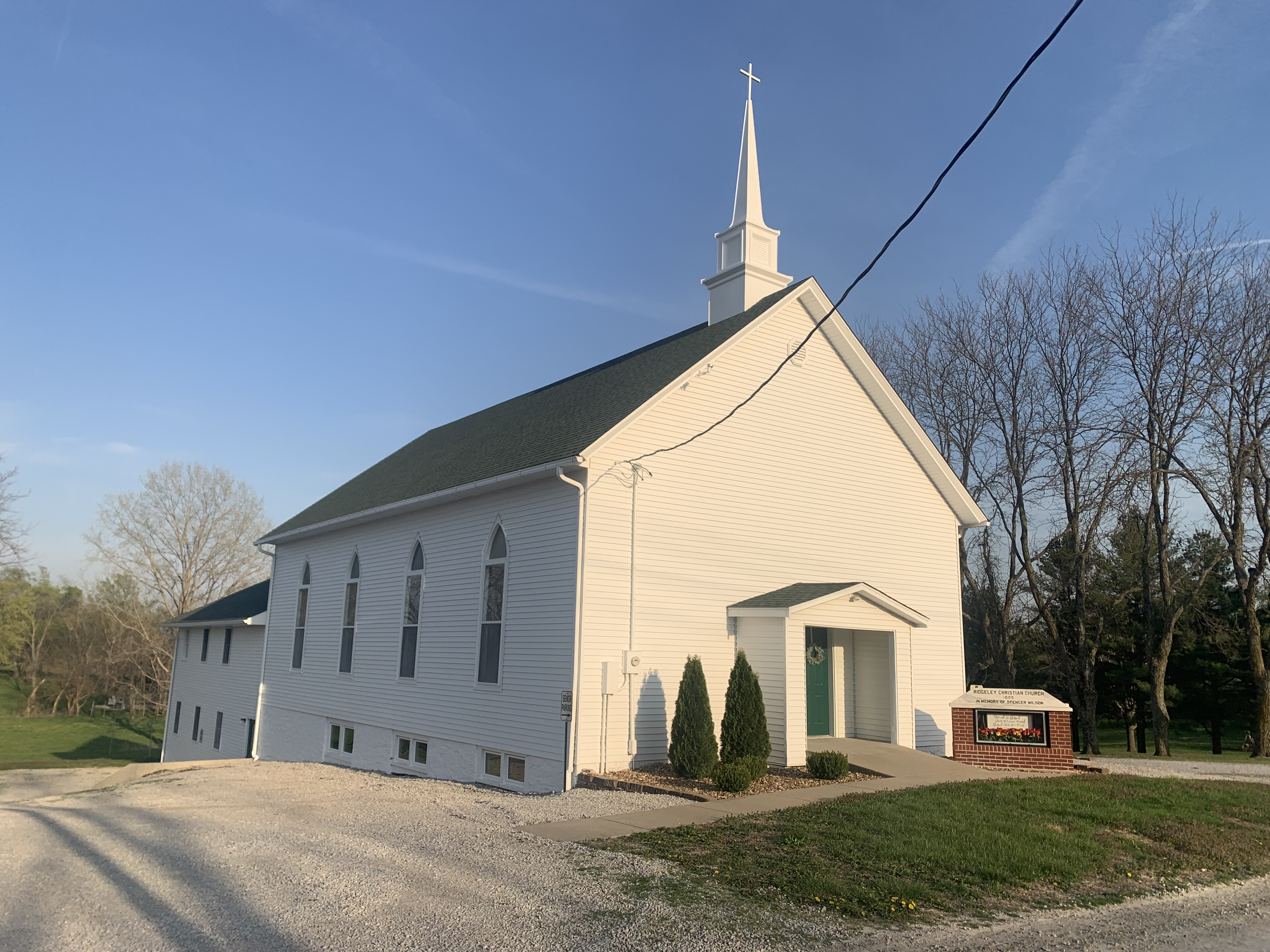
- Ridgely Christian Church in Ridgely, Missouri

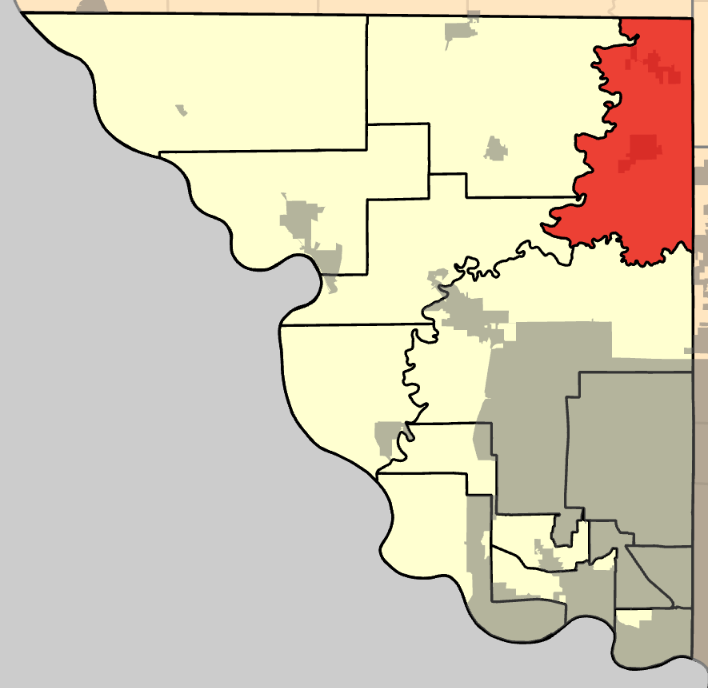
- Coordinates: 39°27′07″N 94°38′22″W
- Country: United States
- State: Missouri
- County: Platte

Area
  - Total: 37.7 sq mi (98 km^{2})
  - Land: 37.66 sq mi (97.5 km^{2})
  - Water: 0.04 sq mi (0.10 km^{2}) 0.11%
- Elevation: 965 ft (294 m)

Population (2020)
  - Total: 1,735
  - Density: 46.1/sq mi (17.8/km^{2})
- FIPS code: 29-16559924
- GNIS feature ID: 767206

Preston Township is a township in Platte County, Missouri, United States. At the 2020 census, its population was 1,735.

Preston Township was erected in 1838, taking its name from Preston Dunlap, a local judge.
