= Waldron, Missouri =

Unincorporated community in Missouri, U.S.

Coordinates: 39°13′20″N 94°47′36″W

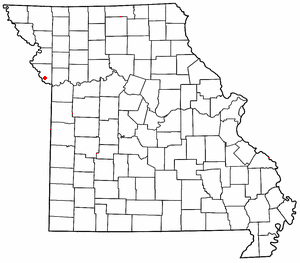

Waldron is an unincorporated community in southwestern Platte County, Missouri in the United States. Waldron is located on the edge of the Missouri River floodplain approximately one mile southeast of Route 45. I-435 crosses the Missouri River 2.5 miles south of the community. The Burlington Northern Railroad passes the community. It is within the Kansas City metropolitan area.

== History ==
Waldron was laid out in 1869 by J. M. and M. H. Waldron, and named for them. A post office called Waldron has been in operation since 1869.

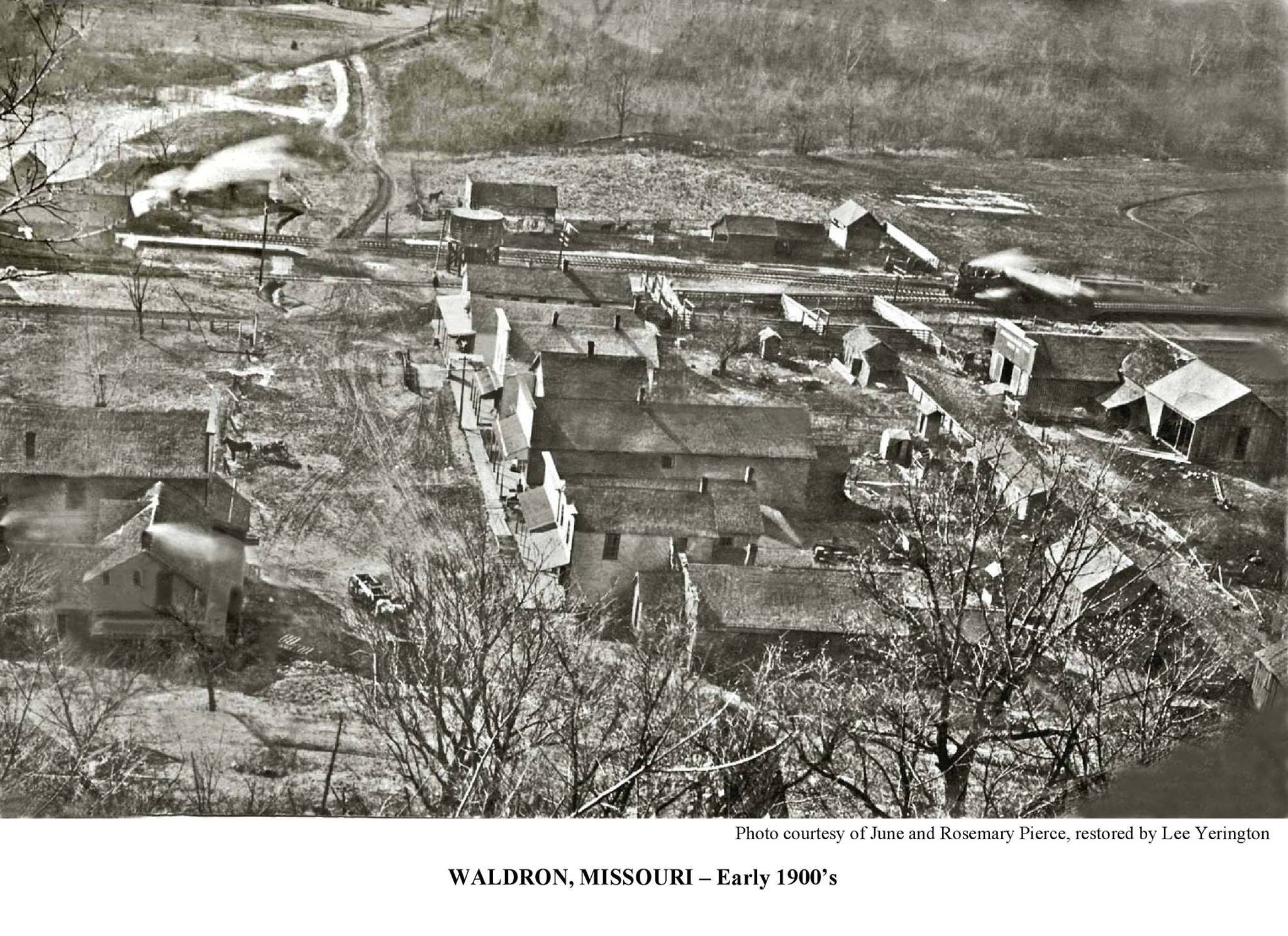
Historic Photo of Waldron early 1900s

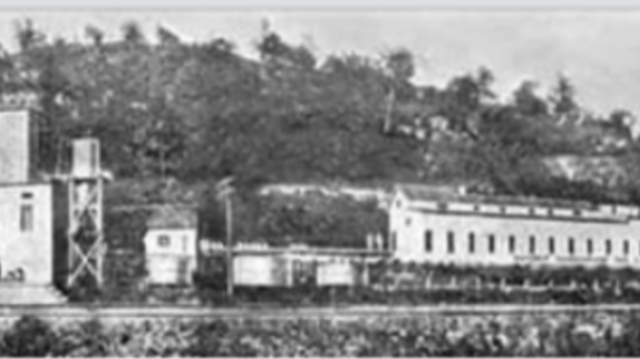
Original McCormick Distillery in Waldron before moving to Weston

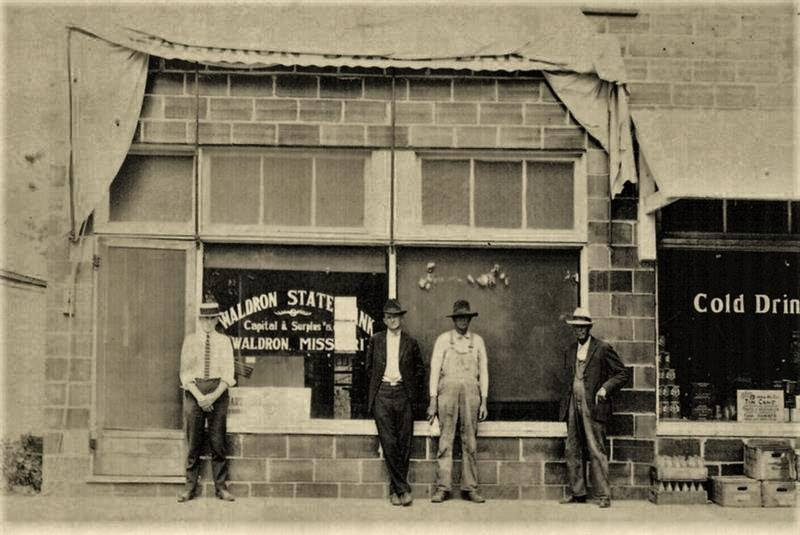
Waldron State Bank in Waldron before it burned in the early 1900s

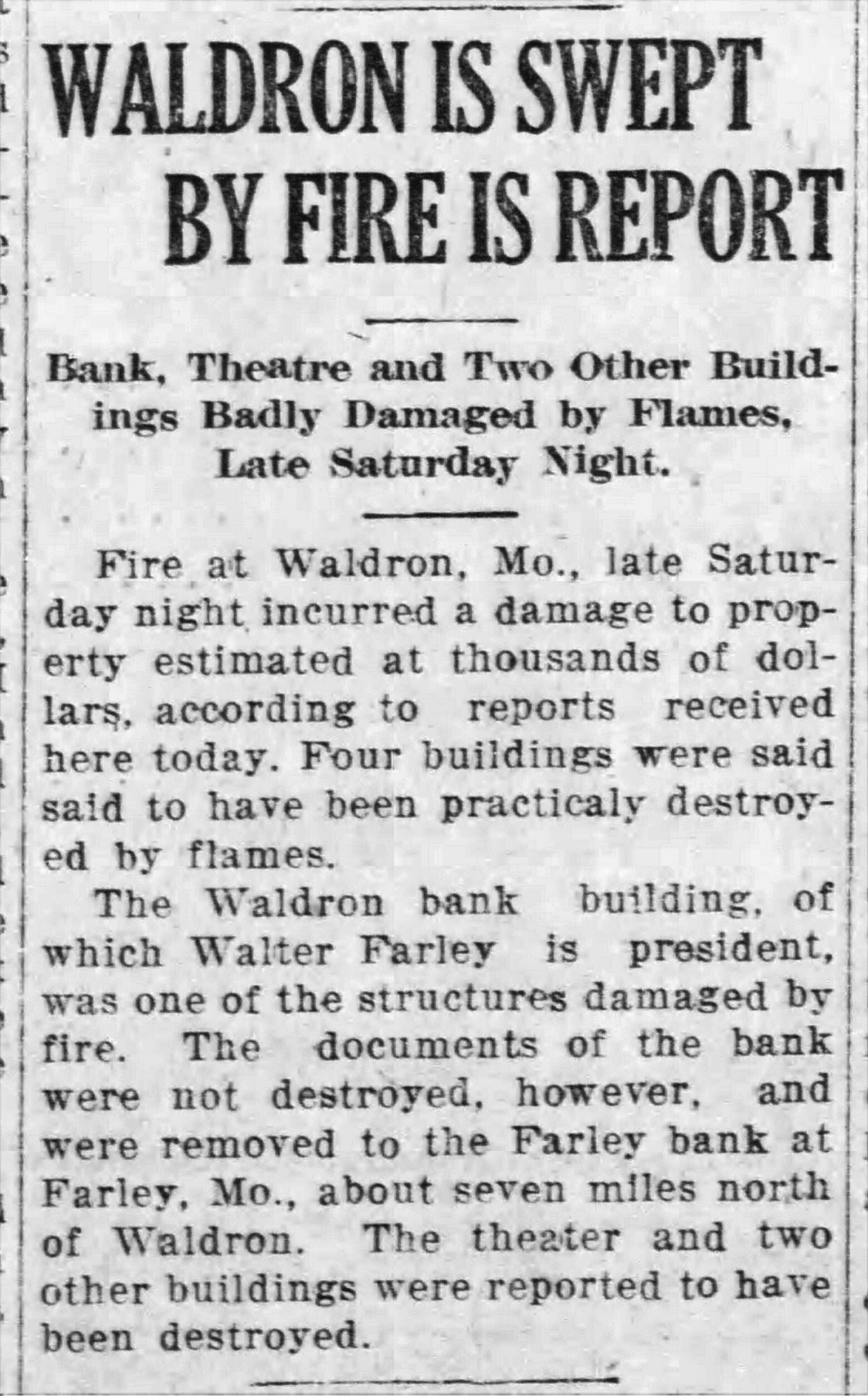
Waldron Fire

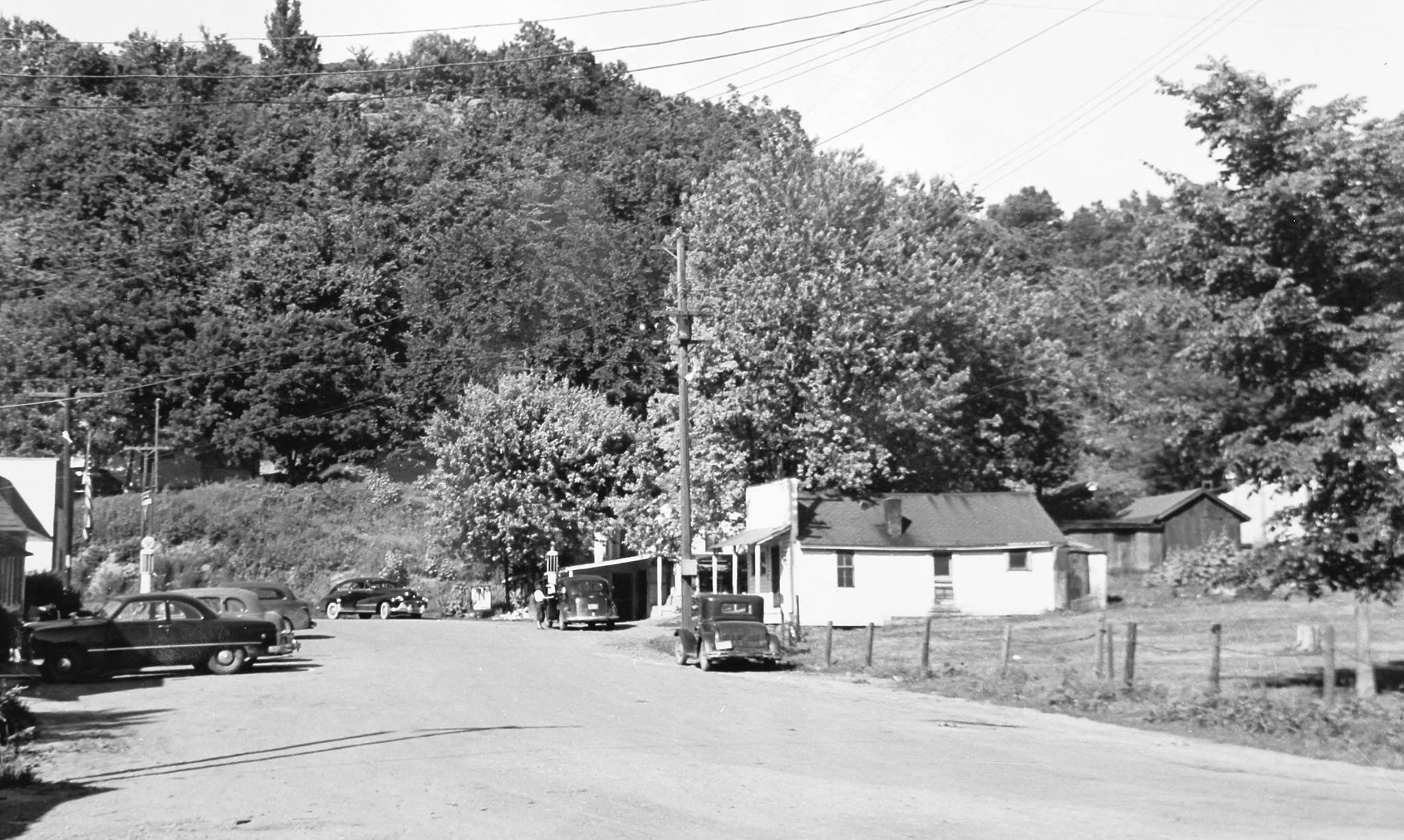
Waldron Main Street in the 1950s

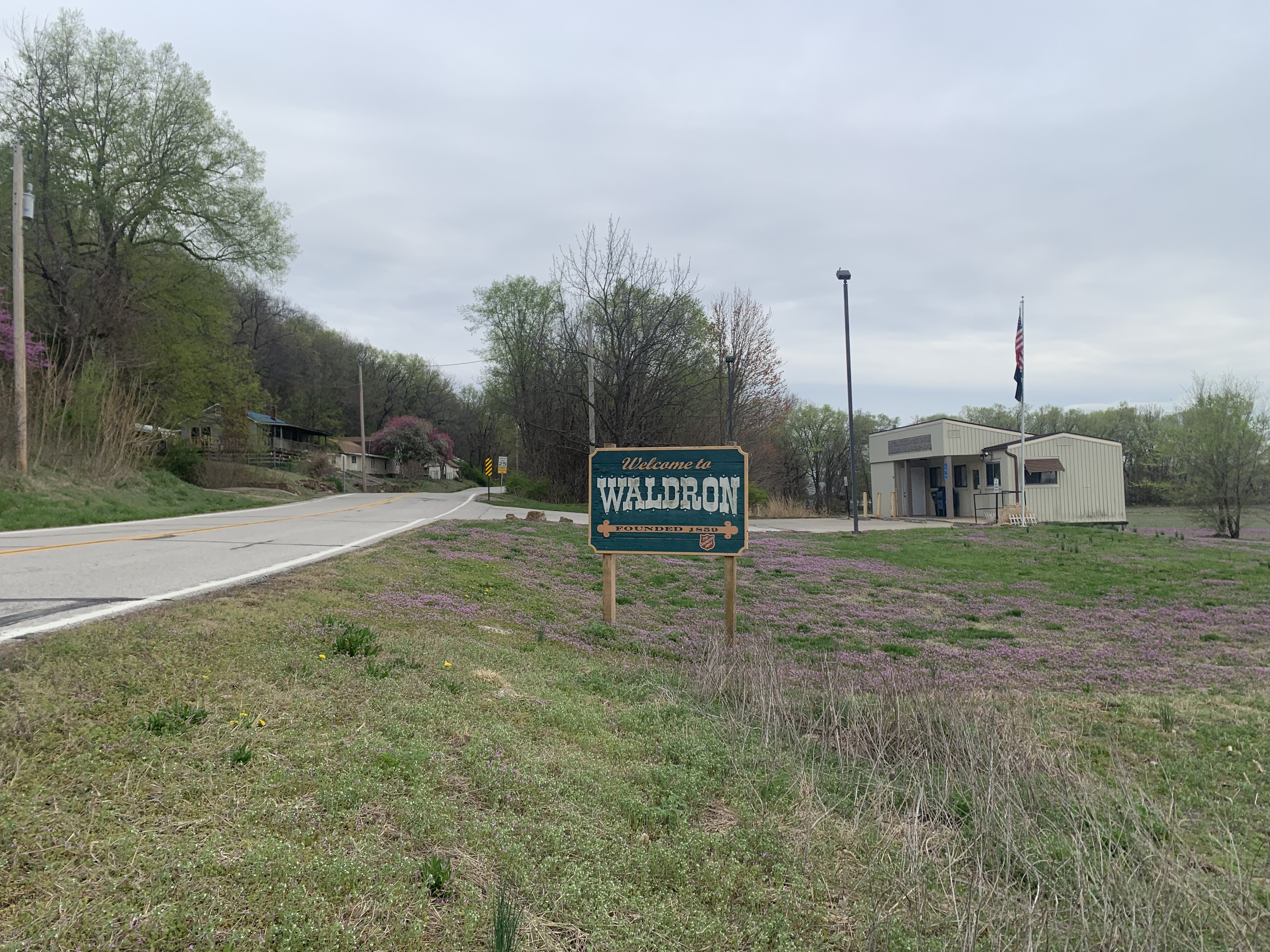
Waldron, Missouri from NW River Rd
