= Marshall Township, Platte County, Missouri =

Township in Platte County, Missouri, U.S.

Marshall Township
- Township
- Salem Christian Church in Marshall Township

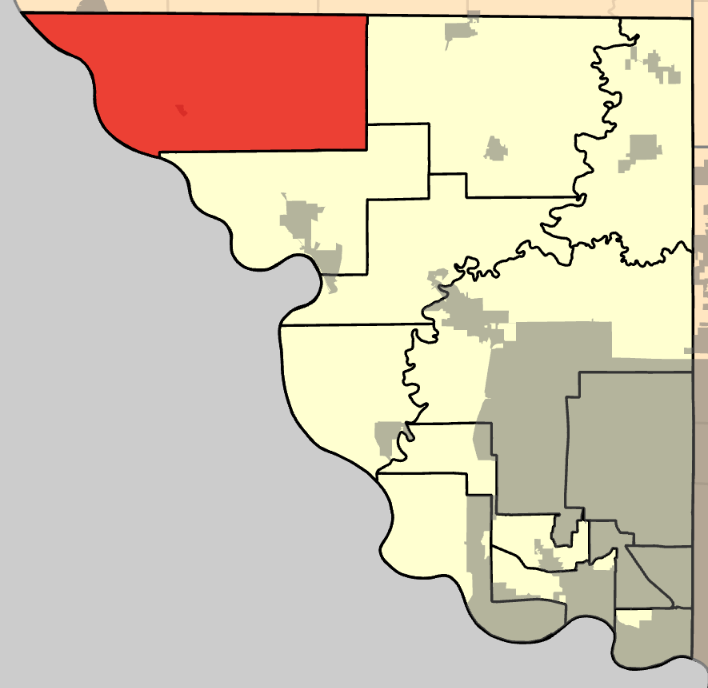
- Coordinates: 39°29′49″N 94°57′07″W
- Country: United States
- State: Missouri
- County: Platte

Area
  - Total: 62.37 sq mi (161.5 km^{2})
  - Land: 60.94 sq mi (157.8 km^{2})
  - Water: 1.43 sq mi (3.7 km^{2}) 2.29%
- Elevation: 945 ft (288 m)

Population (2020)
  - Total: 759
  - Density: 12.5/sq mi (4.8/km^{2})
- FIPS code: 29-16546298
- GNIS feature ID: 767202

Marshall Township is a township in Platte County, Missouri, United States. At the 2020 census, its population was 759.

Marshall Township was erected in 1839, and most likely has the name of Frederick Marshall, a local medical doctor.
