= Lee Township, Platte County, Missouri =

Township in Platte County, Missouri, U.S.

Lee Township
- Township
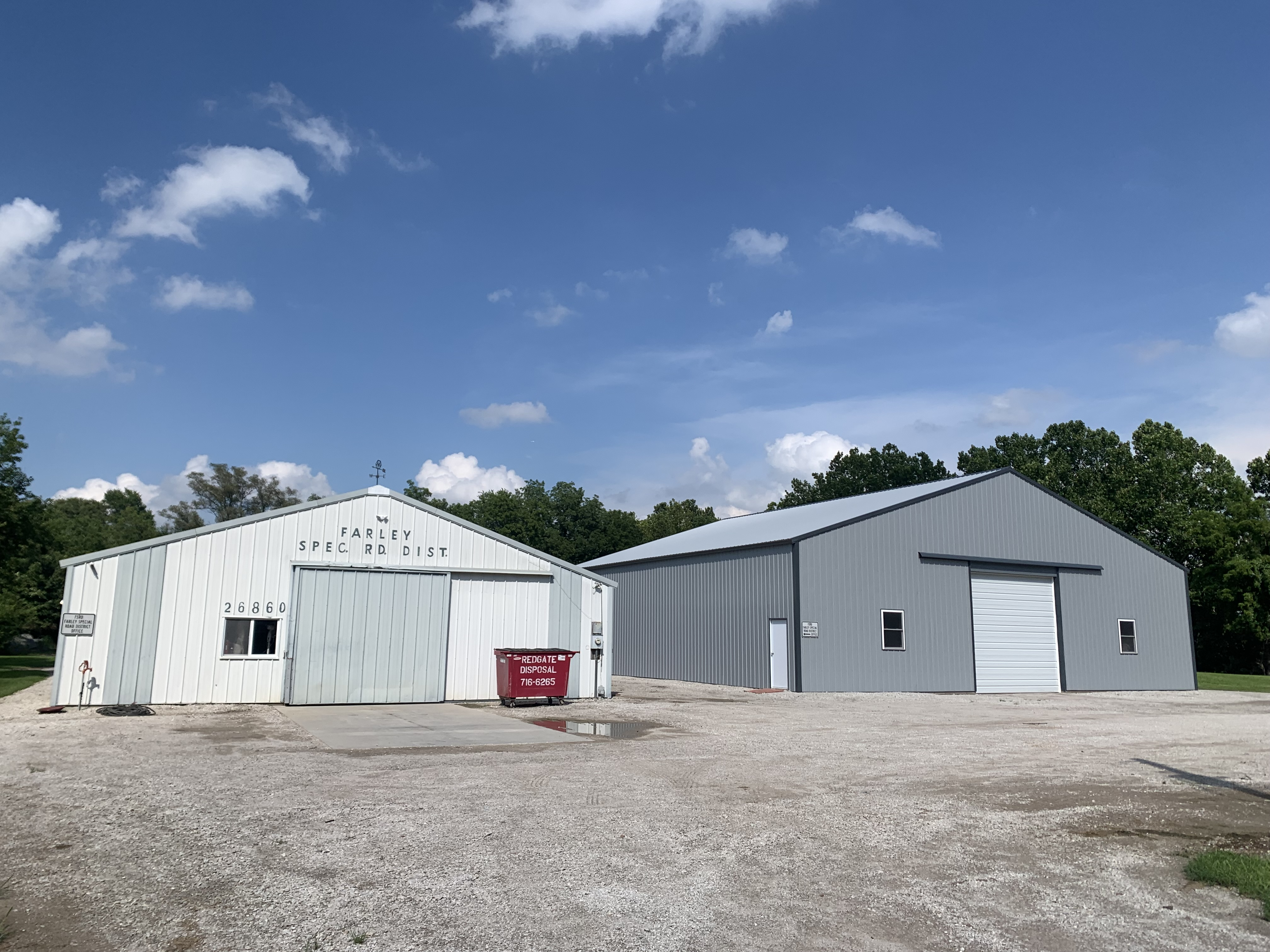
- Farley Special Road District building at Stillings, Missouri in Lee Township.

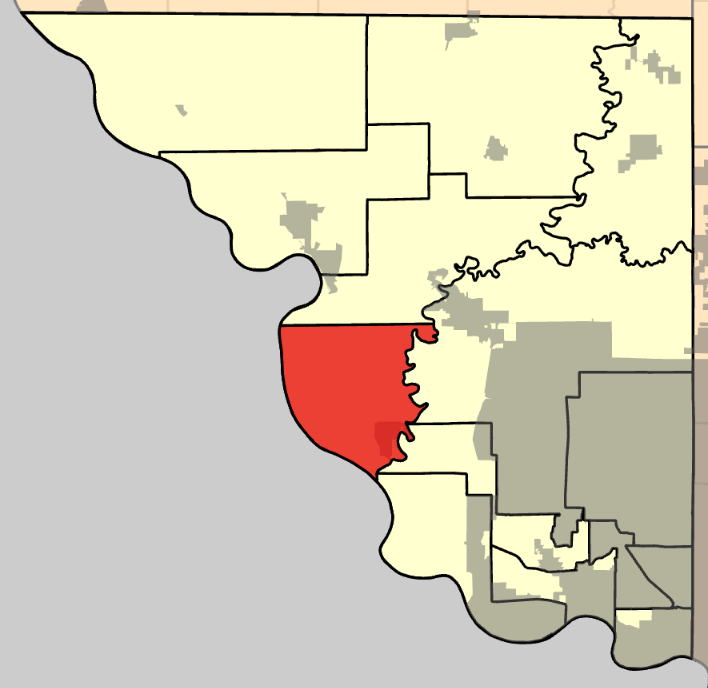
- Coordinates: 39°18′38″N 94°51′30″W
- Country: United States
- State: Missouri
- County: Platte

Area
  - Total: 26.42 sq mi (68.4 km^{2})
  - Land: 25.33 sq mi (65.6 km^{2})
  - Water: 1.09 sq mi (2.8 km^{2}) 4.13%
- Elevation: 764 ft (233 m)

Population (2020)
  - Total: 679
  - Density: 26.8/sq mi (10.3/km^{2})
- FIPS code: 29-16541240
- GNIS feature ID: 767201

Lee Township is a township in Platte County, Missouri, United States. At the 2020 census, its population was 679.

Lee Township was erected in 1839 and was named after General Robert E. Lee.
