= May Township, Platte County, Missouri =

Township in Platte County, Missouri, U.S.

May Township
- Township
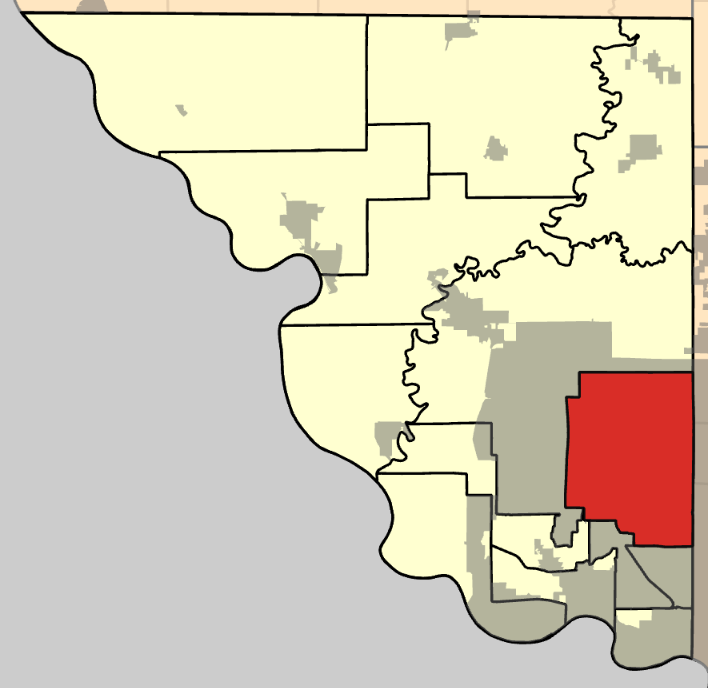
- Coordinates: 39°16′41″N 94°38′57″W
- Country: United States
- State: Missouri
- County: Platte

Area
  - Total: 32.0 sq mi (83 km^{2})
  - Land: 31.79 sq mi (82.3 km^{2})
  - Water: 0.21 sq mi (0.54 km^{2}) 0.66%
- Elevation: 981 ft (299 m)

Population (2020)
  - Total: 29,847
  - Density: 939.2/sq mi (362.6/km^{2})
- FIPS code: 29-16546874
- GNIS feature ID: 767203

May Township is a township in Platte County, Missouri, United States. At the 2020 census, its population was 29,847.

May Township has the name of B. L. May, a local medical doctor.
