= Fox Township, Platte County, Missouri =

Township in Platte County, Missouri, U.S.

Fox Township
- Township
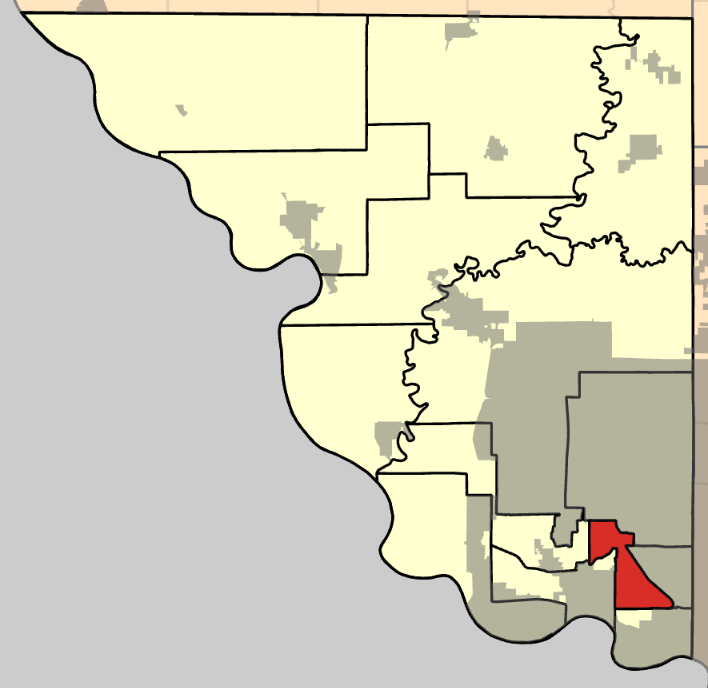
- Coordinates: 39°12′46″N 94°39′05″W
- Country: United States
- State: Missouri
- County: Platte

Area
  - Total: 5.33 sq mi (13.8 km^{2})
  - Land: 5.3 sq mi (14 km^{2})
  - Water: 0.03 sq mi (0.078 km^{2}) 0.56%
- Elevation: 938 ft (286 m)

Population (2020)
  - Total: 13,921
  - Density: 2,610/sq mi (1,010/km^{2})
- FIPS code: 29-16525450
- GNIS feature ID: 767198

Fox Township is a township in Platte County, Missouri, United States. At the 2020 census, its population was 13,921.
