= Missouri Route 273 =

State highway in Missouri, U.S.

Route 273
- MO 273 highlighted in red

Route information
- Maintained by MoDOT
- Length: 23.728 mi (38.187 km)

Major junctions
- South end: I-29 / US 71 / Route 371 near Tracy
- North end: US 59 at the Kansas state line in Atchison, KS

Location
- Country: United States
- State: Missouri

Highway system
- Missouri State Highway System; Interstate; US; State; Supplemental
← I-270	→ US 275

Route 273 is a highway in northwestern Missouri. Its northern terminus is at the Kansas state line halfway across the Missouri River near Atchison, Kansas. At this point it is concurrent with U.S. Route 59. The southern terminus is at I-29/US 71 near Tracy. All but the southeasternmost six miles (10 km) overlap Route 45. The road runs through Platte and Buchanan Counties.

== Route Description ==
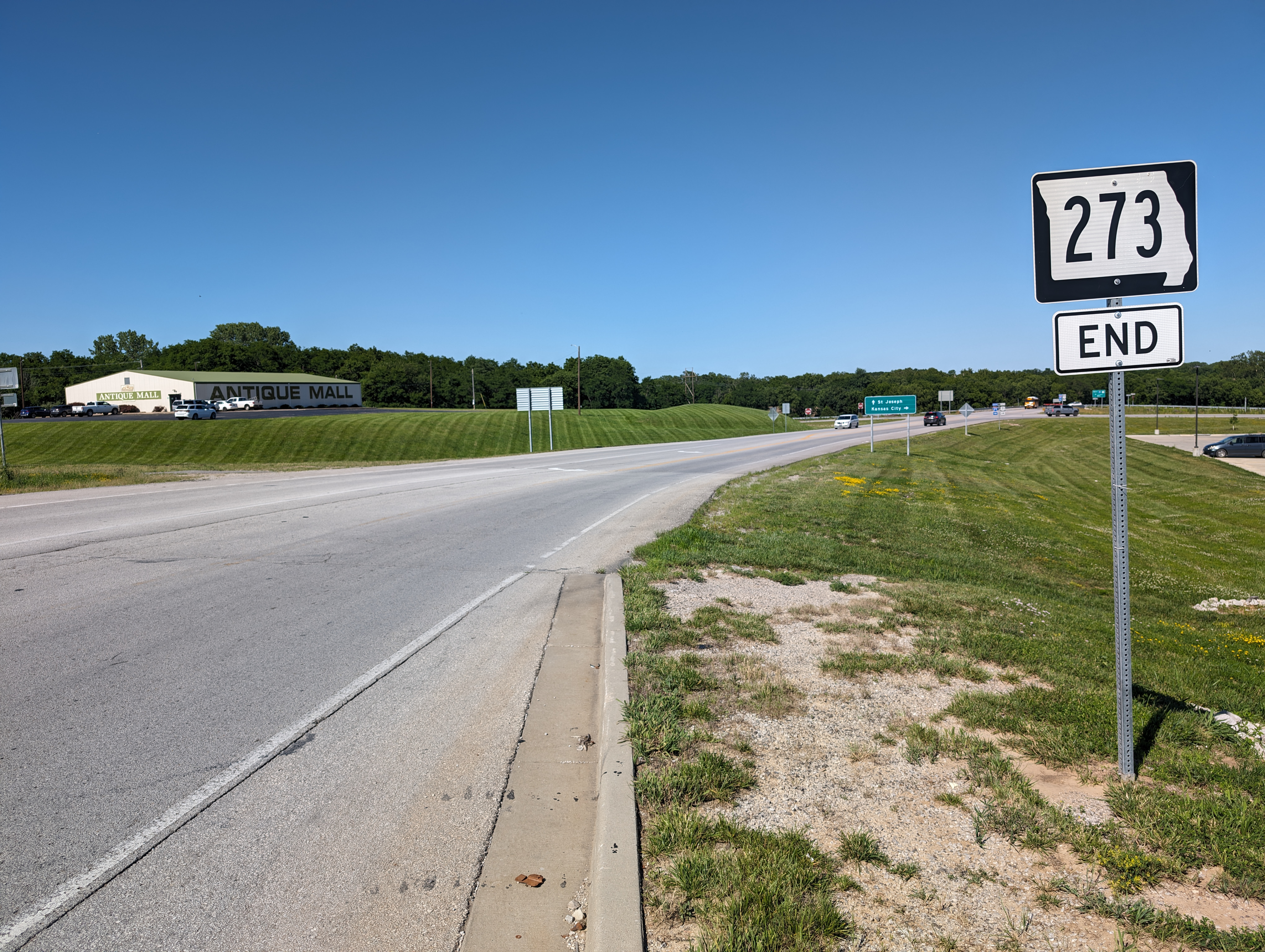
the southern terminus of Missouri 273

Route 273 begins with a brief concurrency with Route 371 as it travels southwest from Exit 20 of I-29 in Platte County. It then enters Tracy and turns northwest, a course it will traverse the vast majority of the route, and travels 4 miles to its junction with Route 45 southeast of Weston. Continuing concurrent with Route 45, it heads northwest through Weston, and descends into the Missouri River Valley where it will remain for the rest of its course. It passes Snow Creek Ski Resort and Iatan as it hugs the river bluffs and travels concurrent to the BNSF railroad. Two prominent oxbow lakes are visible to the west: Bean Lake and Lewis and Clark Lake as it continues the 6 miles to its junction with US-59. It then enters Buchanan County where the communities of Lewis and Clark Village, Lewis and Clark State Park, and Lewis and Clark Lake (Sugar Lake) are just southwest of this junction. After heading 3 miles west with US-59, the route travels towards Atchison and passes through Winthrop before crossing the Missouri River on the Amelia Earhart Bridge.

== Major intersections ==
County	Location	mi	km	Destinations	Notes
Platte	Fair Township	0.000	0.000	I-29 / US 71 – St. Joseph, Kansas City Route 371 begins	Southern end of Route 371 overlap; exit 20
Platte	Fair Township	0.231	0.372	Route 371 north – Tracy	Northern end of Route 371 overlap
Platte	Tracy	0.732	1.178	To Route 92 (Route 92 Spur)	
Platte	Weston Township	4.679	7.530	Route 45 south / Route JJ west – Beverly, Weston, Weston Bend State Park	Southern end of Route 45 overlap
Platte	Weston	6.782	10.915	Route P north	
Platte	Weston	7.414	11.932	Route H north	
Buchanan	Rush Township	19.046	30.652	Route 138 west – Lewis and Clark Village, Lewis and Clark State Park	
Buchanan	Rush Township	20.096	32.341	US 59 north – St. Joseph Route 45 ends	Southern end of US 59 overlap; northern end of Route 45 overlap
Missouri River		23.455– 23.728	37.747– 38.187	Amelia Earhart Memorial Bridge; Missouri–Kansas state line; Route 273 ends	
Missouri River		23.455– 23.728	37.747– 38.187	US-59 south – Atchison	Continuation into Kansas
1.000 mi = 1.609 km; 1.000 km = 0.621 mi: Concurrency terminus
