= 2011 Missouri River flood =

2011 flood affecting multiple states in USA

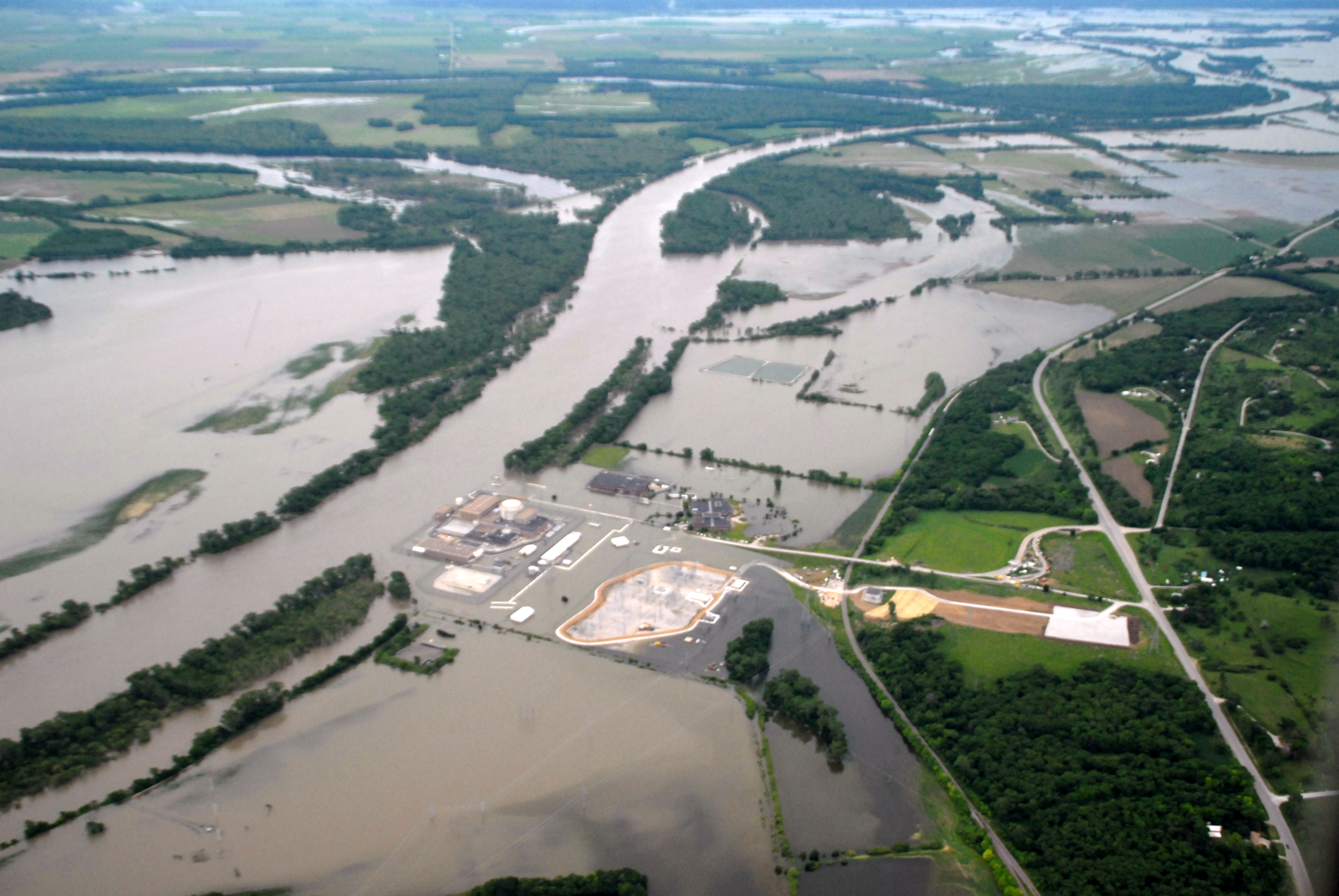
Corps of Engineers photo of June 16, 2011, showing the Fort Calhoun nuclear power plant surrounded by flood water

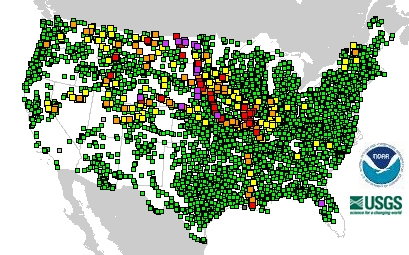
NOAA map of flooding areas on June 18, 2011. The Missouri River is reflected by gages in the middle and top. Purple reflects heavy flooding and orange moderate flooding.

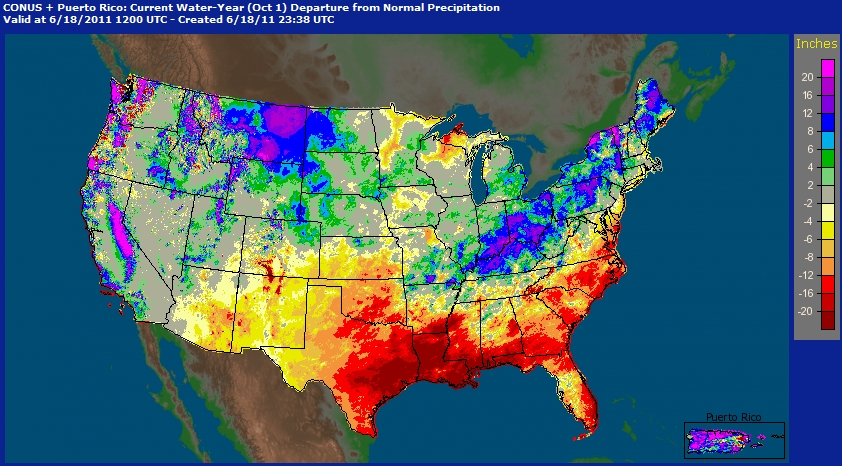
U.S. Weather Service map showing number of precipitation inches above/below year to date at June 18, 2011. The map shows that year to date precipitation in the Missouri headwaters basin of Montana had precipitation of 20 inches or more above normal while the rest of the basin precipitation was near normal. Above normal precipitation along the Ohio River led to the 2011 Mississippi River flood earlier in the year. Significantly lower than normal rain in eastern Arizona led to the Wallow Fire.

The 2011 flooding event on the Missouri River in the United States was triggered by record snowfall in Rocky Mountains of Montana and Wyoming along with near-record spring rainfall in central and eastern Montana. All six major dams along the Missouri River released record amounts of water to prevent overflow which led to flooding threatening several towns and cities along the river from Montana to Missouri; in particular Bismarck, North Dakota; Pierre, South Dakota; Dakota Dunes, South Dakota; South Sioux City, Nebraska, Sioux City, Iowa; Omaha, Nebraska; Council Bluffs, Iowa; Saint Joseph, Missouri; Kansas City, Missouri; Jefferson City, Missouri, and St. Louis, Missouri. Many smaller towns were also at risk, suffering the same fate as the larger cities if not worse. According to the National Weather Service, in the second half of the month of May 2011, almost a year's worth of rain fell over the upper Missouri River basin. Extremely heavy rainfall in conjunction with an estimated 212 percent of normal snowpack in the Rocky Mountains contributed to this flooding event.

== Background ==
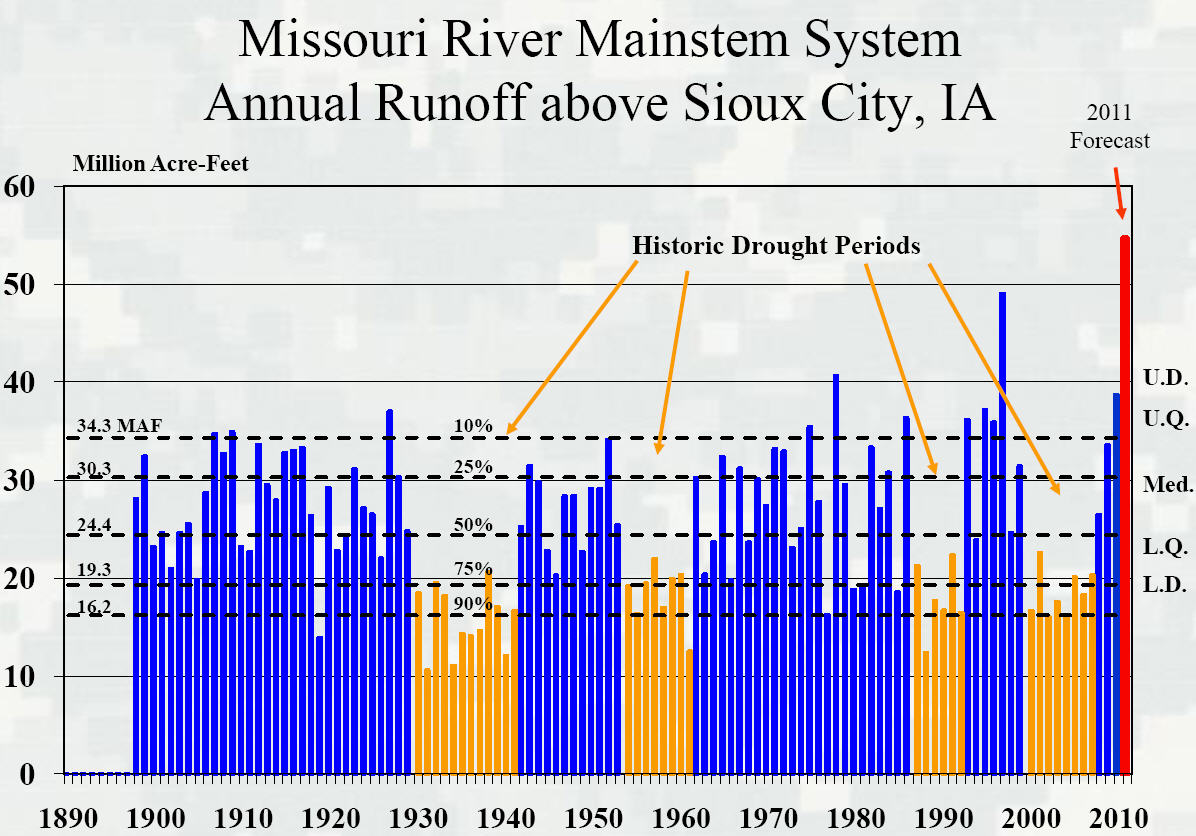
U.S. Army Corps of Engineers Report on June 18, 2011, predicting that 54,600,000 acre-feet (67.3 km^{3}) of run off would occur above Sioux City in 2011 -- the most in the history of record keeping on the river. It tops the record flow of 49,000,000 acre-feet (60 km^{3}) in 1997.

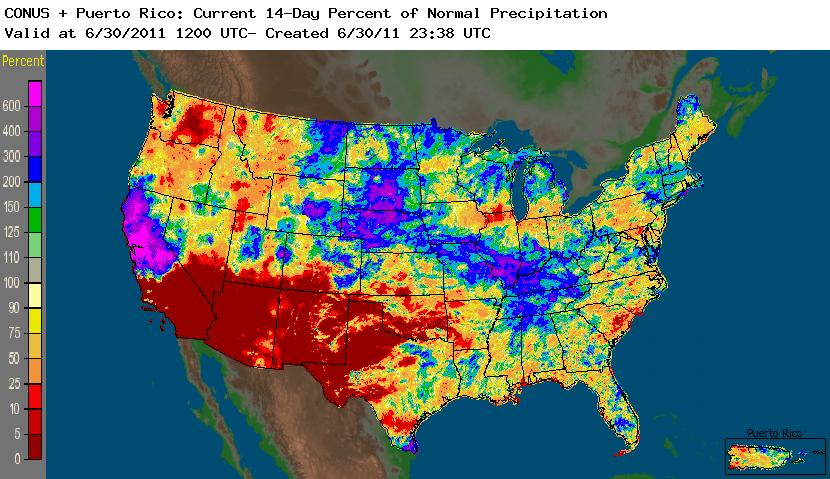
The flood in the last two weeks of June was made more intense by rains 600 percent or more above normal in the Missouri River basin below the Gavins Point Dam.

The flood, rather than being a short term event, was anticipated to last from June through August 2011 as a result of attempts by the Corps of Engineers to regulate the release of water through 850 miles (1,370 km) of open river from Garrison Dam in North Dakota to the confluence with the Mississippi River at St. Louis. The Garrison Dam began releasing a record of 152,000 cubic feet (4,300 m^{3}) of water per second on June 1, 2011—more than twice the previous record release in 1997. The Corps was criticized for not releasing the water earlier. However the Corps defended its practice noting that it did not foresee a cooler than normal spring which delayed the mountain snowmelt and the record sustained torrential spring rains in Wyoming and Montana.

In attempting to control the flood water release in since all the reservoirs were 100 percent or more of capacity (with the exception of the Fort Randall Dam), the Corps of Engineers doubled the record release of water in the river's five North and South Dakota dams. Officials said that problems downstream could have been alleviated by river control work and new levee construction that came about in the wake of the Great Flood of 1993. However, they were unsure whether the levees could sustain being waterlogged in a long-term flood.

A study by Utah State University examined the buildup of water storage leading to the 2011 Missouri River flooding observed by GRACE satellites indicated that precipitation over the MRB undergoes a profound modulation during the transition points of the Pacific quasi-decadal oscillation and associated teleconnections. The results suggest a prominent teleconnection forcing the wet/dry spells in the MRB, and this connection implies persistent dry conditions for the next 2 to 3 years, linked to the 2012–2013 Midwestern drought.

== Release of water by dam ==
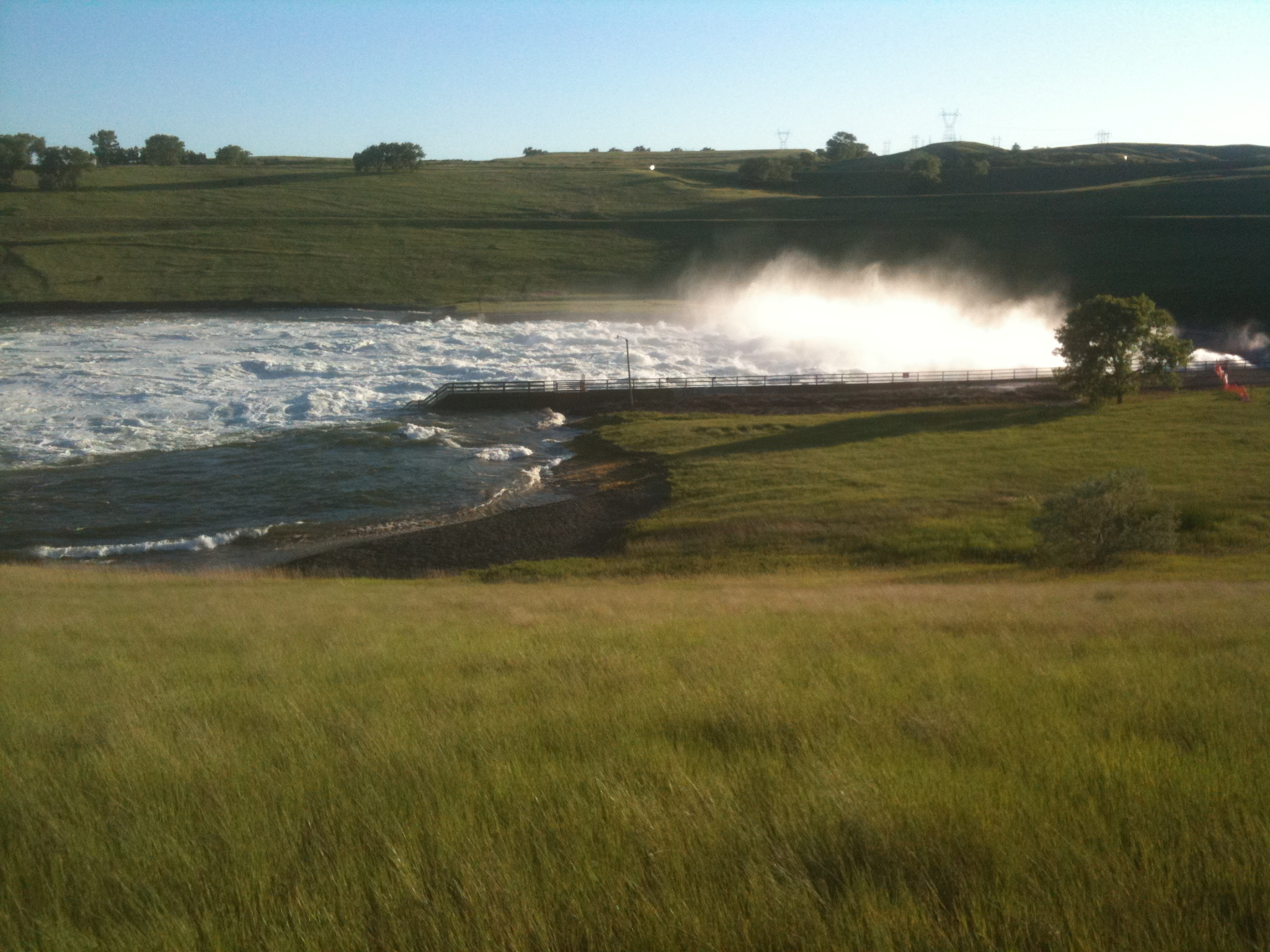
Oahe Dam release gates discharging floodwater at 150,000 cu ft/s (4,200 m^{3}/s) on June 15, 2011.

In May 2011, dams above Gavins Point began stepping up the release of water (in cubic feet/second), exceeding all previous nationwide records for release.

Dam	Previous record flow	Previous record year	Flow May 1, 2011	Flow May 31, 2011	Flow June/July 2011
Fort Peck Dam	35,000	1975	7,000	9,700	65,500 (June 19)
Garrison Dam	65,000	1975	17,400	80,400	150,200
Oahe Dam	59,000	1997	29,400	86,300	160,300
Big Bend Dam	74,000	1997	21,200	83,900	165,000 (planned)
Fort Randall Dam	67,000	1997	42,300	76,600	157,000 (planned)
Gavins Point Dam	70,000	1997	45,000	77,000	160,700

== Missouri River bridge closings ==
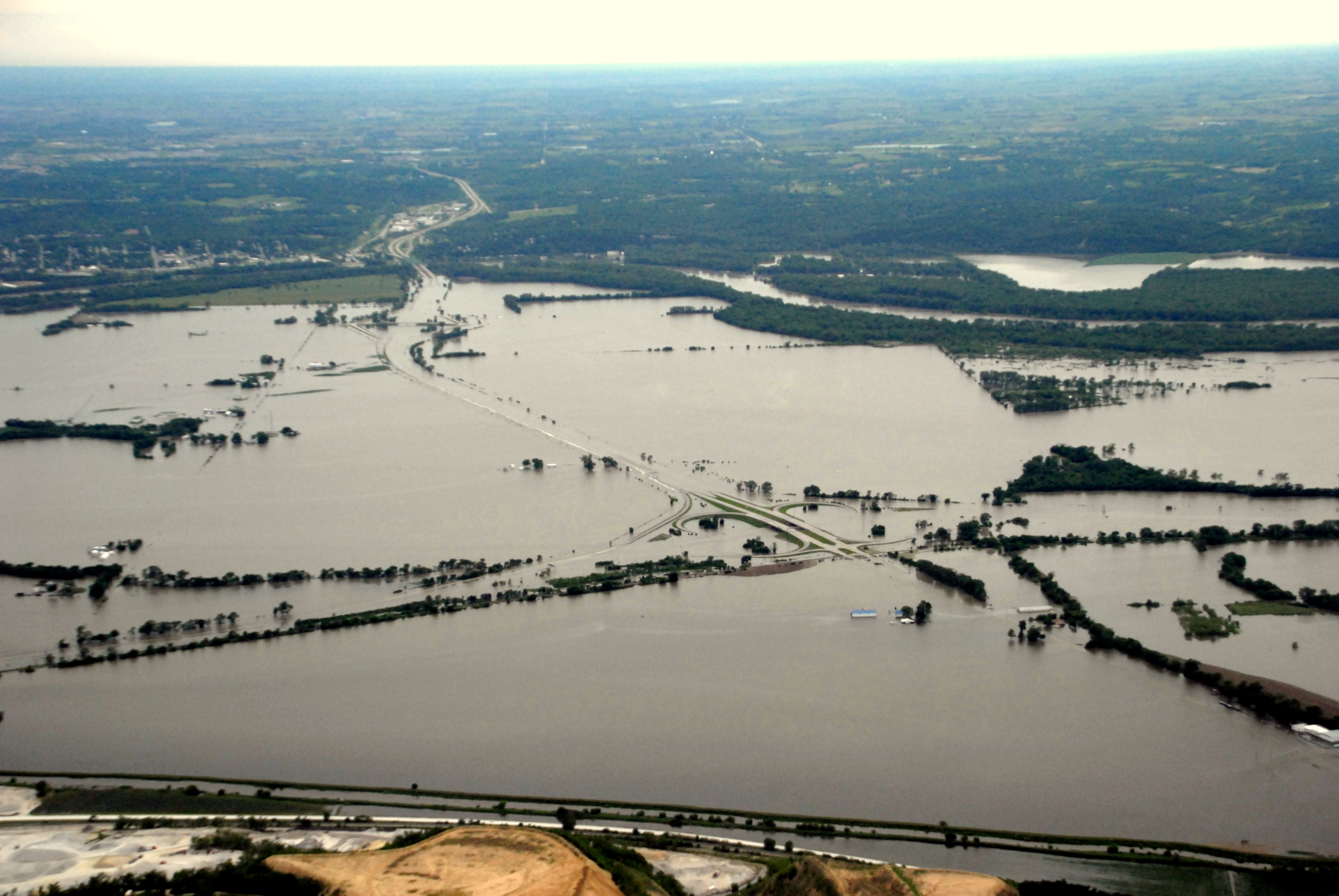
Interchange of I-29 and I-680 north of Council Bluffs, Iowa, looking towards the Mormon Bridge on June 16

The flood forced the closing of several Missouri River traffic bridges from just above Gavins Point to northern Missouri. The closings made it impossible to cross the river for more than 100 miles (160 km) between Sioux City and Omaha and another 100 miles (160 km) between Plattsmouth, Nebraska (just south of Omaha) at Mile Marker 591 and St. Joseph, Missouri, at Mile Marker 450. Authorities were also considering closing the Plattsmouth Bridge.

During the flood, every bridge between Omaha and Kansas City was either closed entirely, had exit ramps blocked or had other work at some point.

=== Long term closings ===
- Chief Standing Bear Memorial Bridge between Nebraska and South Dakota near Niobrara, Nebraska. The bridge actually remained open but flooding on the Nebraska side made it a dead end. However, some people (particularly employees at the Mike Durfee State Prison) used motor boats, kayaks, chest waders, and a homemade “swamp bike” to commute between the bridge and their cars outside the flood area.
- Burt County Missouri River Bridge (Mile 691) between Nebraska and Iowa near Decatur, Nebraska
- Mormon Bridge (Mile 622) between Nebraska and Iowa north of Omaha, Nebraska (Interstate 680)
- Bob Kerrey Pedestrian Bridge (Mile 616) – the pedestrian bridge between downtown Omaha and Council Bluffs which had been a popular viewing spot of the flood but was closed temporarily on June 30 while river debris was cleared from its base. The Council Bluffs side was closed on July 2 due to flooding on that side. It reopened September 3.
- Nebraska City Bridge (Mile 561) between Nebraska and Iowa (near Nebraska City, Nebraska)
- Brownville Bridge (Mile 535) between Nebraska and Missouri at Brownville, Nebraska
- Rulo Bridge (Mile 497) between Nebraska and Missouri at Rulo, Nebraska
- Amelia Earhart Bridge (Mile 422) between Kansas and Missouri at Atchison, Kansas. The bridge was open between Atchison and the small unincorporated community of Winthrop, Missouri, immediately across the bridge; however, access to Kansas City or St. Joseph on the Missouri side via U.S. Highway 59 was closed. Residents of Winthrop were evacuated on June 27.

=== Short-term closings/interruptions ===
- Blair Bridge (U.S. Route 30) (Mile 648) — The bridge closed from June 27-July 1 while flood barriers were erected in Iowa. It was also closed again July 6–7 for further shoring up work.
- Bellevue Bridge (Mile 602) – The bridge was closed June 27-July 2 due to flooding and sandbagging of Iowa Highway 370. Flooding in Haworth Park at the base of the bridge in Bellevue, Nebraska, had water up to the top of its basketball hoops on July 2.
- Pony Express Bridge (Mile 448) – Southbound exit in Elwood, Kansas, was closed temporarily on June 28 while storm water could be pumped off
- Centennial Bridge (Leavenworth, Kansas) (Mile 396)- Scheduled resurfacing work on the bridge had started in May prior to the flood, and traffic had been reduced to one lane. Since it was one of the few bridges open for traffic between Omaha and Kansas City, work on the bridge was halted indefinitely on July 1

== Flood stages and effects by state ==
=== Montana ===
On May 22, 2011, flooding of the Little Bighorn River and nearby tributaries inundated Crow Agency and shut down Interstate 90 between Hardin and the Wyoming state line. May 26 flooding on Musselshell River inundated portions of Roundup. Waters from the Shields River entering the Yellowstone River created flooding that closed a portion of Interstate 90 from Livingston to Springdale. Flooding on Pryor Creek, another tributary of the Yellowstone River prompted closing of Pompeys Pillar National Monument.

=== North Dakota ===
On May 10 President Barack Obama declared much of North Dakota a disaster area over flooding which began on February 14 and had been continuing.

Some of the most dramatic flooding in North Dakota was on Souris River which comes close to the Missouri but is not a tributary as it flows instead north into the Assiniboine River in Canada, which also experienced prior flooding. 10,000 people in Minot were evacuated on June 1. On June 20 after they returned, officials announced that a new crest from new heavy rains would result in the river being a foot higher than the first crest. On June 21, 12,000 people, a quarter of the town's population, were ordered to evacuate after Lake Darling Dam had to step up its release of water. Amtrak suspended service on the Empire Builder through Minnesota, North Dakota and eastern Montana.

=== South Dakota ===
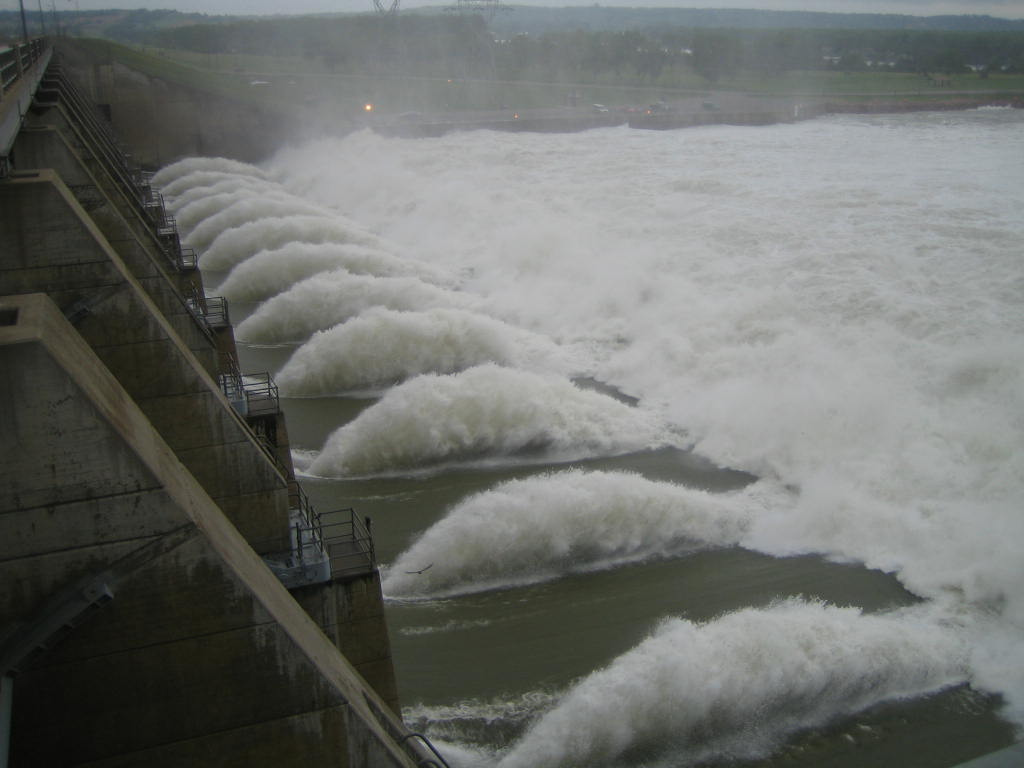
Gavins Point Dam releasing record 150,000 cubic feet/second of water on June 14, 2011.

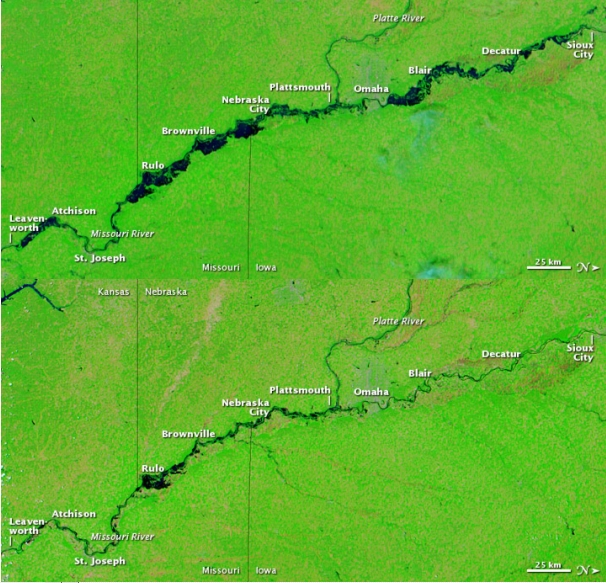
Moderate Resolution Imaging Spectroradiometer comparing the river between Sioux City and Leavenworth on June 30, 2011 (top) and June 29, 2010 (bottom)

On June 1, nearly 3,000 people in Pierre and Fort Pierre were evacuated.

On June 3, South Dakota governor Dennis Daugaard urged residents in the Country Club section of Dakota Dunes (which is below Gavins Point Dam) to evacuate. He noted that it might be two months before they could return.

On June 21, South Dakota reported its first flood fatalities when two women drowned in Lyman County, South Dakota, after they drove their car down a washed out road. The fatalities were unrelated to flooding and increased releases on the Missouri River, but rather related to flash flooding from heavy rains according to the Lyman County Herald of Presho, S.D.

On the same day Pierre, South Dakota, officials estimated costs from the flood would be $13.2 million for that community.

On June 30, the spillway at Big Bend Dam was temporarily closed for inspections.

=== Iowa ===
On June 10, the WinnaVegas Casino, which is owned by the Winnebago Tribe of Nebraska, near Sloan, was inaccessible. Shortly after, a yellow amphibious vehicle known locally as "the Duck" was used to provide transportation from Sloan across the floodwaters to the casino. The Duck now makes annual appearances as a float in Winnebago High School's homecoming parade.

On June 4, near River Mile 575 (near Hamburg), the main levee suffered a partial collapse. One June 5, it suffered a second partial collapse. On June 7, it suffered a third partial collapse. Finally, on June 13, it suffered a total collapse and had a 300 feet (91 m) wide gap. After the first partial collapse, the Corps of Engineers initiated an emergency contract to raise the levee immediately surrounding the town in order to protect it from an estimated 10 feet (3.0 m) of flood water.

On June 22, a mandatory evacuation of all residents in Mills County between Interstate 29 and the Missouri River was declared.

On June 25, a levee breach north of Council Bluffs flooded an area of Harrison County which could impact U.S. Route 30 connecting Blair, Nebraska and Missouri Valley, Iowa. DeSoto National Wildlife Refuge was also impacted by the break in the levee.

On June 27, officials said water "could begin slopping" over the emergency levee at Hamburg on its west side. The Nishnabotna River on its east side was reported to be two feet above flood stage.

On July 1, the main levee near Percival (16 miles north of Hamburg) breached in the early morning hours adding to the flooded conditions from the Hamburg breach. The breach occurred despite a month-long battle by the local residents.

On July 1, the privately owned Vanmann #30 levee at Mile Marker 637 to 637.5 on the Iowa side, about 10 river miles south of the reactor, was blown up by the local levee authority. The levee destruction was done to alleviate flooding in a bend of the river where water was pooling on cropland and creating an enormous water pool directly opposite the reactor. Authorities initially reported a 3-to-4-inch (76 to 102 mm) rise in the river after the levee was blown. Both the US Army Corps of Engineers and the Iowa Department of Natural Resources said they did not regulate the levee. Flooding on the Iowa side had been a source of considerable concern after a June 25 levee breach upstream of the reactor near Missouri Valley, Iowa, prompted evacuations of 18 homes, temporary closing of the Blair Bridge (while flood walls were built to protect the Iowa approach) and closing of DeSoto National Wildlife Refuge on the DeSoto Bend. They had raised the levee height in anticipation of the flood but after the upstream breach they had sought permission to lower it so that water could flow back into the river. When both Iowa and the Corps said they did not have authority over it the levee board blew it up at approximately 10 a.m. on July 1. Pottawattamie County, Iowa, officials initially said they were notified only minutes prior to the levee being blown up, but those overseeing the levee had notified Harrison County, Iowa, officials earlier.

On July 1, the Corps reported that runoff on the river for June was the largest of any month on the river below Sioux City since record keeping began in 1898. June runoff was 13,800,000 acre-feet (17.0 km^{3}), beating the April 1952 record of 13,100,000 acre-feet (16.2 km^{3}). The third highest record was 10,500,000 acre-feet (13.0 km^{3}) which was set in May 2011. The combined runoff for May and June was 24,300,000 acre-feet (30.0 km^{3}). The normal for the entire year is 24,800,000 acre-feet (30.6 km^{3}).

On July 11, officials at Sioux Gateway Airport said they were experiencing higher ticket sales. They speculated that the difficulty of driving from Sioux City and Omaha had spurred the increase.

As flood waters started to recede by late August, flood damage to Interstate highways 29 and 680 north of Council Bluffs, Iowa, was reported as extensive. Discounting the interstate system flood damage to county roads in Pottawattamie County alone was expected to amount to $40 million in repair costs.

=== Nebraska ===
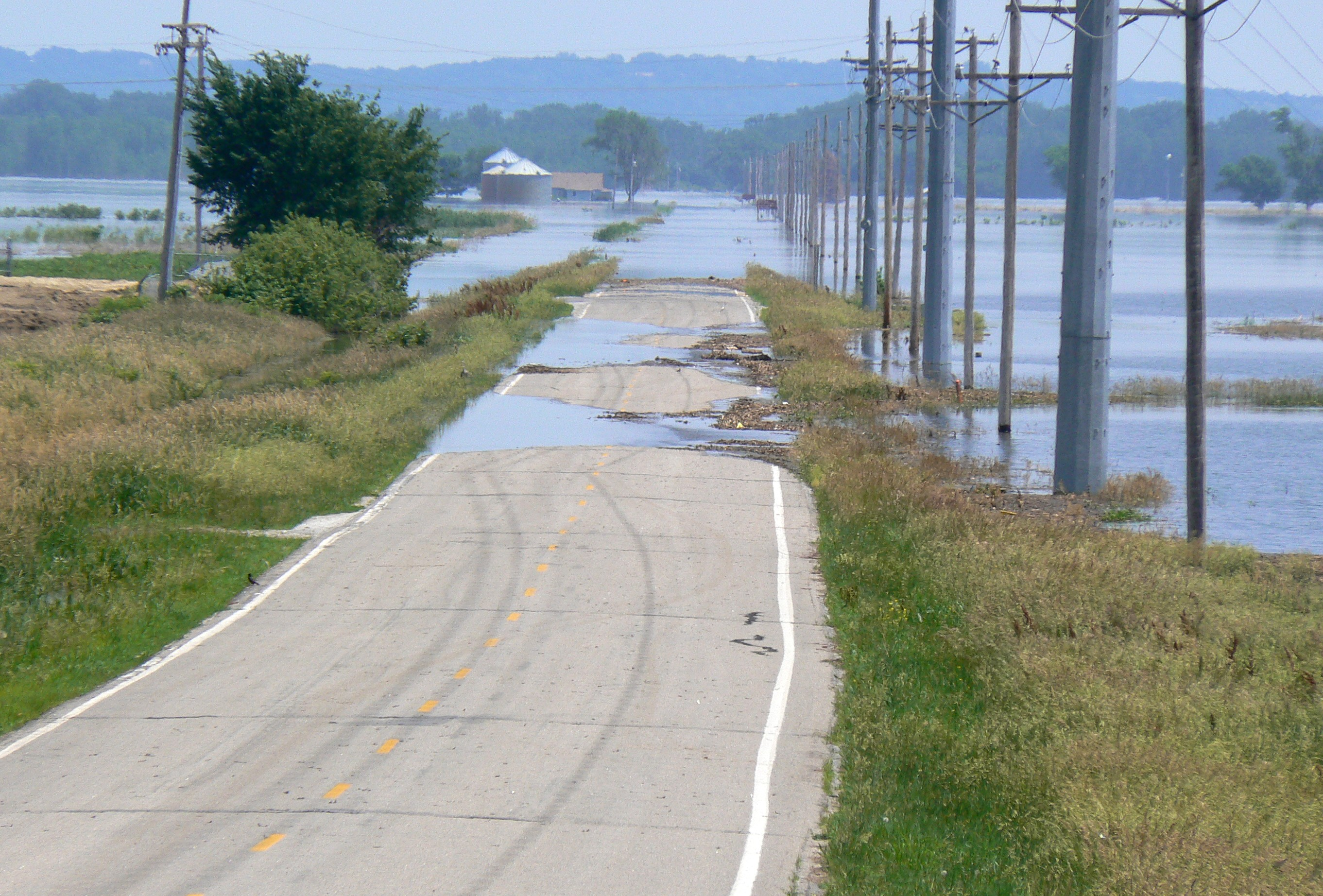
County Road 34 in Fort Calhoun, Nebraska, underwater on June 19. The closer treeline in the distance is the normal west bank of the Missouri River and is part of Boyer Chute National Wildlife Refuge, while the further treeline is the normal east bank of Iowa.

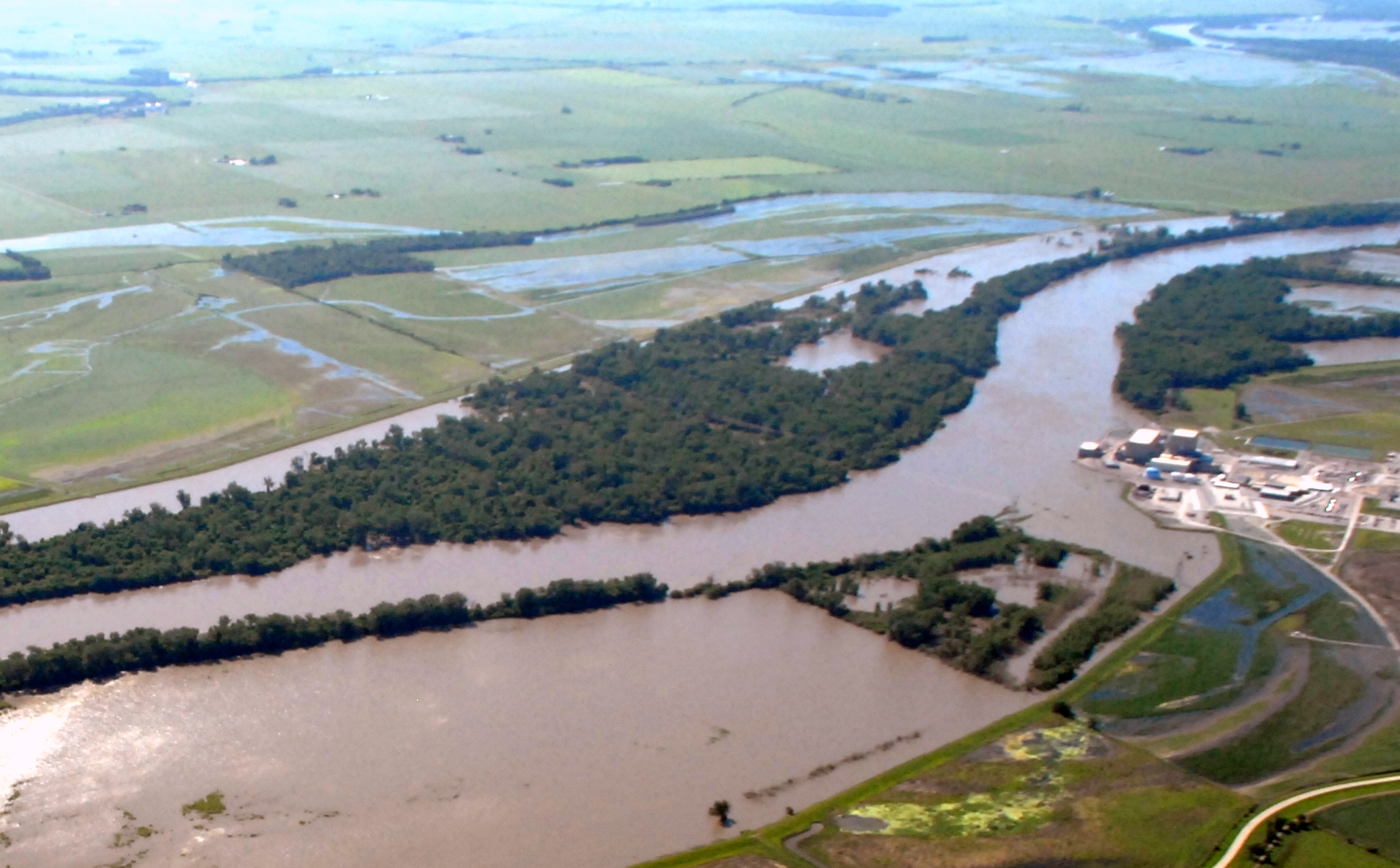
Cooper Nuclear Power Station on the edge of the flood on June 15, 2011

On June 2, Scouts Rest Ranch, Buffalo Bill's home near the Platte River in North Platte, closed because of flood fears. Exhibits were moved and berms were built around the buildings. On July 13, officials said the flooding was not as severe as had been expected.

On June 4, Omaha city officials began releasing 6,000,000 US gallons (23,000 m^{3}) of raw sewage per day into the river from its plant in South Omaha. The city generates about 86,000,000 US gallons (330,000 m^{3}) a day, but only a small percentage is dumped into the river. The city of Omaha installed giant water pumps just east of Qwest Center Omaha to evacuate storm and sewer water directly into the Missouri River. By June 22, the city estimated 3 million dollars had been spent directly towards this flooding event.

On June 9, Nebraska reported its first event-related fatality when a worker was killed while working on a levee at Fort Calhoun when his truck tipped over.

The flooding affected the Fort Calhoun Nuclear Generating Station near Fort Calhoun, Nebraska, where the grounds of the plant were inundated by the flood, however, the plant had been in safe shutdown mode for refueling since April 2011. On June 6, the Federal Aviation Administration placed flight restrictions over the plant within a 2 miles (3.2 km) radius in which planes cannot fly lower than 3,500 feet (1,100 m) over the plant. On June 7, a fire broke out in the plant's switch gear room, prompting the Nuclear Regulatory Commission to declare an "Alert", which is level 2 on the NRC's emergency classification. Officials for the plant's owner, the Omaha Public Power District (OPPD), were confident that enough redundancies were in place to ensure adequate safety. The complex's elevation is 1,004-foot (306 m) elevation above sea level and as of June 19 the river had risen to 1,005.5 feet (306.5 m). Officials from OPPD stated the Calhoun plant could handle water up to 1,014 feet (309 m). An 8 feet (2.4 m) high and 2,000 feet (610 m) long rubber berm surrounded the reactor building. On June 23 a helicopter being used by OPPD to survey transmission lines made an unplanned landing 1.5 miles (2.4 km) south of the plant. The helicopter was photographed lying on its side but there were no reports of injuries. On June 26 the 2,000 feet (610 m) long rubber berm at the plant collapsed after it was punctured by a small earth mover ("Bobcat"). It was reported more than 2 feet (0.61 m) of water rushed in around buildings and electrical transformers. Backup generators were then used to ensure the facility maintained electrical power for cooling. NRC officials were at the plant at the time and NRC statements said the plant remains safe. NRC Chairman Gregory Jaczko confirmed the plant's safety when he visited the plant on June 27. On June 29 officials planned to close the Blair Bridge north of the plant effectively making the river impossible to drive across for 100 miles (160 km) from Sioux City to Omaha—although officials said they hoped to erect flood barriers to reopen it.

At Cooper Nuclear Station, Nebraska Public Power District's (NPPD) nuclear plant near Brownville, a "Notification of Unusual Event" (the least-serious of the NRC emergency classifications) was issued on June 19 due to the flooding. Similar to the situation at Fort Calhoun, the FAA placed a temporary no-fly zone within 2 miles (3.2 km) of the plant on June 7. Officials said, "There is no threat to plant employees or to the public; the plant continues to operate safely." In preparation for the flood more than 5,000 short tons (4,500,000 kg) of sand were bought in for barricades and Hesco barriers protecting facilities at the plant. The plant is 13 feet (4.0 m) above natural grade. On June 19, the river was reported 11.5 feet (3.5 m) above flood stage at Brownville. The Cooper plant sits at 903 feet (275 m) above sea level. The river hit 900.56 feet (274.49 m) on June 19 before dropping slightly to 900.4 feet (274.4 m) on June 20. At 9:47 a.m., July 12 the plant ended its emergency status because the river had dropped to 895.8 feet—3 feet lower than the emergency status level.

On June 23, the main levee 3 miles (4.8 km) north of Brownville bridge breached, prompting an evacuation in Atchison County, MO.

On June 27, officials said 12 of 70 planned dewatering wells at Eppley Airfield in Omaha were functional. The wells pump water collecting around the airport over the levee wall back into the Missouri River.

On June 29, Nebraska reported its first flood-related death when the body of a 26-year-old fisherman was found in the river near the Little Nemaha River at Nemaha.

On July 1, the flood level at Omaha hit 36.29 feet (11.06 m), higher than the 30.26 feet (9.22 m) on July 10, 1993, during the 1993 flood but lower than the all-time record of 40.2 feet (12.3 m) on April 18, 1952.

On July 2, the Corps of Engineers awarded a $1.4 million contract to shore up the 9 miles (14 km) levee system around Eppley Airfield with a seepage berm to allow water to seep through the levee but hold the levee materials in place. The action came after the Corps reported there were multiple sand boils on the airport side of the levee.

On July 3, Lindbergh Road which rings Eppley by the levees was closed so work could continue on 70 relief wells by the levees.

On July 5, the National Geospatial-Intelligence Agency reported that 265 square miles (690 km^{2}) of Nebraska has been inundated by floods on the Missouri and the Platte River. At the same time NASA released satellite photos of the flood from the Landsat 5 showing flooding from Blair to Plattsmouth to June 30.

On July 9, the Corps of Engineers said water behind the reservoirs had peaked on July 2 with only 1.5 percent left for flood storage. By July 9, the available storage increased to 3.1 percent. Officials said they planned to begin decreasing the water flowing to the Gavins Point Dam but noted that the water going into Gavins Point would fill it in 1.5 days if the reservoir were empty.

On July 11, the Omaha World-Herald quoted USGS researchers who are studying unique aspects of the flood. Among their discoveries:

- the flood water which is predominately coming from behind dams is clear rather than the traditional silt that gives the Missouri its Big Muddy nickname;
- the river normally flows at 4 miles (6.4 km) per hour but in the early days of the flood it was flowing at 11.6 miles (18.7 km) per hour
- the river depth of the channel at Nebraska City is normally 12 to 16 feet (3.7 to 4.9 m) and, during high water, can be 25 to 30 feet (7.6 to 9.1 m) but during this event they recorded depths of 66 feet (20 m).

On July 13, OPPD said it had spent $26 million in June as a result of flooding affecting its power plants on the river ($20 million in work protecting its plants and $6 million in replacing lost generating capacity). OPPD has two coal-fired plants that are both larger than Fort Calhoun at Nebraska City. One of the rail lines providing coal was covered in water and the utility wanted to raise that track. The plants had been getting coal via a parallel line.

In Omaha, after peaking at 36.29 feet (11.06 m) on July 2, 2011, the river was still more than 3 feet (0.91 m) above the flood stage of 29 feet (8.8 m) as of August 28.

=== Missouri ===
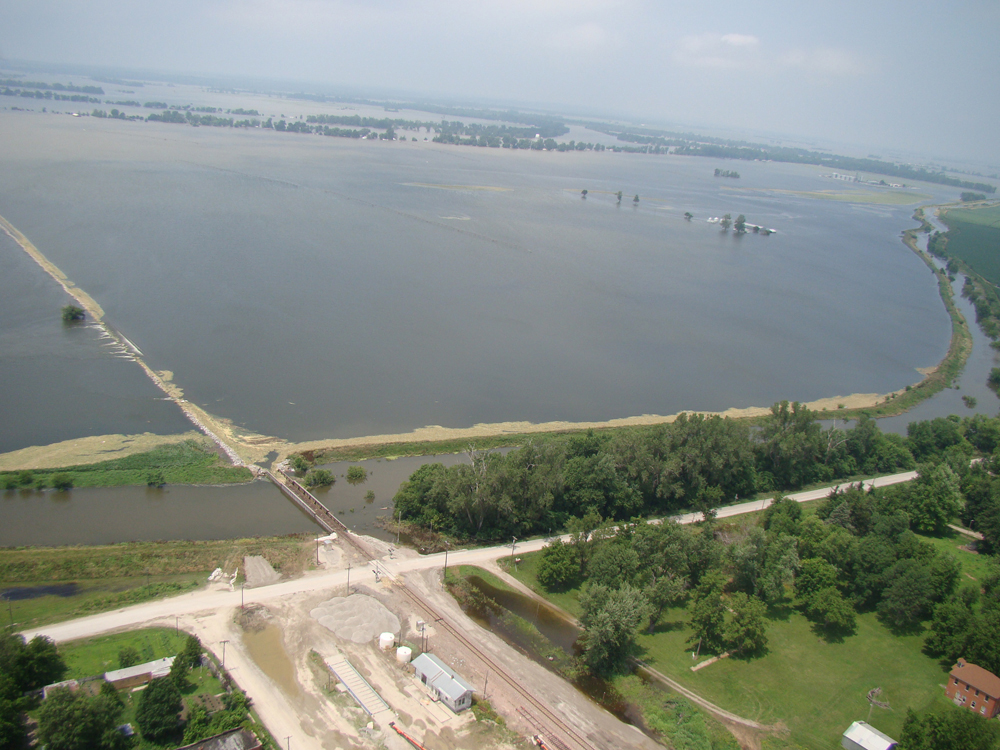
Looking toward Rulo and Big Lake (the latter of which is obliterated in the trees) from Fortescue, Missouri, as the River reached a width of more than 5 miles on June 26. The line going across the water is the BNSF rail line which is the main line for providing coal to Kansas City's giant Iatan, Missouri, powerplant. BNSF raised the line 20 inches but it was still overtopped and is closed.

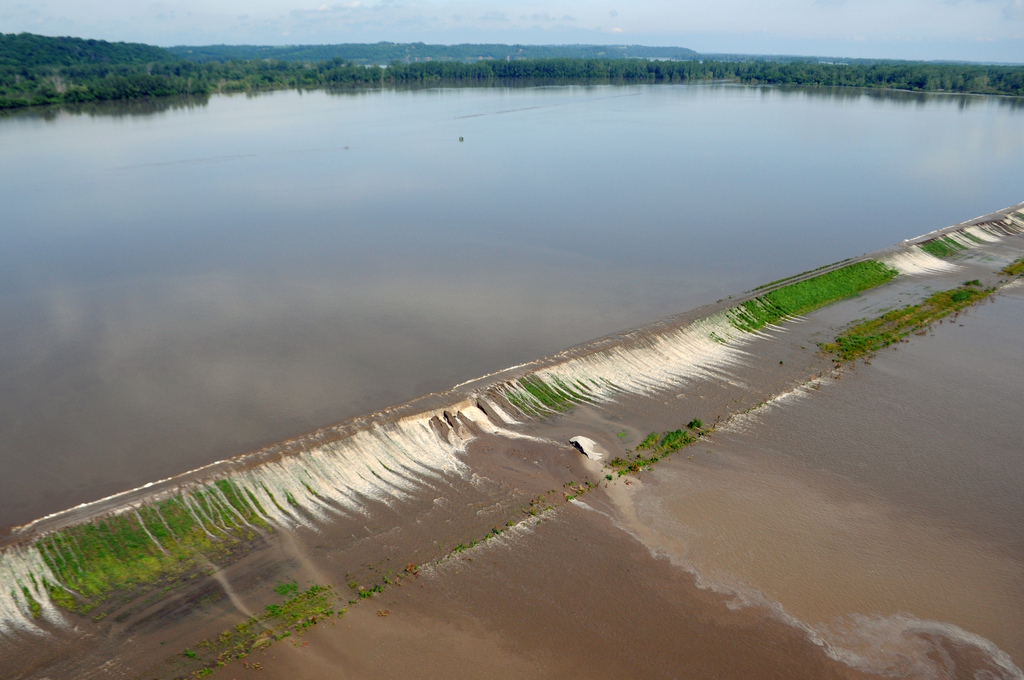
Breaching of the levee at Mile 550 in Atchison County on June 19

On June 6, the Kansas City Corps of Engineers sent letters from its Real Estate Division to landowners along the river in northwest Missouri, telling them that through the Water Resources Development Act of 1986 via the Missouri River Bank Stabilization and Navigation Project and Missouri River Fish and Wildlife Mitigation Project that they were seeking willing sellers for land "for fish and wildlife habitat enhancements for aquatic species such as the pallid sturgeon." The letters arrived just as the floods began hitting their peak in Atchison County and subsequently were heavily criticized by state and federal politicians. The Corps reported that only 14 letters had been sent.

Interstate 29 closed in early June from Iowa Highway 2 (across the Missouri River from Nebraska City, Nebraska) to Rock Port, Missouri.

The United States Coast Guard closed the river to boaters from Gavins Point Dam (Mile Post 850) to Mile Post 450 near St. Joseph, Missouri.

Residents of Big Lake (which had evacuated during several floods including one in 2010) evacuated in May. On June 16, 2011, the community filed an injunction in Holt County against BNSF after the railroad elevated its line near the community by 20 inches (510 mm) in preparation for the flood. Big Lake officials said the elevation would create a "bathtub" effect, trapping water in the community.

On June 19 a levee in Atchison County was breached and the levee protecting Big Lake was breached near Corning, Missouri, at Mile Marker 550. The crest at Brownville at 44.6 feet (13.6 m) was the highest in the history of the river there (breaking the 1993 record). It prompted officials to close the two northernmost Missouri River bridges in the state, the Brownville Bridge (US 136) and the Rulo Bridge (US 159). The river had risen more than two feet in 24 hours in Atchison County. Officials said the surge in the river occurred when heavy rains in northern Iowa caused a major rise in the Nishnabotna River, which enters the Missouri River in Atchison County near Watson.

On June 21, 300 residents of Craig in Holt County were ordered to evacuate.

On June 24, Lewis and Clark State Park near Rushville closed.

On June 26 BNSF had to close its main rail line providing coal to Kansas City's Iatan Powerplant (via Rulo) after the river widened in Holt County to nearly 5+ miles by Big Lake.

On June 27 Terrible's St. Jo Frontier Casino riverboat casino closed. Levee toppings prompted the closure of Lewis and Clark Village, Missouri. Residents of the Sugar Lake area of Buchanan County were also under voluntary evacuation orders

On June 28 Squaw Creek National Wildlife Refuge in Holt County closed its tour route around its pools noting that it no longer control water levels in its pools and that it expects "critical habitat damage to our management areas including the moist soil units, wet prairie, and other priceless wildlife habitats and most habitats will be submerged."

On June 28, the Corps ordered Ameren to halt all outflows (including electrical generation) from Bagnell Dam on the Osage River until at least July 5.

On June 29, officials at Missouri's largest coal-fired power plant at Iatan, Missouri, sent 40 of its 135 employees home because of fears that the river would cut off its access on Missouri Route 45. Employees were parking a mile from the plant being shuttled in.

On June 30 the St. Joseph News-Press reported that residents of Holt County had dubbed the flood "Corpstrina" (pronounced Kor-TRINA) evoking the Corps of Engineers which regulates the river and the Hurricane Katrina disaster.

On July 2 Amtrak announced that two miles (3 km) of track between Kansas City and St. Louis was flooded between Myrick (west of Lexington) and Marshall. The railroad suspended the 311 and 316 trains of the Missouri River Runner but continued to maintain other traffic via trains rerouted to the Sedalia subdivision.

On July 3 a planned fireworks display in Richard Berkley Riverfront Park in Kansas City proceeded as planned and included the unveiling of a new lighting scheme on the Christopher Bond Bridge (Mile 365). The crest at Kansas City of 32.46 feet (9.89 m) on July 2 was well below Kansas City's all time crest of 48.87 feet (14.90 m) in 1993.

On July 4 St. Charles held its Riverfront fireworks display on the river—although moved back a block to Riverside Drive from Frontier Park. It had crested there on July 3 at 28.03 feet (8.54 m)—well below its crest of 40.11 in 1884 and 40.04 feet (12.20 m) in 1993.

On July 6 a breach at Atchison County that had started on June 19 widened to 600 feet (180 m). Missouri National Guard Blackhawk helicopters were used to bring in 2,000 pound sand bags to reinforce the Sugar Tree levee in Carroll County, Missouri, near Mile 300 at Norborne after a third of the landside part of the levee slid.

On July 11 the Coast Guard closed the river above Glasgow, Missouri, at Mile 226 to navigation.

=== Kansas ===
On June 22, Leavenworth closed Sherman Army Airfield. On June 29 the levee was breached and water reached the hangars which had earlier been evacuated.

On June 29 the Elwood, Kansas, south bound exit ramp off the Pony Express Bridge was closed temporarily to pump water which had accumulated from rains. Elwood also underwent voluntary evacuations. 200 National Guard troops were deployed to Doniphan County to assist in the evacuation. 400 of Elwood's 1,200 residents voluntarily evacuated.

The Amelia Earhart Bridge at Atchison had effectively closed on June 28. Closings of Missouri River bridges had been the result of flooding on the approaches and not the bridge itself. However, on June 29 photos began circulating that the low-lying Atchison Union Pacific rail bridge was close to water level. Union Pacific had embargoed its main rail line which goes between St. Joseph and Kansas City.

On July 1 the Corps of Engineers reported that every non-federal levee from Rulo to Wolcott, Kansas, in Wyandotte County, Kansas, on both sides of the river were either overtopped or breached. Included in the overtoppings was Kansas Department of Corrections land below the Lansing Correctional Facility at Lansing, Kansas. Another report indicated that the only overtopped federal levee was the one at Fort Leavenworth by Sherman Army Airfield.

== Liability ==
In 2023, the U.S. Court of Appeals for the Federal Circuit upheld a lower court’s 2020 ruling that the U.S. Army Corps of Engineers was responsible for worsened flooding since 2007 that killed crops and wrecked homes and businesses.
