= Winthrop, Missouri =

Unincorporated community in Missouri, U.S.

Coordinates: 39°33′35″N 95°06′27″W

Winthrop is an unincorporated community in southwest Buchanan County, in the U.S. state of Missouri. The community is just east of the Missouri River and Atchison, Kansas on US Route 59 and Missouri routes 45 and 273. Rushville is approximately 4.5 miles northeast on US Route 59 and Lewis and Clark Village adjacent to the Lewis and Clark State Park and lake is 3.5 miles southeast.

== History ==
An variant name was "East Atchison". A post office called Winthrop was established in 1861, the name was changed to East Atchison in 1878, and the post office closed in 1923. The present name is after John Winthrop (1587–1649), second governor of the Massachusetts Bay Colony and an English Puritan leader.
