= Missouri Route 138 =

State highway in Missouri, U.S.

Route 138
- MO 138; mainline in red, spur in blue

Route information
- Maintained by MoDOT
- Length: 1.112 mi (1.790 km)

Major junctions
- West end: Lakeshore Drive in Lewis and Clark State Park
- East end: Route 45 / Route 273 north of Iatan

Location
- Country: United States
- State: Missouri

Highway system
- Missouri State Highway System; Interstate; US; State; Supplemental
← Route 137	→ Route 139

Missouri Route 138 is a short highway (about one mile) in southern Buchanan County, Missouri, United States. Its eastern terminus is at Route 45/Route 273 north of Iatan. Its western terminus is in Lewis and Clark State Park. There are no towns on the highway.

== Route description ==
Western Terminus of MO 138

Route 138 begins on the south shore of Lewis and Clark Lake in the community of Lewis and Clark Village within Lewis and Clark State Park, where the road continues east as Lake Shore Drive. From the beginning point, the route heads southwest on two-lane undivided Lake Shore Drive, passing fields and woods in the state park. The road turns to the east and becomes Lakecrest Boulevard, intersecting Lake Shore Drive again. Route 138 comes to its eastern terminus at an intersection with Route 45/Route 273.

== Major intersections ==
The entire route is in Lewis and Clark Village, Buchanan County.

mi	km	Destinations	Notes
0.000	0.000	Lewis and Clark Lake	Western terminus; road continues north as Lake Shore Drive
0.123	0.198	Route 138 Spur	Unsigned
1.112	1.790	Route 45 / Route 273 – Rushville, Weston	Eastern terminus
1.000 mi = 1.609 km; 1.000 km = 0.621 mi
