= Short Creek =

Short Creek may mean:

- Short Creek (Iowa River), a stream in Iowa
- Short Creek (Bean Lake), a stream in Missouri
- Short Creek (Tennessee River), a stream in Tennessee
- Short Creek, a tributary of the Ohio River
- Short Creek, a tributary of the Souris River
- Short Creek, West Virginia
- Short Creek Township, Harrison County, Ohio
- Short Creek, Arizona, now known as Colorado City, Arizona
- the Short Creek Community, residing in Colorado City, Arizona and Hildale, Utah, which after 1953 fractured into several Mormon fundamentalist groups
- the Short Creek raid, a 1953 Arizona state police and Arizona National Guard action against Mormon fundamentalists in the Short Creek Community
