= Short Creek (Bean Lake tributary) =

Stream in Platte County, Missouri, U.S.

Coordinates: 39°30′06″N 95°00′43″W

Short Creek is a stream in Platte County in the U.S. state of Missouri. It is a tributary of Bean Lake.

Short Creek was so named on account of its relatively short length. It sources from the Missouri River Valley bluffs north of Iatan and flows southwest, crossing Route 45/273, and then flows into Bean Lake in the Missouri River floodplain.

== See also ==
- List of rivers of Missouri
