= Rush Township, Buchanan County, Missouri =

Township in Buchanan County, Missouri, U.S.

Rush Township
- Township
- Coordinates: 39°33′51″N 95°03′39″W
- Country: United States
- State: Missouri
- County: Buchanan

Area
  - Total: 27.71 sq mi (71.8 km^{2})
  - Land: 26.36 sq mi (68.3 km^{2})
  - Water: 1.35 sq mi (3.5 km^{2}) 4.87%
- Elevation: 791 ft (241 m)

Population (2020)
  - Total: 710
  - Density: 26.9/sq mi (10.4/km^{2})
- FIPS code: 29-02163542
- GNIS feature ID: 766344

Rush Township is a township in Buchanan County, Missouri, United States. At the 2020 census, its population was 710.

Rush Township was established in the 1840s.

== Geography ==
Rush Township covers an area of 27.64 square miles (71.6 km^{2}) and contains two incorporated settlements: Lewis and Clark Village and Rushville. It contains four cemeteries: Armstrong, Gore, Hudspeth and Sugar Creek.

Lewis and Clark Lake and Mud Lake are within this township. The streams of Goose Creek, Horseshoe Slough, Little Sugar Creek and Lost Creek run through this township.

== Transportation ==
Rush Township contains one airport or landing strip, East Atchison Airport (historical).

The following highways travel through the township:

- U.S. Route 59
- Route 45
- Route 116
- Route 138
- Route HH
- Route KK
- Route M
