= Missouri Route 92 =

State highway in Missouri, U.S.

Route 92
- MO 92 highlighted in red

Route information
- Maintained by MoDOT
- Length: 39.603 mi (63.735 km)
- Existed: 1922–present

Major junctions
- West end: K-92 at the Kansas state line in Leavenworth, KS
- I-29 in Platte City; US 169 in Smithville; I-35 in Kearney
- East end: US 69 in Excelsior Springs

Location
- Country: United States
- State: Missouri
- Counties: Platte; Clay

Highway system
- Missouri State Highway System; Interstate; US; State; Supplemental
← Route 91	→ Route 94

Route 92 is a highway in Platte and Clay counties in northwestern Missouri, United States. Its western terminus is a continuation of K-92 on the Centennial Bridge over the Missouri River at the Kansas state line, and the eastern terminus is at U.S. Route 69 in northern Excelsior Springs.

Route 92 is one of the original 1922 state highways. Its eastern terminus was south of Smithville and was later extended east.

== Route Description ==
Route 92 begins at the Centennial Bridge of the Missouri River and travels over 3.5 miles northeasterly where it junctions with Route 45 at Beverly. From there, the highway travels 4 miles east to reach Tracy, then continues southeast through Platte City before junctioning with I-29. Heading east, Route 92 traces the northern boundary of Kansas City for over 2 miles before continuing easterly 6 miles to where it enters into Clay County and reaches the southern stretches of Smithville at its junction with US-169.

Running east, Route 92 passes south of Smithville Lake and travels about 11.5 miles before intersecting I-35 and Route 33 immediately after, all in Kearney. The highway continues easterly and passes south of Watkins Woolen Mill State Park before reaching US-69 in the north stretches of Excelsior Springs.

== Major intersections ==
County	Location	mi	km	Destinations	Notes
Missouri River		0.000	0.000	K-92 west – Leavenworth	Continuation into Kansas
Missouri River		0.000	0.000	Centennial Bridge; Kansas–Missouri state line	
Platte		0.697	1.122	Route 45 Spur – Farley	
Platte	Beverly	3.674	5.913	Route 45 / Lewis and Clark Trail – Weston, Parkville, Weston Bend State Park, Lewis and Clark State Park	
Platte	Tracy	8.07	12.99	Route 92 Spur	
Platte	Platte City	10.618	17.088	I-29 / US 71 – St. Joseph, Kansas City	I-29 Exit 18
Clay	Smithville	20.603	33.157	US 169 to I-435 – Smithville, Smithville Lake	
Clay	Kearney	31.935	51.394	I-35 / Route 110 (CKC) – Des Moines, Kansas City	I-35 Exit 26
Clay	Kearney	32.485	52.280	Route 33 (Jefferson Street) to US 69 – Holt, Business District	
Clay	Excelsior Springs	39.603	63.735	US 69 – Lawson, Excelsior Springs	
1.000 mi = 1.609 km; 1.000 km = 0.621 mi
