= Bear Creek (Missouri River tributary) =

Stream in Missouri, U.S.

Bear Creek is a stream in Platte County in the U.S. state of Missouri. It is a tributary of the Missouri River.

The stream headwaters arise at 39°31′04″N 94°53′40″W at an elevation of approximately 1130 feet. The stream flows to the south-southwest passing the community of Dye. It continues flowing to the south passing under Missouri Route 45 just before entering the Missouri River floodplain about one mile east of the community of Sadler. The stream follows the east margin of the floodplain past the community of Weston and enters the Missouri along the west boundary of the Weston Bend State Park at 39°23′40″N 94°53′34″W at an elevation of 751 feet.

Bear Creek was so named due to the presence of black bears in the area.

== Tributaries ==
There are three name tributaries of Bear Creek: Wells Branch, Benner Branch, and Brills Creek.

== See also ==
- List of tributaries of the Missouri River
- List of rivers of Missouri
