= East Leavenworth, Missouri =

Extinct hamlet in Missouri, U.S.

Coordinates: 39°18′52″N 94°51′07″W

East Leavenworth is an unincorporated community in Platte County, Missouri, United States. It is located on Route 45, approximately three miles east of Leavenworth, Kansas. It is within the Kansas City metropolitan area.

A post office called East Leavenworth was established in 1883, and remained in operation until 1966. The community was so named on account of its location east of Leavenworth, Kansas.
