= Beverly, Missouri =

Unincorporated community in Missouri, U.S.

Coordinates: 39°22′05″N 94°52′02″W

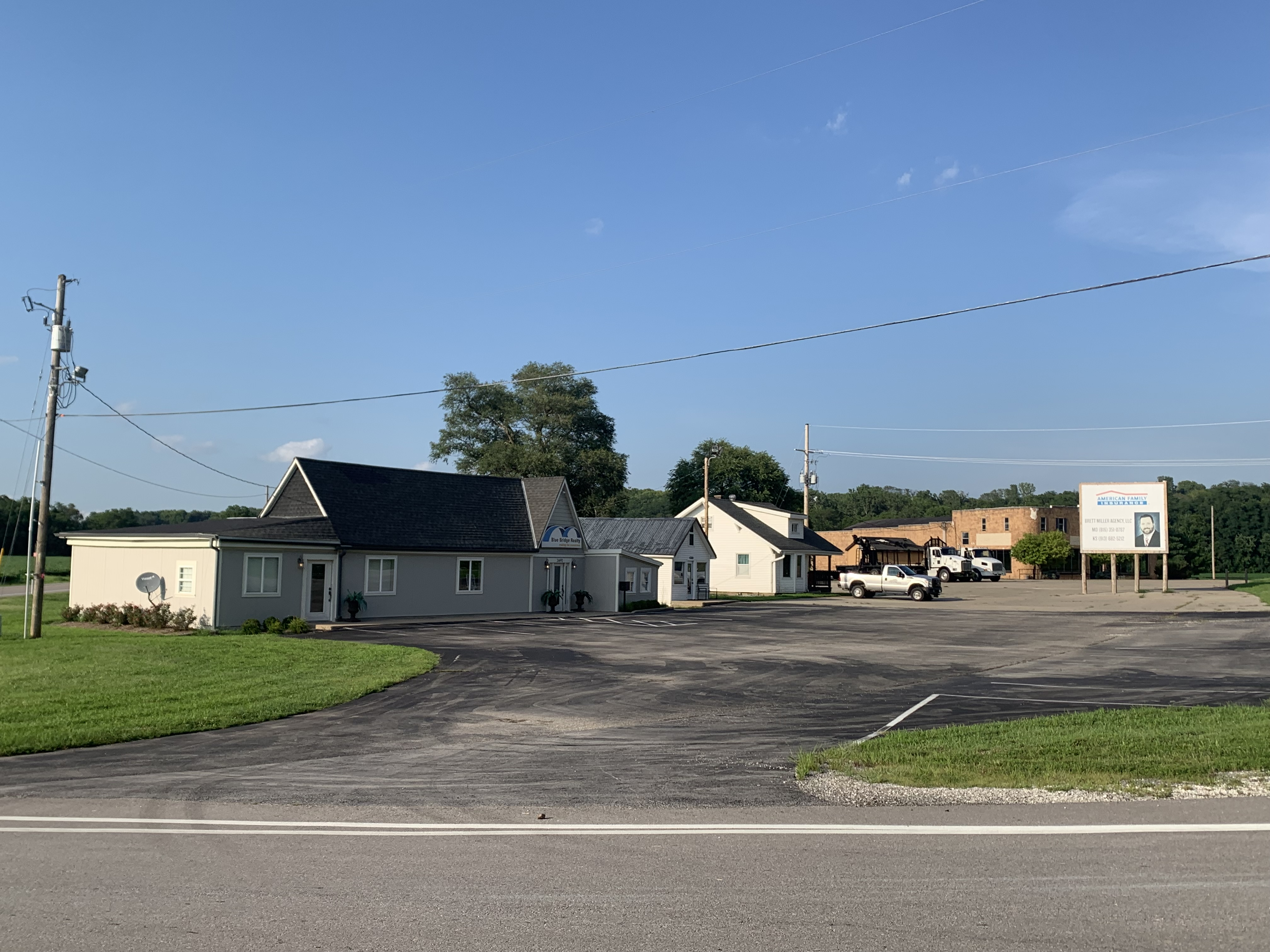
Beverly, Missouri from Missouri Route 45 in western Fair Township

Beverly is an unincorporated community in Platte County, in the U.S. state of Missouri. It is within the Kansas City metropolitan area.

The community is located at the confluence of Bee Creek with the Missouri River Floodplain. Missouri Route 92 and Missouri Route 45 pass through the community. Platte City lies four miles to the east on Route 92. Weston Bend State Park is just to the north on Route 45.

== History ==
Variant names include Beverly Station and Beverly Junction because it was located where the Kansas City, St. Joseph, and Council Bluffs Railroad and Chicago, Rock Island, and Pacific Railroad met. A post office called Beverly Station was established in 1874, the name was changed to Beverly in 1946, and the post office closed in 1960. The community was named after one Mr. Beverly, a railroad employee.
