= Kansas and Missouri Bridge =

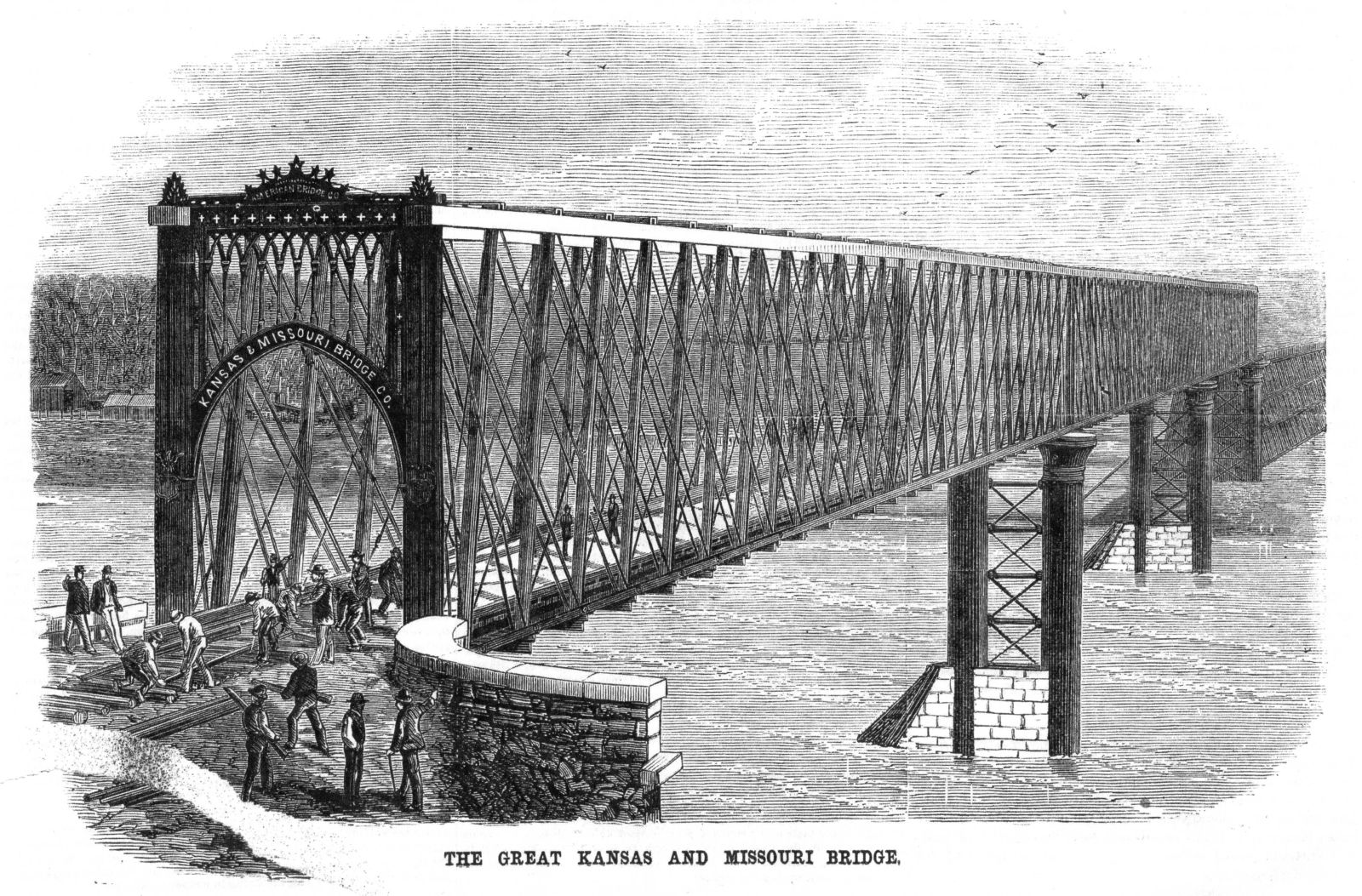
- Sketch of the Fort Bridge
- Coordinates: 39°20′59″N 94°54′38″W
- Carries: Rail, road and pedestrians
- Crosses: Missouri River
- Locale: Leavenworth, Kansas to Kansas

Characteristics
- Design: Post through truss
- Material: Wrought iron
- Trough construction: Cast iron
- Longest span: 340 feet (100 m)
- No. of spans: 3
- Piers in water: 2
- Clearance below: 51 feet 6 inches (15.70 m)

History
- Engineering design by: W. W. Wright
- Constructed by: L.B. Boomer and Company
- Construction start: July 20, 1869
- Construction cost: US $800,000
- Replaced by: Centennial Bridge

The Kansas and Missouri Bridge (also known as the Fort Bridge, the Fort Leavenworth Bridge, and the Old Rock Island Bridge) was an iron truss bridge across the Missouri River at Fort Leavenworth. The bridge opened in 1872 and closed permanently in 1955.

== Description ==
The bridge was located 1 3/8 miles (2.2 km) north of town of Leavenworth, where the river was considered to be the narrowest. The bridge was a Post through truss constructed of two types of iron. The truss used 2,093,900 pounds (949,800 kg) of wrought iron and 700,417 pounds (317,704 kg) of cast iron. The truss was configured with three spans. The western and center span were both 340 feet (100 m), and the eastern span was 314 feet (96 m). The deck of the bridge was wooden, and was laid flush with the top of the rails so that both trains and wagons could use the bridge. Foundations for the truss were constructed with pneumatic caissons. The western approach roadway was 1,500 feet (460 m). The eastern approach included 1,600 feet (490 m) of wooden trestle bridge and another 2,400 feet (730 m) to bring the rail elevation down where it connect to other railways. The bridge provided a navigational clearance of 51 feet 6 inches (15.70 m).

== History ==
=== Planning and construction ===
The Kansas and Missouri Bridge Company was established on November 12, 1867 to build a privately owned bridge across the river. The 40th U.S. Congress passed an act approving the interstate bridge and also authorizing the bridge to connect to Fort Leavenworth. Congress established that the bridge would be a national post road, required the bridge to have a minimum 50 feet (15 m) of navigation clearance, and set minimum main span length over the river.

William Wierman (W. W.) Wright was employed as the chief engineer for the project, named at the recommendation of William T. Sherman. Wright had been a general in the Army Corps of Engineers overseeing military railroad construction. The selected contractor was L. B. Boomer and Company, who merged into the American Bridge Company (Chicago) before the bridge was completed.

The Kansas and Missouri Bridge Company issued stock and bonds each to raise funds to build the bridge. Leavenworth County provided $300,000 of bonds. The construction contractor accepted $175,000 of bonds as part of his payment.

Construction began on July 20, 1869. On April 10, 1872, the bridge was load tested. The bridge was loaded with a weight of one ton per linear foot of the truss spans (2,000 pounds per foot (3,000 kg/m)). The deflection of the span was less than 3 inches (7.6 cm), which was considered a satisfactory test result. The bridge was dedicated on April 18, 1872.

The Leavenworth Times reported that there were twenty-five thousand people present for the opening of the bridge. Trains of the Rock Island Line and the steamship Ella brought visitors for the day. The procession stretched from the center of Leavenworth to the center of the bridge, two miles in length. The ceremony was presided by Daniel Anthony, mayor of Leavenworth, president of the Kansas and Missouri Bridge Company, and publisher of the Leavenworth Times. Speakers included Robert P C Wilson and Kansas Governor James Harvey.

=== Operation ===
In 1893, the Terminal Bridge opened then became the primary crossing for rail traffic at Leavenworth. Toll and rail use income was not sufficient to pay interest and principal on the bonds.

The bridge served three railroads until 1893, when fire damage to the timber trestle bridge approach led to the bridge being closed.

By 1900, the Company was in default for the bonds sold and the US Court ordered that the bridge be sold. The amount owed to bond holders was $961,949.40. The court set the minimum auction price at $10,000.

In 1917, the bridge was seized by the federal government as a war measure (the bridge connected to Fort Leavenworth).

In 1924, the bridge was inspected and determined to be able to be reopened as a vehicular bridge. The bridge had been under the control of the War Department when Representative Daniel Read Anthony Jr. of Kansas and Senator James A. Reed of Missouri passed a bill appropriating $50,000 for the purchase by the Justice Department of what remained of the superstructure and substructure. The Justice Department would be able to use the bridge to access land on the east side of the river that could be farmed for food in the Leavenworth Penitentiary. On June 26, 1926, the bridge reopened as a toll-free vehicular bridge.

=== Replacement ===
At the end of the bridge's service in 1955, it was owned by the Department of Justice and maintained by the highway departments of Kansas and Missouri. The bridge was demolished after the Centennial Bridge opened downriver, providing a better vehicular connection to downtown Leavenworth.

== See also ==
- Truss bridge
- History of rail transportation in the United States
