= Long Creek (Iowa River tributary) =

Stream in Louisa and Washington County, Iowa, U.S.

Coordinates: 41.236139°N 91.264596°W

Long Creek is a stream in Louisa and Washington counties, Iowa, in the United States. It is a tributary of the Iowa River.

Long Creek was so named from the fact it is longer than nearby Short Creek.

== See also ==
- List of rivers of Iowa
