= Centennial Bridge (Leavenworth, Kansas) =

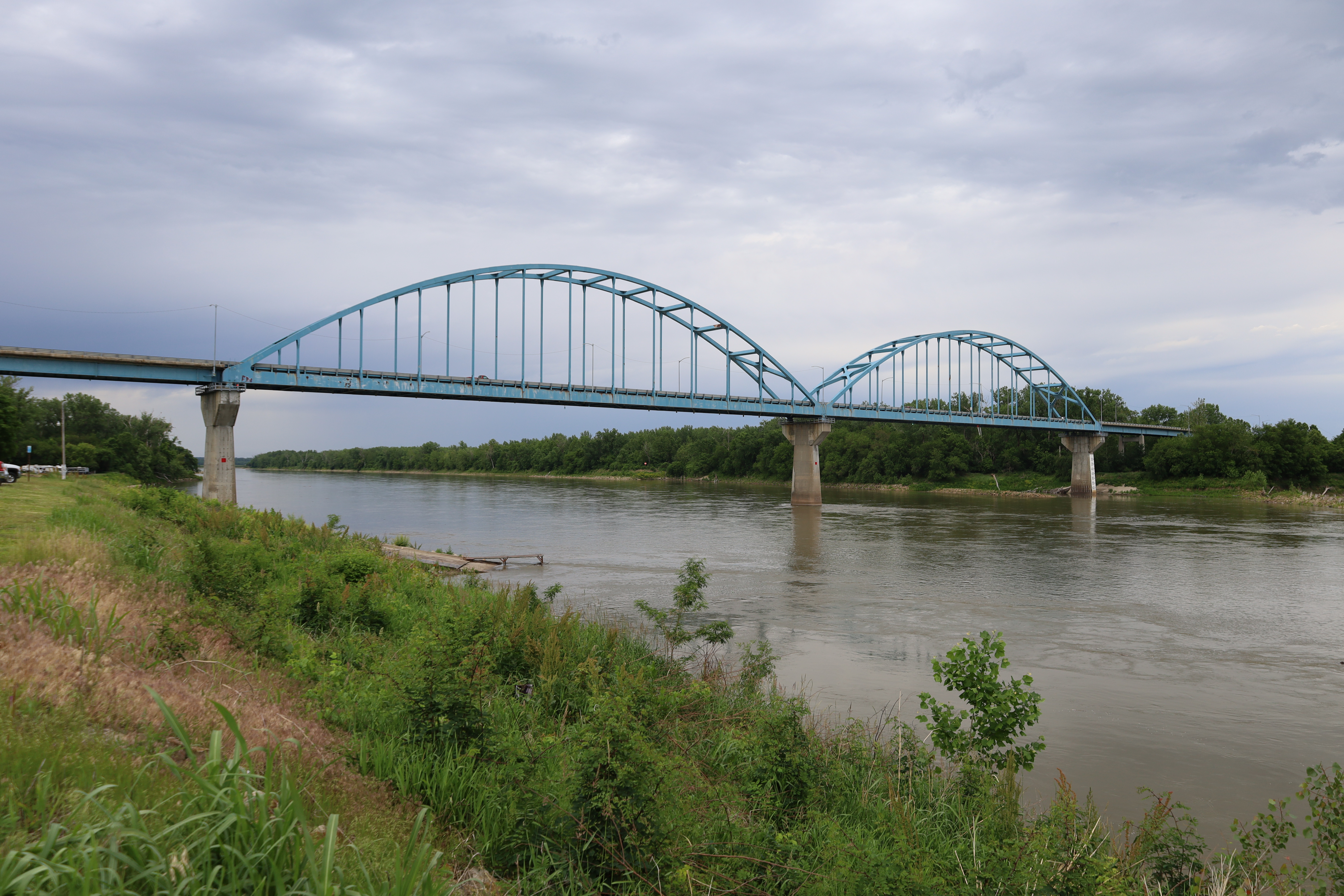
- The bridge in 2025
- Coordinates: 39°19′47″N 94°54′30″W
- Carries: K-92 / Route 92
- Crosses: Missouri River
- Locale: Leavenworth, Kansas to Missouri
- Maintained by: Kansas Department of Transportation

Characteristics
- Design: Through arch bridge
- Total length: 2,571.2 feet
- Longest span: 419.8 feet

History
- Opened: April 2, 1955

The Centennial Bridge is a through arch bridge road bridge over the Missouri River connecting Leavenworth, Kansas, and Platte County, Missouri. Constructed in 1955, it was initially a toll bridge. The bridge opened in 1955, a year after Leavenworth celebrated its centennial as the first city incorporated in Kansas. It is a two-span arch bridge connecting K-92 and Missouri Route 92. Its main span is 419.8 feet, and its total length is 2,571.2 feet. During the construction a spur of Route 45 called the "Leavenworth cutoff" was built to speed traffic to Kansas City, Missouri. The two-mile spur, even though it is in Missouri, was maintained by the city of Leavenworth until the tolls were removed from the Centennial Bridge in May 1977. The bridge is now maintained by the Kansas Department of Transportation.

== History ==
The Centennial Bridge replaced the Fort Bridge, which opened in 1872. The old bridge was a mile upstream and connected Fort Leavenworth and the penitentiary farm.

The bridge opened with a ribbon cutting on April 2, 1955. Five thousand were in attendance to see Representative William R. Hull of Missouri and Senator Frank Carlson of Kansas cut the ribbon. The bridge cost $3.5 million to build and opened as a toll road to repay bonds used to finance the construction. Tolls were initially set at $0.15 for passenger cars and $0.15 per axle for trucks. A plaque on one of the piers read "A memorial dedicated to those who gave their lives to their country, 1854-1954." Six and a half miles [~10.46 km] of new road and bridge was needed to connect to Metropolitan Avenue in Leavenworth on the Kansas side and Route 45 and the existing section Missouri Route 92 on the Missouri side.

Toll revenue was less than expected after the bridge opened. A portion of vehicles that crossed the Fort Bridge were going to Platte County, where cigarettes and alcohol could be purchased at a lower price. When the Centennial Bridge opened, the toll cost plus the alcohol law that prohibited possession of out-of-state beverages reduced traffic on the new bridge below expectations.

=== Potential replacement ===
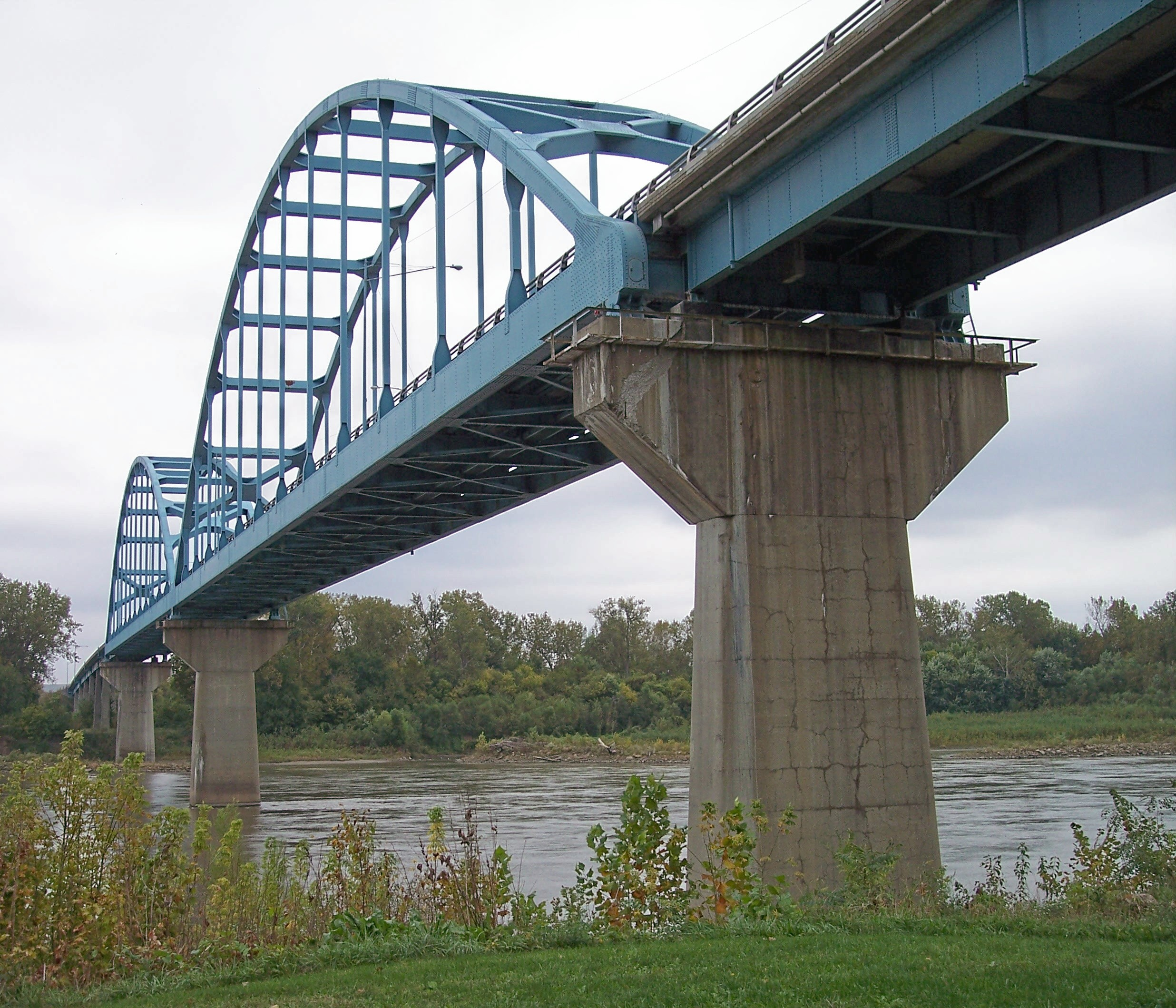
The bridge in 2006

In 2016, the City of Leavenworth, Kansas Department of Transportation, Missouri Department of Transportation and other partners began a location study to plan for replacement of the bridge. The "Route 92 Centennial Bridge Study," conducted by professional engineers and planners, determined that the current site is the best location for a replacement bridge, recommended a 4-lane single-span bridge and recommended tolling to pay for the bridge since little funding was available.

In early 2020, Kansas Governor Laura Kelly announced an Eisenhower Legacy Transportation Program that included the K-92 Centennial Bridge in its plans for replacement. Date of construction is to be determined.

== See also ==
- List of crossings of the Missouri River
