= Bean Lake (Missouri) =

Lake in Missouri, U.S.

- Location within Missouri Location within the United States
- Location: Marshall Township, Platte County, Missouri
- Coordinates: 39°29′07″N 95°01′00″W
- Type: Lake
- Basin countries: United States
- Surface area: 420 acres (170 ha)
- Surface elevation: 774 ft (236 m)

Bean Lake is an oxbow lake in northwestern Platte County in the U.S. state of Missouri. The lake is intermittently full, depending on precipitation, and is 420 acres in area.

== History ==
Bean Lake is named for Benjamin Bean, a pioneer citizen. The lake was formed some time before the 1850s due to a shift in the Missouri River. It was previously known as Short Creek Lake due to its tributary, Short Creek, though the lake was renamed to Bean Lake in the 1870s.
