= Short Creek (Iowa River tributary) =

Stream in Louisa and Washington County, Iowa, U.S.

Coordinates: 41.286692°N 91.352377°W

Short Creek is a stream in Louisa and Washington counties, Iowa, in the United States. It is a tributary of the Iowa River.

Short Creek was so named from the fact it is shorter than nearby Long Creek.

== See also ==
- List of rivers of Iowa
