= Tracy, Missouri =

City in Platte County, Missouri, United States

- City
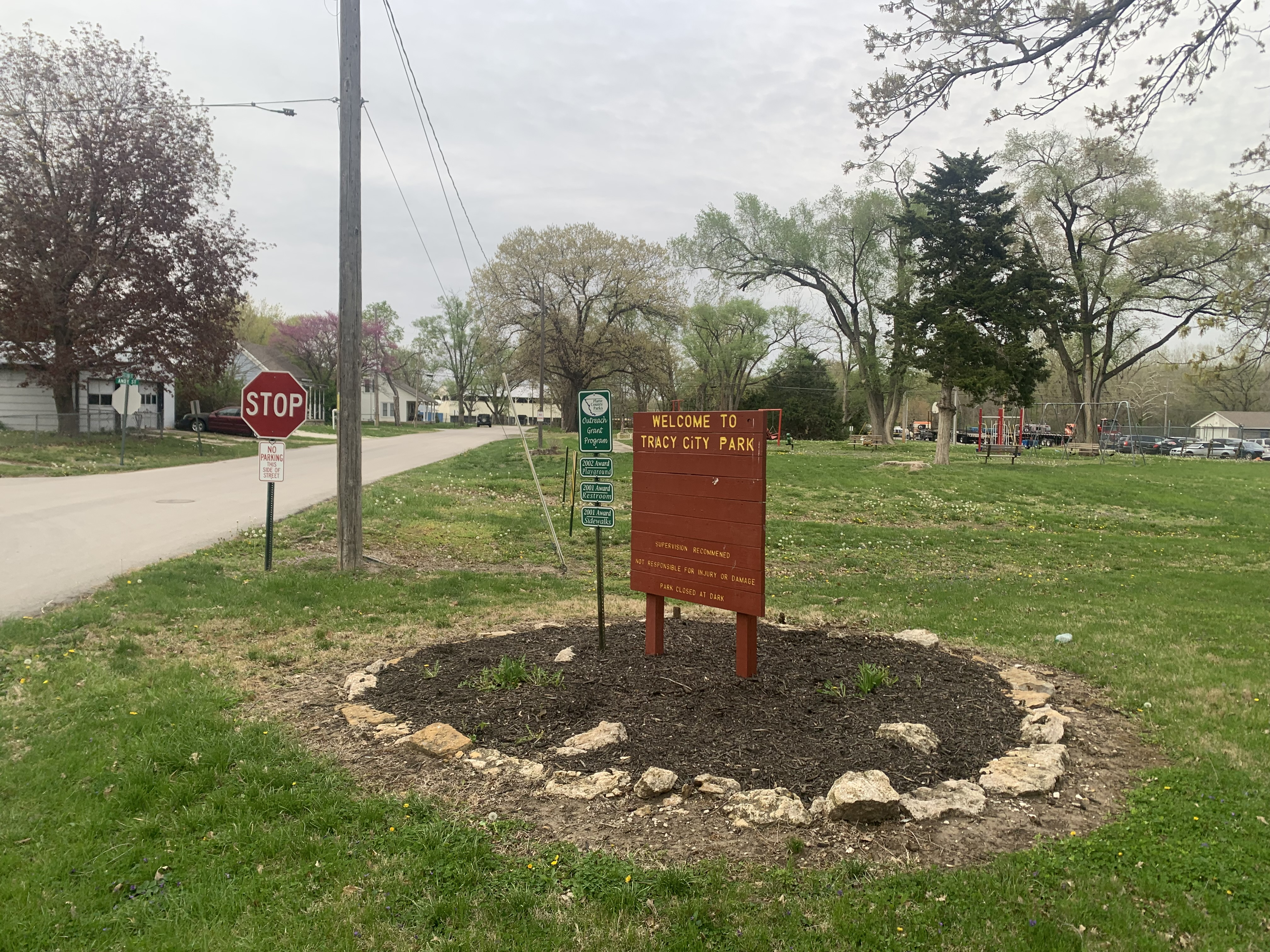
- Tracy City Park

- Location of Tracy, Missouri
- Coordinates: 39°22′31″N 94°47′29″W
- Country: United States
- State: Missouri
- County: Platte
- Township: Fair
- Incorporated: 1883

Area
  - Total: 0.42 sq mi (1.08 km^{2})
  - Land: 0.41 sq mi (1.06 km^{2})
  - Water: 0.0077 sq mi (0.02 km^{2})
- Elevation: 755 ft (230 m)

Population (2020)
  - Total: 269
  - Density: 656.2/sq mi (253.35/km^{2})
- Time zone: UTC-6 (Central (CST))
  - Summer (DST): UTC-5 (CDT)
- ZIP code: 64079
- Area code: 816
- FIPS code: 29-73690
- GNIS feature ID: 2397045
- Website: cityoftracymo.com

Tracy is a city along the Platte River in Platte County, Missouri, United States. The population was 269 at the 2020 census. The city is part of the Kansas City metropolitan area.

== History ==
Tracy was laid out in 1872, and named for J. W. Tracey, a superintendent of the Chicago, Rock Island and Pacific Railroad. A post office called Tracy has been in operation since 1882.

== Geography ==
Tracy is located on the northwest side of the Platte River directly across from Platte City. Missouri Route 92 serves the city and I-29 passes to the northeast.

According to the United States Census Bureau, the city has a total area of 0.42 square miles (1.09 km^{2}), of which 0.41 square miles (1.06 km^{2}) is land and 0.01 square miles (0.03 km^{2}) is water.

== Demographics ==
Historical population
Census	Pop.	Note	%±
1900	209		—
1910	176		−15.8%
1920	196		11.4%
1930	169		−13.8%
1940	230		36.1%
1950	201		−12.6%
1960	208		3.5%
1970	252		21.2%
1980	310		23.0%
1990	287		−7.4%
2000	213		−25.8%
2010	208		−2.3%
2020	269		29.3%
U.S. Decennial Census

=== 2010 census ===
As of the census of 2010, there were 208 people, 81 households, and 56 families living in the city. The population density was 507.3 inhabitants per square mile (195.9/km^{2}). There were 88 housing units at an average density of 214.6 per square mile (82.9/km^{2}). The racial makeup of the city was 98.6% White, 0.5% Asian, and 1.0% from two or more races. Hispanic or Latino of any race were 3.4% of the population.

There were 81 households, of which 30.9% had children under the age of 18 living with them, 56.8% were married couples living together, 8.6% had a female householder with no husband present, 3.7% had a male householder with no wife present, and 30.9% were non-families. 23.5% of all households were made up of individuals, and 4.9% had someone living alone who was 65 years of age or older. The average household size was 2.57 and the average family size was 3.13.

The median age in the city was 43 years. 25% of residents were under the age of 18; 3.4% were between the ages of 18 and 24; 24.5% were from 25 to 44; 34.7% were from 45 to 64; and 12.5% were 65 years of age or older. The gender makeup of the city was 49.0% male and 51.0% female.

=== 2000 census ===
As of the census of 2000, there were 213 people, 79 households, and 60 families living in the city. The population density was 987.4 inhabitants per square mile (381.2/km^{2}). There were 86 housing units at an average density of 398.7 per square mile (153.9/km^{2}). The racial makeup of the city was 97.18% White, 1.41% African American, and 1.41% from two or more races.

There were 79 households, out of which 34.2% had children under the age of 18 living with them, 67.1% were married couples living together, 7.6% had a female householder with no husband present, and 22.8% were non-families. 20.3% of all households were made up of individuals, and 7.6% had someone living alone who was 65 years of age or older. The average household size was 2.70 and the average family size was 3.07.

In the city the population was spread out, with 25.8% under the age of 18, 8.0% from 18 to 24, 29.1% from 25 to 44, 24.9% from 45 to 64, and 12.2% who were 65 years of age or older. The median age was 39 years. For every 100 females, there were 102.9 males. For every 100 females age 18 and over, there were 92.7 males.

The median income for a household in the city was $51,250, and the median income for a family was $54,375. Males had a median income of $33,750 versus $25,972 for females. The per capita income for the city was $21,082. About 11.5% of families and 9.0% of the population were below the poverty line, including 9.5% of those under the age of eighteen and none of those 65 or over.

== Education ==
It is in the Platte County R-III School District. The zoned elementary school and middle school are Compass Elementary School and Platte City Middle School. Platte County High School is the district's comprehensive high school.

== Notable person ==
- Murry Dickson, major league baseball pitcher

== See also ==
- List of cities in Missouri
