= Missouri Route 45 =

State highway in Missouri, U.S.

Route 45
- MO 45 in red, MO 45 Spur in blue

Route information
- Maintained by MoDOT
- Length: 36.920 mi (59.417 km)

Major junctions
- South end: I-29 / US 71 in Kansas City
- I-435 near Parkville
- North end: US 59 / Route 273 in Lewis & Clark Village

Location
- Country: United States
- State: Missouri

Highway system
- Missouri State Highway System; Interstate; US; State; Supplemental
← Route 44	→ Route 46

Route 45 is a highway in northwest Missouri, US in Buchanan County and Platte County which is largely in the bottom land alongside the Missouri River.

== Route description ==
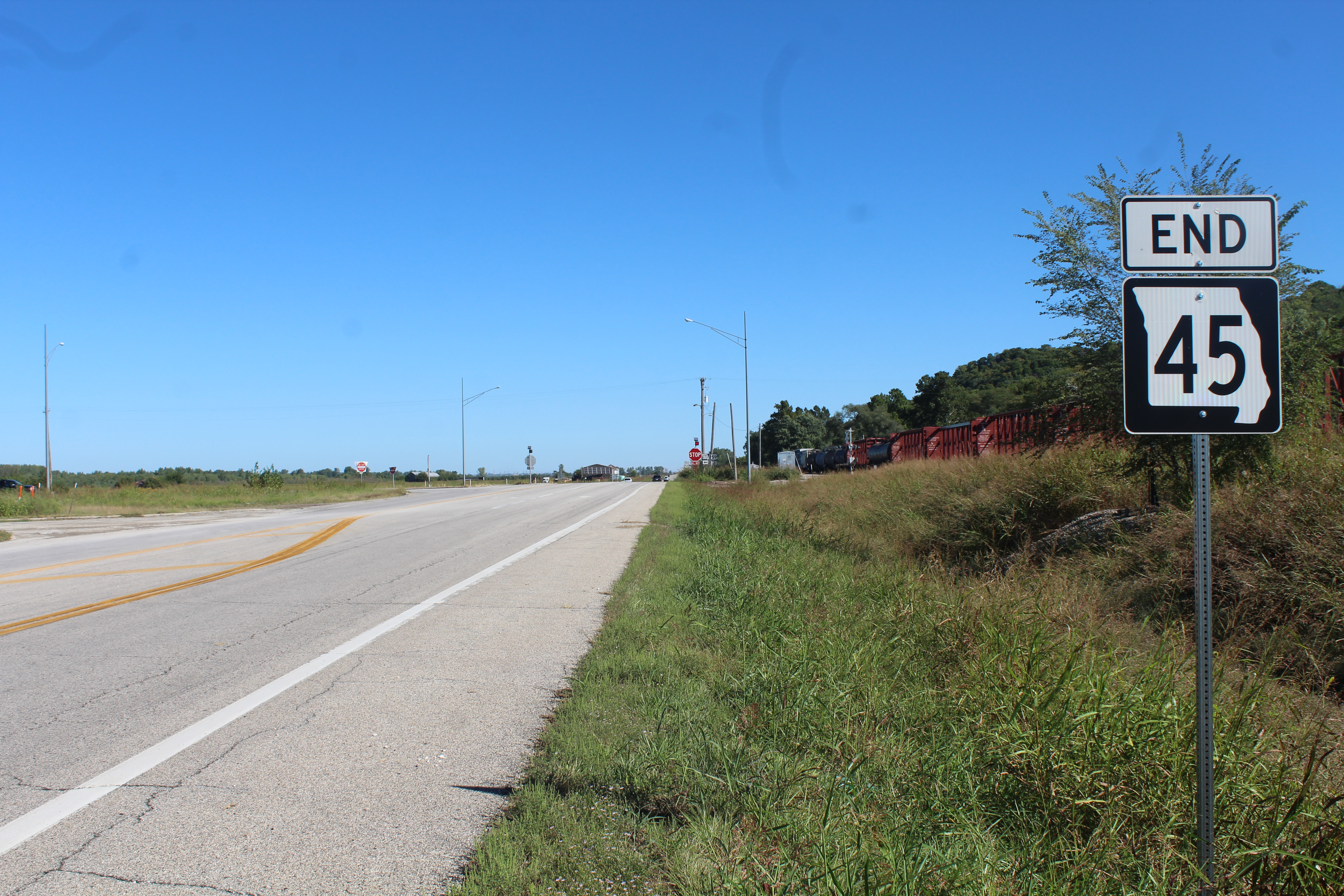
Northern terminus of route 45

Its northern terminus is U.S. Route 59 just east of Atchison, Kansas where 59 turns sharply to St. Joseph north while 45 heads south towards Kansas City.

It overlaps Route 273 until just south of Weston where 273 breaks off to head east.

At Beverly, Missouri, in what is referred to locally as the "Beverly Curve", it intersects Route 92 going east to Platte City and west to Leavenworth, Kansas.

About three miles (5 km) later at East Leavenworth, Missouri, Route 45 intersects its spur which goes northwest to Leavenworth. The spur, which is signed as "Route 45" and also known as the "Leavenworth cutoff", was built as a shortcut from Leavenworth, Kansas to Kansas City during the construction of the Centennial Bridge (Leavenworth, Kansas). Even though it is in Missouri it was maintained by the city of Leavenworth until the tolls were removed from the Centennial Bridge in May 1977. This is now maintained by MODOT.

South of Farley, the road leaves the Missouri River bottoms and heads southeast past Interstate 435. The section between Interstate 435 and Interstate 29 that passes the National Golf Club of Kansas City is named the Tom Watson Parkway after the Kansas City native champion golfer who also designed the club's course.

At the intersection with Interstate 435, the road widens to become a four-lane concrete avenue. The road's southern terminal point is Interstate 29.

The road, which is almost exclusively rural until entering Kansas City suburban development at I-435, is frequently listed as a "scenic route" as it stays close to the Missouri River bluffs and has commanding views of Fort Leavenworth.

== History ==
The length of the highway between the convergence of the spur and the intersection with I-435 to the south was quite narrow, each lane being less than 11 feet wide. In addition, there were large ruts just off the edges of the highway in some areas. This width shrank even more over the Platte River bridge just south of Farley, which was finally replaced after 79 years—the original bridge was built in 1933 and the replacement bridge (built just to the east of the old bridge) was completed in 2012. Recent construction in the spring months of 2013 has widened the road and eliminated the danger of ruts.

== Major intersections ==
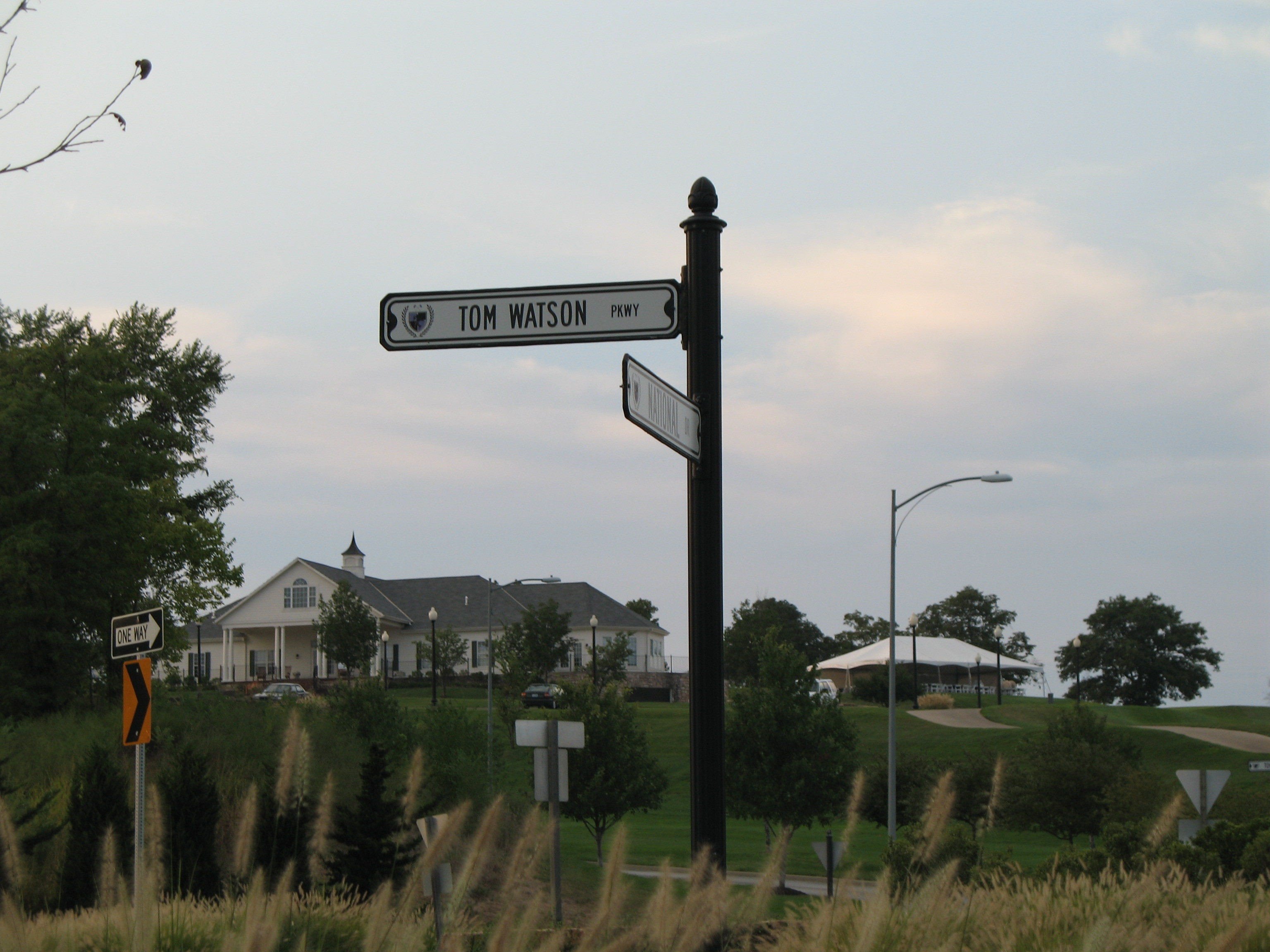
Tom Watson Parkway Sign and National Golf Club

County	Location	mi	km	Destinations	Notes
Platte	Kansas City	0.000– 0.077	0.000– 0.124	I-29 / US 71 – Kansas City, St. Joseph	Diamond interchange; exit 5
Platte	Parkville	2.288	3.682	Route 9 – Parkville, Platte Woods	
Platte	Kansas City	5.450– 5.500	8.771– 8.851	Route K (Hampton Road)	Roundabout; Southern terminus of Route K
Platte	Parkville	6.913– 7.044	11.125– 11.336	I-435 – Topeka, KS, St. Joseph	Diamond interchange; exit 22
Platte		15.961	25.687	Route 45 Spur – Leavenworth, KS	
Platte		19.327	31.104	Route 92 – Tracy, Leavenworth, KS	Connector
Platte		21.503	34.606	Route 273 / Route JJ – Weston, Tracy	Eastern terminus of Route JJ; Southern end of Route 273 concurrency
Platte	Weston	23.606	37.990	Route P	Western terminus of Route P
Platte	Weston	24.238	39.007	Route H – New Market	Southern terminus of Route H
Buchanan		35.870	57.727	Route 138 – Lewis and Clark Village	Eastern terminus of Route 138
Buchanan		36.920	59.417	US 59 / Route 273 – St. Joseph, Atchison, KS	Northern terminus; Northern end of Route 273 concurrency
1.000 mi = 1.609 km; 1.000 km = 0.621 mi: Concurrency terminus
