= Weston Bend State Park =

Protected land in Missouri, U.S.

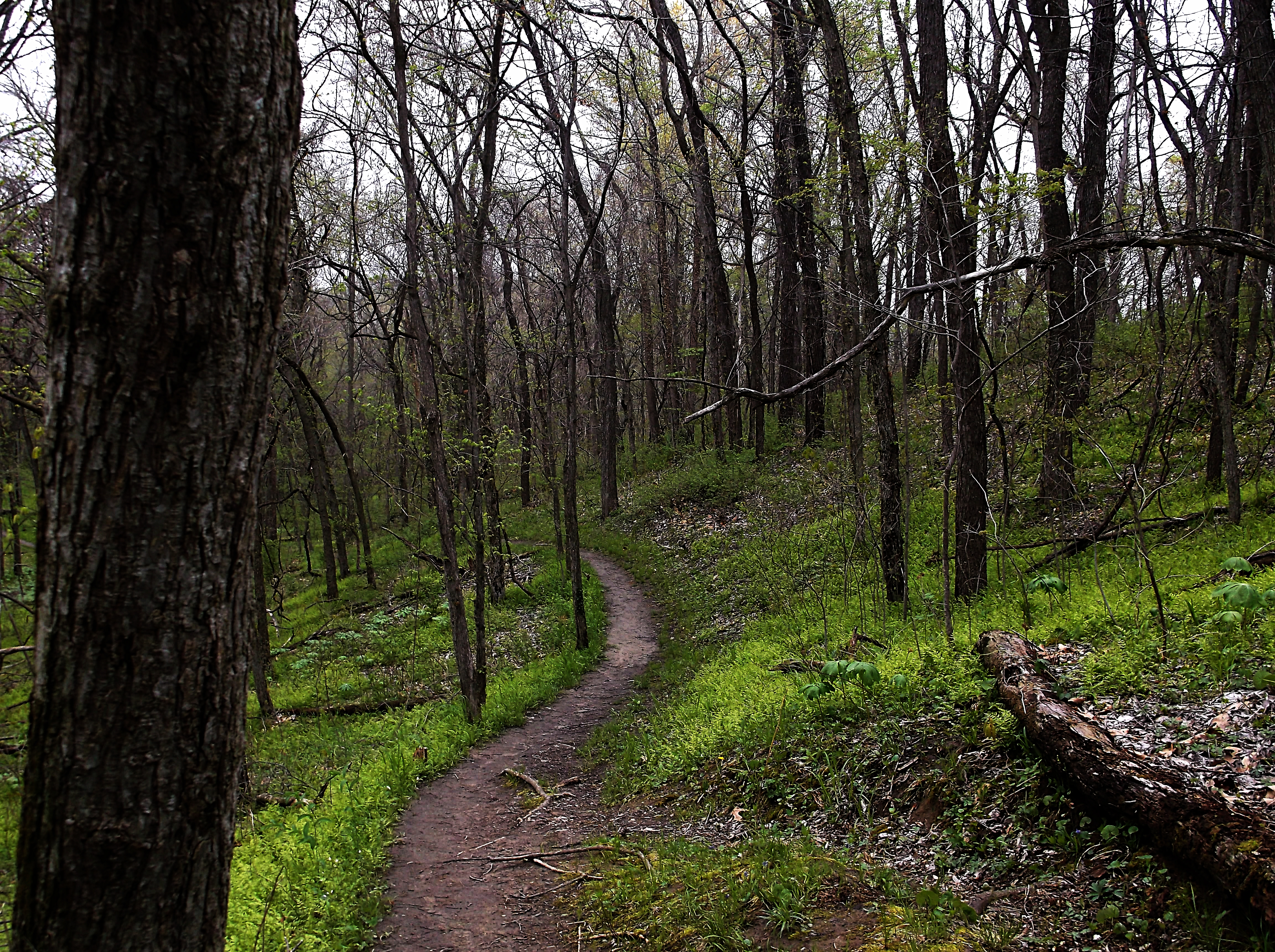

- Location within Missouri Location within the United States
- Location: Platte County, Missouri, United States
- Coordinates: 39°23′16″N 94°52′49″W
- Area: 1,133.08 acres (458.54 ha)
- Elevation: 1,004 ft (306 m)
- Established: 1980
- Administrator: Missouri Department of Natural Resources
- Visitors: 201,806 (in 2023)
- Website: Official website

Weston Bend State Park is a public recreation area on the east bank of the Missouri River in Platte County, Missouri. The state park's 1,133 acres (459 ha) include scenic river views, trails for hiking and biking, picnicking facilities, and a campground.

== History ==
Platte County once had a thriving tobacco industry, and at one time there were five tobacco barns within the park's boundary. One barn remains and has been converted to an enclosed shelter.

== Geography ==
The park is located on the far side of the Weston Bend of the Missouri River just southeast of Weston. Bee Creek and Bear Creek pass along the north and west side of the park, respectively. The topography of the entire park is hilly and forested.
