= Rushville, Missouri =

Village in Missouri, U.S.

- Village
- Rushville Christian Church

- Location of Rushville, Missouri

- Location within Missouri
- Coordinates: 39°35′15″N 95°1′26″W
- Country: United States
- State: Missouri
- County: Buchanan
- Township: Rush
- Incorporated: 1851

Area
  - Total: 0.20 sq mi (0.51 km^{2})
  - Land: 0.20 sq mi (0.51 km^{2})
  - Water: 0 sq mi (0.00 km^{2})
- Elevation: 869 ft (265 m)

Population (2020)
  - Total: 225
  - Density: 1,134.3/sq mi (437.97/km^{2})
- Time zone: UTC-6 (Central (CST))
  - Summer (DST): UTC-5 (CDT)
- ZIP code: 64484
- Area code: 816
- FIPS code: 29-63596
- GNIS feature ID: 2396893

Rushville is a village in western Buchanan County, Missouri, United States. The population was 225 at the 2020 census. It is part of the St. Joseph, MO–KS Metropolitan Statistical Area.

== History ==
Rushville was laid out in 1847. The village name was derived from the dense growth of rushes nearby.

== Geography ==
According to the United States Census Bureau, the village has a total area of 0.25 square miles (0.65 km^{2}), all land.

== Demographics ==
Historical population
Census	Pop.	Note	%±
1880	341		—
1890	375		10.0%
1900	412		9.9%
1910	566		37.4%
1920	262		−53.7%
1930	288		9.9%
1940	309		7.3%
1950	319		3.2%
1960	253		−20.7%
1970	300		18.6%
1980	271		−9.7%
1990	306		12.9%
2000	280		−8.5%
2010	303		8.2%
2020	225		−25.7%
U.S. Decennial Census

=== 2010 census ===
As of the census of 2010, there were 303 people, 112 households, and 81 families living in the village. The population density was 1,212.0 inhabitants per square mile (468.0/km^{2}). There were 127 housing units at an average density of 508.0 per square mile (196.1/km^{2}). The racial makeup of the village was 99.3% White and 0.7% from other races. Hispanic or Latino of any race were 0.7% of the population.

There were 112 households, of which 33.0% had children under the age of 18 living with them, 57.1% were married couples living together, 8.9% had a female householder with no husband present, 6.3% had a male householder with no wife present, and 27.7% were non-families. 21.4% of all households were made up of individuals, and 12.5% had someone living alone who was 65 years of age or older. The average household size was 2.71 and the average family size was 3.10.

The median age in the village was 37.8 years. 27.7% of residents were under the age of 18; 6.7% were between the ages of 18 and 24; 24.3% were from 25 to 44; 26.7% were from 45 to 64; and 14.5% were 65 years of age or older. The gender makeup of the village was 50.2% male and 49.8% female.

=== 2000 census ===
As of the census of 2000, there were 280 people, 113 households, and 78 families living in the town. The population density was 1,236.4 inhabitants per square mile (477.4/km^{2}). There were 121 housing units at an average density of 534.3 per square mile (206.3/km^{2}). The racial makeup of the town was 99.29% White, 0.36% Pacific Islander, and 0.36% from two or more races.

There were 113 households, out of which 34.5% had children under the age of 18 living with them, 54.0% were married couples living together, 7.1% had a female householder with no husband present, and 30.1% were non-families. 25.7% of all households were made up of individuals, and 12.4% had someone living alone who was 65 years of age or older. The average household size was 2.48 and the average family size was 2.99.

In the town the population was spread out, with 27.5% under the age of 18, 9.3% from 18 to 24, 27.5% from 25 to 44, 20.7% from 45 to 64, and 15.0% who were 65 years of age or older. The median age was 36 years. For every 100 females, there were 87.9 males. For every 100 females age 18 and over, there were 93.3 males.

The median income for a household in the town was $31,875, and the median income for a family was $36,071. Males had a median income of $26,563 versus $18,839 for females. The per capita income for the town was $15,147. About 8.0% of families and 11.2% of the population were below the poverty line, including 16.1% of those under the age of eighteen and 4.4% of those 65 or over.

== Education ==
The school district is Buchanan County R-IV School District.

== See also ==
- List of cities in Missouri
