= Iatan, Missouri =

- Village
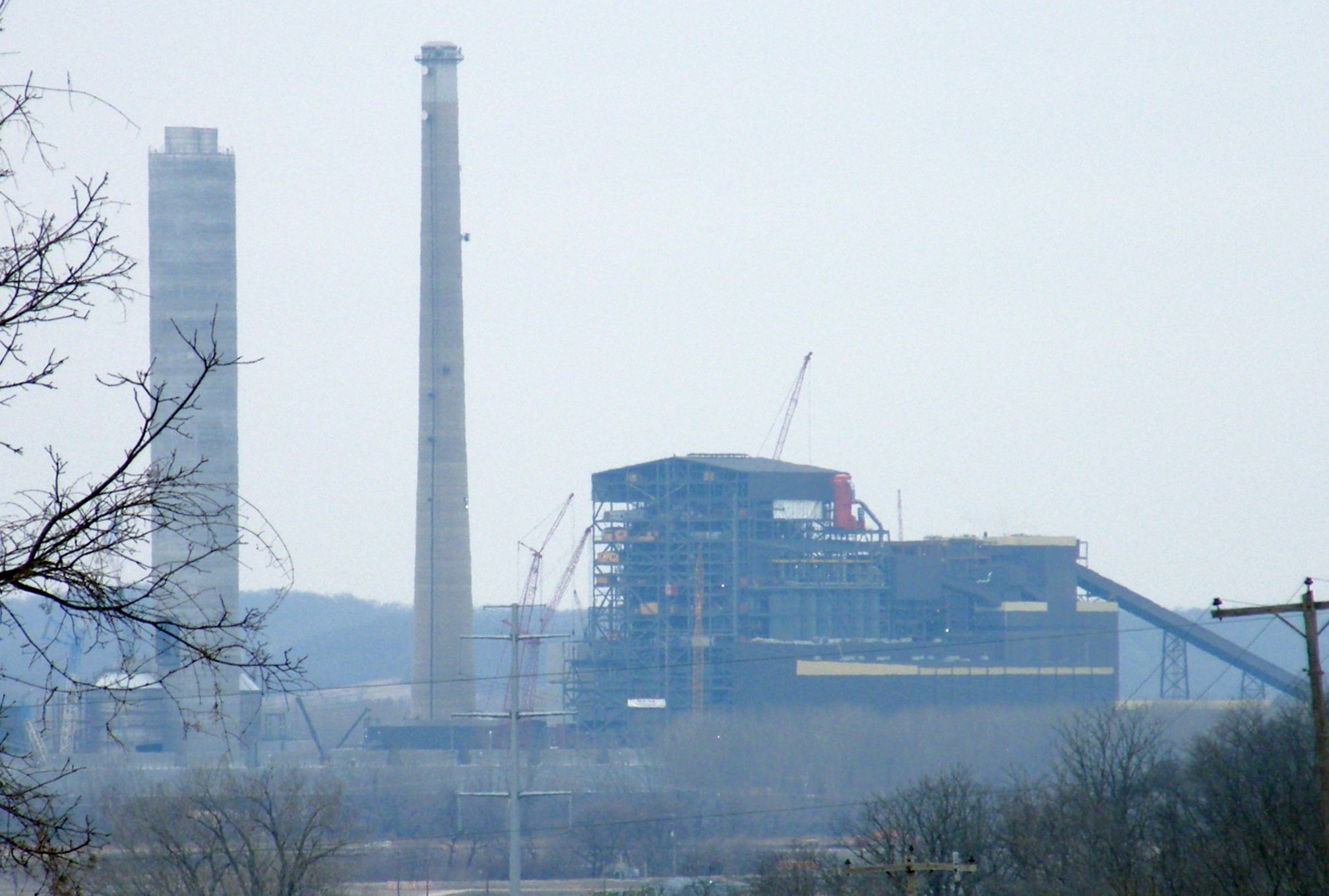
- Iatan Power Plant

- Location of Iatan, Missouri
- Coordinates: 39°28′45″N 94°59′05″W
- Country: United States
- State: Missouri
- County: Platte
- Township: Marshall

Area
  - Total: 0.22 sq mi (0.56 km^{2})
  - Land: 0.22 sq mi (0.56 km^{2})
  - Water: 0 sq mi (0.00 km^{2})
- Elevation: 922 ft (281 m)

Population (2020)
  - Total: 39
  - Density: 179/sq mi (69.1/km^{2})
- Time zone: UTC-6 (Central (CST))
  - Summer (DST): UTC-5 (CDT)
- FIPS code: 29-34210
- GNIS feature ID: 2398567

Iatan is a village in Platte County, Missouri within the United States. The population was 39 at the 2020 census. It is within the Kansas City metropolitan area.

== History ==
The community is said to derive its name from Iatan, a chief of the Otoe tribe who supposedly derived his name from battles with the Comanche who were sometimes also referred to as Iatan; a variant spelling was Iotan. The town site was platted in 1842. A post office called Iatan was established in 1855, and remained in operation until 1964.

Iatan, first settled by John Dougherty in 1837, was one of the first communities to be established after the Platte Purchase allowed white settlement on former Native American land (which was proclaimed in February 1837). It was initially an important trading port on the Missouri River but was soon overtaken by Weston, Missouri five miles (8 km) to the south and St. Joseph, Missouri 20 miles (32 km) to the north.

== Iatan power plants ==
The community's name is applied to the Iatan 1 and Iatan 2 coal-fired power stations for Kansas City Power & Light which is the largest coal-fired generating plant in Missouri.

The Iatan 1 plant which opened in 1980 has a 651-megawatt capacity and had a 700-foot (210 m) high chimney when it opened. The tower is higher than any occupied building in the state including the Gateway Arch.

The Iatan 2 plant opened in 2010 and can generate 850 Megawatts with a capacity to burn 494 tons of coal per hour. The new plant has a lower 60-foot (18 m) high mechanical cooling tower.

== Geography ==
According to the United States Census Bureau, the village has a total area of 0.12 square miles (0.31 km^{2}), all land.

== Demographics ==
Historical population
Census	Pop.	Note	%±
1870	129		—
1880	117		−9.3%
1970	75		—
1980	64		−14.7%
1990	47		−26.6%
2000	54		14.9%
2010	45		−16.7%
2020	39		−13.3%
U.S. Decennial Census

=== 2010 census ===
As of the census of 2010, there were 45 people, 18 households, and 11 families residing in the village. The population density was 375.0 inhabitants per square mile (144.8/km^{2}). There were 22 housing units at an average density of 183.3 per square mile (70.8/km^{2}). The racial makeup of the village was 91.1% White, 6.7% African American, and 2.2% from two or more races.

There were 18 households, of which 27.8% had children under the age of 18 living with them, 44.4% were married couples living together, 11.1% had a female householder with no husband present, 5.6% had a male householder with no wife present, and 38.9% were non-families. 27.8% of all households were made up of individuals, and 16.7% had someone living alone who was 65 years of age or older. The average household size was 2.50 and the average family size was 3.18.

The median age in the village was 35.8 years. 26.7% of residents were under the age of 18; 6.6% were between the ages of 18 and 24; 26.7% were from 25 to 44; 28.8% were from 45 to 64; and 11.1% were 65 years of age or older. The gender makeup of the village was 55.6% male and 44.4% female.

=== 2000 census ===
As of the census of 2000, there were 54 people, 22 households, and 13 families residing in the village. The population density was 1,399.0 inhabitants per square mile (540.2/km^{2}). There were 24 housing units at an average density of 621.8 per square mile (240.1/km^{2}). The racial makeup of the village was 100.00% White.

There were 22 households, out of which 31.8% had children under the age of 18 living with them, 40.9% were married couples living together, 13.6% had a female householder with no husband present, and 40.9% were non-families. 31.8% of all households were made up of individuals, and 4.5% had someone living alone who was 65 years of age or older. The average household size was 2.45 and the average family size was 3.31.

In the village, the population was spread out, with 24.1% under the age of 18, 7.4% from 18 to 24, 27.8% from 25 to 44, 31.5% from 45 to 64, and 9.3% who were 65 years of age or older. The median age was 40 years. For every 100 females, there were 100.0 males. For every 100 females age 18 and over, there were 105.0 males.

The median income for a household in the village was $35,625, and the median income for a family was $36,250. Males had a median income of $22,188 versus $10,625 for females. The per capita income for the village was $8,895. There were 25.0% of families and 16.4% of the population living below the poverty line, including 15.6% of under eighteens and none of those over 64.

== Education ==
It is in the West Platte County R-II School District.

== Revival Efforts ==
Residents of Iatan are actively working to revive their historic village, which has faced numerous challenges over the years. The village has experienced significant decline, including the loss of its post office in 1964 and a devastating fire in 1923 that destroyed much of the town.

The current board of trustees, led by Chairman Dan Schultz and Crystal Weaver, is focused on preserving Iatan's heritage and improving infrastructure. One of their primary concerns is the deteriorating Mission Creek bridge, built in 1885, which is too narrow for emergency vehicles and has been damaged by flooding. Additionally, the village hall, located in an old mobile home, lacks basic amenities such as running water and heat, and its roof is leaking.

Iatan residents have initiated fundraising efforts, including a GoFundMe campaign, to support the restoration of the bridge and the establishment of a communal gathering space.
