= Lewis and Clark State Park (Missouri) =

State park in Missouri, United States

- Location within Missouri Location within the United States
- Location: Buchanan County, Missouri, United States
- Coordinates: 39°32′16″N 95°03′31″W
- Area: 189.13 acres (76.54 ha)
- Elevation: 781 ft (238 m)
- Established: 1934
- Administrator: Missouri Department of Natural Resources
- Visitors: 69,038 (in 2023)
- Website: Official website
- Sugar Lake State Park Open Shelter
- U.S. National Register of Historic Places
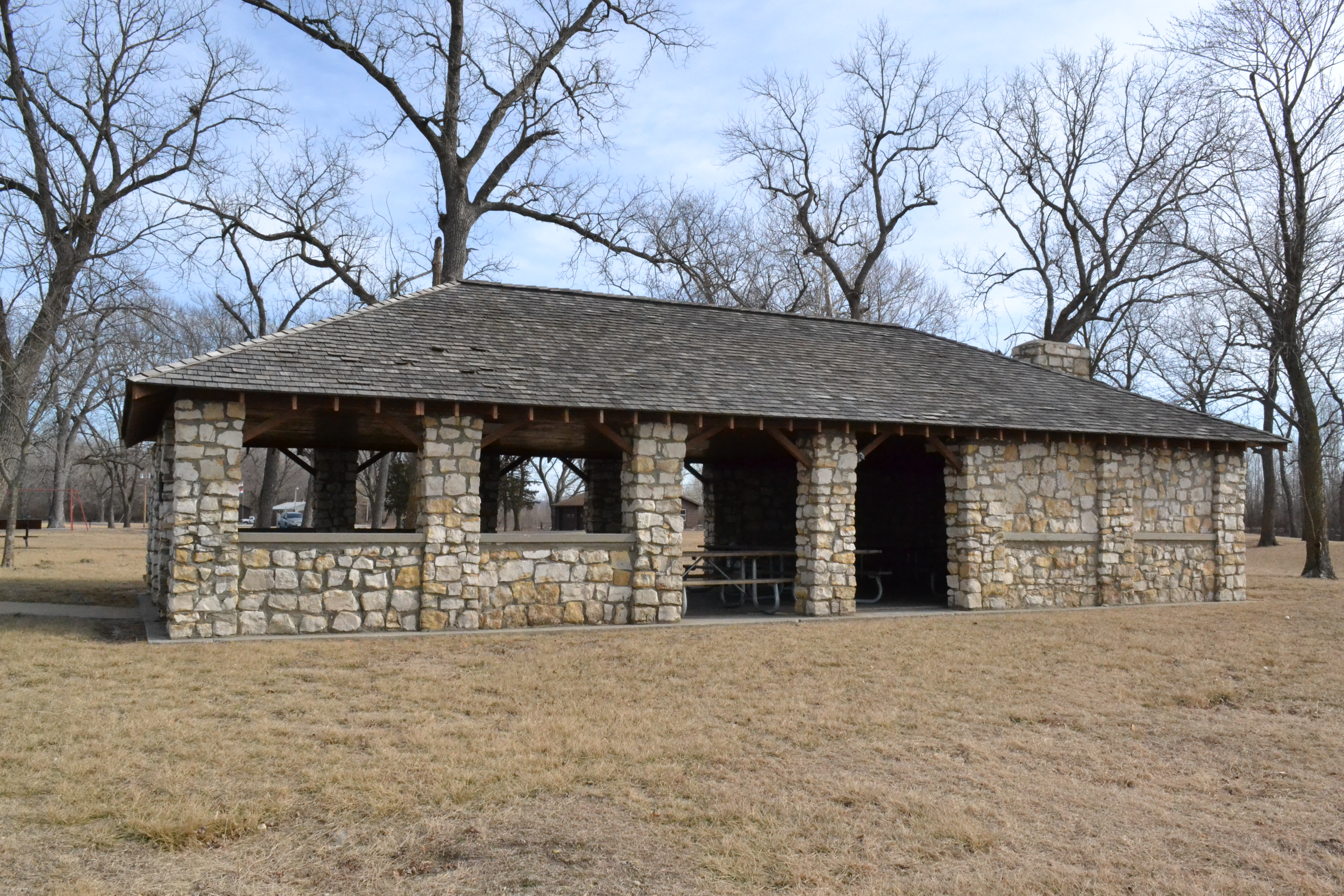
- Nearest city: Rushville, Missouri
- Area: Less than one acre
- Built: 1934
- Built by: Civilian Conservation Corps
- Architectural style: Rustic
- MPS: ECW Architecture in Missouri State Parks 1933-1942 TR
- NRHP reference No.: 85000522
- Added to NRHP: February 28, 1985

Lewis and Clark State Park is a public recreation area occupying 189 acres (76 ha) on the south shore of 365-acre (148 ha) Lewis and Clark Lake (a.k.a. Sugar Lake) in Buchanan County, Missouri. The state park features camping, picnicking, and fishing.

== History ==
In the late 19th-Century, meat packers of Kansas City and St. Joseph harvested ice from this lake.

The tract was acquired in 1934 as the gift of a group of Buchanan County sportsmen and was originally named Sugar Lake State Park. The name was changed in 1938 to honor Lewis and Clark, who are believed to have discovered the lake, naming it Gosling Lake, on their expedition in 1804-1806.

The Sugar Lake State Park Open Shelter was built in 1934 by a Civilian Conservation Corps company who encamped briefly at the park. It is a stone picnic shelter on a poured concrete foundation. The shelter was listed on the National Register of Historic Places in 1985.
