= Lewis and Clark Village, Missouri =

Village in Buchanan County, Missouri, United States

- Village
- View of Lewis and Clark Village

- Location of Lewis and Clark Village, Missouri

- Location within Missouri Location within the United States
- Coordinates: 39°32′16″N 95°03′02″W
- Country: United States
- State: Missouri
- County: Buchanan
- Township: Rush

Area
  - Total: 0.70 sq mi (1.82 km^{2})
  - Land: 0.61 sq mi (1.58 km^{2})
  - Water: 0.089 sq mi (0.23 km^{2})
- Elevation: 784 ft (239 m)

Population (2020)
  - Total: 96
  - Density: 156.9/sq mi (60.59/km^{2})
- Time zone: UTC-6 (Central (CST))
  - Summer (DST): UTC-5 (CDT)
- FIPS code: 29-41834
- GNIS feature ID: 2396714

Lewis and Clark Village is a village in Buchanan County, Missouri, United States. The population was 96 at the 2020 census. It is part of the St. Joseph, MO–KS Metropolitan Statistical Area.

== Geography ==
According to the United States Census Bureau, the village has a total area of 0.71 square miles (1.84 km^{2}), of which 0.62 square miles (1.61 km^{2}) is land and 0.09 square miles (0.23 km^{2}) is water.

== Demographics ==
Historical population
Census	Pop.	Note	%±
1980	131		—
1990	142		8.4%
2000	155		9.2%
2010	132		−14.8%
2020	96		−27.3%
U.S. Decennial Census

=== 2010 census ===
As of the census of 2010, there were 132 people, 53 households, and 38 families residing in the village. The population density was 212.9 inhabitants per square mile (82.2/km^{2}). There were 63 housing units at an average density of 101.6 per square mile (39.2/km^{2}). The racial makeup of the village was 100.0% White.

There were 53 households, of which 24.5% had children under the age of 18 living with them, 60.4% were married couples living together, 3.8% had a female householder with no husband present, 7.5% had a male householder with no wife present, and 28.3% were non-families. 26.4% of all households were made up of individuals, and 9.4% had someone living alone who was 65 years of age or older. The average household size was 2.49 and the average family size was 3.03.

The median age in the village was 43 years. 22.7% of residents were under the age of 18; 6.8% were between the ages of 18 and 24; 23.6% were from 25 to 44; 34.1% were from 45 to 64; and 12.9% were 65 years of age or older. The gender makeup of the village was 46.2% male and 53.8% female.

=== 2000 census ===
As of the census of 2000, there were 155 people, 66 households, and 39 families residing in the town. The population density was 257.9 inhabitants per square mile (99.6/km^{2}). There were 78 housing units at an average density of 129.8 per square mile (50.1/km^{2}). The racial makeup of the town was 99.35% White, and 0.65% from two or more races.

There were 66 households, out of which 30.3% had children under the age of 18 living with them, 53.0% were married couples living together, 3.0% had a female householder with no husband present, and 40.9% were non-families. 34.8% of all households were made up of individuals, and 16.7% had someone living alone who was 65 years of age or older. The average household size was 2.35 and the average family size was 3.08.

In the town the population was spread out, with 24.5% under the age of 18, 7.1% from 18 to 24, 28.4% from 25 to 44, 26.5% from 45 to 64, and 13.5% who were 65 years of age or older. The median age was 39 years. For every 100 females, there were 101.3 males. For every 100 females age 18 and over, there were 105.3 males.

The median income for a household in the town was $42,000, and the median income for a family was $50,000. Males had a median income of $31,071 versus $22,000 for females. The per capita income for the town was $19,050. About 10.0% of families and 10.6% of the population were below the poverty line, including none of those under the age of eighteen and 9.1% of those 65 or over.

== Education ==
The school district is Buchanan County R-IV School District.

== See also ==
- List of cities in Missouri
