= Kansas City Interscholastic Conference =

High school athletic conference in Kansas City, Missouri, United States

- Association: MSHSAA
- No. of teams: 8
- Region: Kansas City metropolitan area

The Kansas City Interscholastic (KCI) Conference is a mid-sized school athletic conference in the state of Missouri. It contains eight schools and holds many recent state titles in football, basketball and other sports. The schools in the KCI are classified as Missouri Class 2 and Missouri Class 3 by the Missouri State High School Activities Association.

== Member schools ==
School	Nickname	Colors	City	County	Type	9–12 Enrollment (2024)	Primary MSHSAA Classification
East Buchanan	Bulldogs		Gower	Clinton	Public	254	Class 3
Lathrop	Mules		Lathrop	Clinton	Public	307	Class 3
Lawson	Cardinals		Lawson	Ray	Public	283	Class 3
Mid Buchanan	Dragons		Faucett	Buchanan	Public	204	Class 2
North Platte	Panthers		Dearborn	Platte	Public	159	Class 2
Penney	Hornets		Hamilton	Caldwell	Public	192	Class 2
Plattsburg	Tigers		Plattsburg	Clinton	Public	141	Class 2
West Platte	Bluejays		Weston	Platte	Public	170	Class 2

The KCI has 3 former member schools those being the Platte County Pirates,Cameron Dragons, and the Smithville Warriors. They all left in the 90’s for larger class 3 and class 5 conferences. In 2011, Penney joined the KCI from the GRC.

== State championships ==
=== Football ===
- Plattsburg 1979
- North Platte 1998
- West Platte 2001
- West Platte 2005
- Lawson 2007
- Penney 2009*
- Penney 2010*
- Penney 2012
- Penney 2016
- East Buchanan 2021, 2022
- * won state title as member of Grand River Conference.

=== Softball ===
- Mid-Buchanan 1980
- Lathrop 2015

=== Boys basketball ===
- Lathrop 1985

=== Girls basketball ===
- Penney 1977
- Penney 2008
- East Buchanan 2020

=== Boys track and field ===
- East Buchanan 1974
- East Buchanan 2005
- East Buchanan 2023

=== Girls track and field ===
*won as member of Grand River Conference

- Penney 2007*
- Penney 2008*
- Penney 2009*
- Penney 2010*
- Penney 2011
- North Platte 2022
- North Platte 2023
- North Platte 2024

=== Wrestling ===
- Mid-Buchanan 2021
