= Mid Buchanan High School =

Coordinates: 39°37′58″N 94°48′48″W

Mid-Buchanan High School
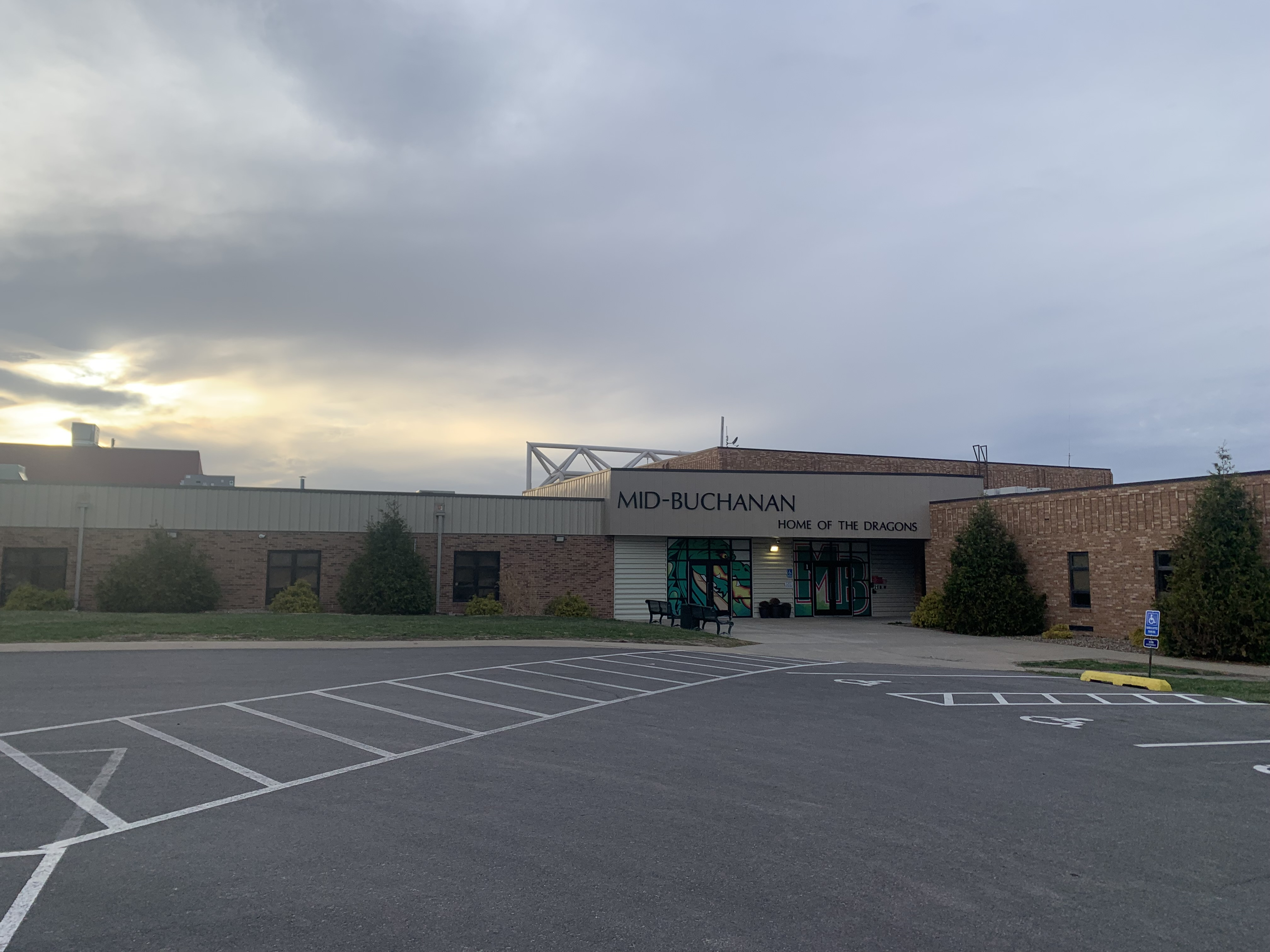

Location
- 3221 SE State Route H Faucett, Buchanan County, Missouri 64448; USA

Information
- Type: Comprehensive Public High School
- School district: Mid-Buchanan R-V
- Principal: Chantelle Schwope
- Teaching staff: 29.85 (FTE)
- Grades: 7–12
- Enrollment: 398 (2023–2024)
- Average class size: 20
- Student to teacher ratio: 13.33
- Campus type: Suburban
- Colors: Kelly Green, Red, White
- Athletics conference: KCI Conference
- Mascot: Duke the Dragon
- Nickname: Dragons
- Website: www.midbuchanan.k12.mo.us

Mid Buchanan High School is a public high school in Faucett, Missouri. Mid Buchanan competes in the Missouri State High School Activities Association as a member of the Kansas City Interscholastic Conference in several interscholastic sports. Enrollment at Mid Buchanan High School is approximately 250 students.

== Demographics ==
Category	Stats
District Population	4290
Gender:	51% Male, 49% Female
Cultural background:	96.8% White, 0.9% African-American, 2.3% Other

== Athletics ==
Mid Buchanan competes in the Kansas City Interscholastic Conference in many boys and girls activities ranging from Missouri Class 2 to Missouri Class 3. For boys, the Dragons compete in football, basketball, wrestling, baseball, cross country and track and field. Girls teams compete in volleyball, softball, soccer, cross country, cheerleading, track and field, and dance team. The West Platte Bluejays and cross-county foe the East Buchanan Bulldogs are two rivals of the Mid-Buchanan Dragons.

The Dragons were state champions in softball in 1980, defeating New Haven High School by a score of 13–2 in Columbia, Missouri. The Dragons have had numerous other top four state finishes, including:

- 1980 Softball, State Champions
- 1999 Softball, 4th Place
- 2003 Cheerleading, State Champions
- 2008 Softball, 3rd Place
- 2009 Golf, 3rd Place
- 2012 Wrestling, 4th Place
- 2015 Boys Basketball, 2nd Place
- 2018 Boys Basketball, 3rd Place
- 2018 Girls Basketball, 2nd Place
- 2018 Girls Track & Field, 4th Place
- 2019 Girls Basketball, 2nd Place
- 2020 Football, 2nd Place
- 2021 Wrestling, State Champions

=== Softball ===
The Mid Buchanan softball team has made many playoff appearances, resulting in three top-four finishes in the state of Missouri. Mid Buchanan's 16 state playoff appearances rank 6th all-time among Missouri high schools. In 1980, Mid Buchanan defeated New Haven High School by a score of 13–2 to claim the state title in Columbia, Missouri. The 1999 Mid Buchanan softball team finished 4th in state after falling to Kelly High School in the third place game held in Columbia. The softball team reached the final four once again in 2008 when they defeated Marion C. Early High School to claim third place in St. Joseph, Missouri.

=== Boys basketball ===
Mid-Buchanan is home to one of Missouri's winningest boys basketball programs in the past few decades. Since 2000, Mid-Buchanan has posted nine 20-win seasons and failed to reach 15 wins in a season only twice (totaling 375 wins since the turn of the century). The 2006/2007 basketball team completed a perfect 25–0 regular season, garnering the number 2 ranking in the state of Missouri, before an upset in the district championship at the hands of West Platte ended their season at 27–1; Mid-Buchanan had beaten the same West Platte team 70–40 exactly two weeks prior to the defeat in the district title game.

- District Titles (8): 1986, 2010, 2011, 2015, 2017, 2018, 2019, 2020
- KCI Conference Titles (8): 2001, 2007, 2009, 2010, 2014, 2015, 2018, 2020

Mid-Buchanan has claimed 8 district titles, the first coming in 1986 after a victory over Osborn High School. This team would lose the following game in the sectional round to end their season.

After a somewhat long drought which saw many good teams fail to reach the playoffs, Mid-Buchanan returned once again with a district championship in 2010. In a district that paired the No. 1 team in the state, Penney High School, with the No. 2 ranked team in the state, Mid-Buchanan High School, the Dragons prevailed 70–67 to claim the crown. The following playoff game featured a matchup with Wellington-Napoleon High School, where Mid-Buchanan blew a 9-point 4th quarter lead and failed to win the first playoff game in school history. The 2009/2010 squad finished the season with a record 27–2, ranked No. 6 in the state of Missouri.

The following season, the 2010/2011 Mid-Buchanan basketball once again won the district title, this time in class 3. Matched against the No. 1 ranked team in the state, Cameron High School, Mid-Buchanan paced to a 50–38 win. The sectional game provided a rematch of the previous year's district title game with Penney High School, this time ranking as No. 2 in the state. Penney claimed a 9-point victory, ending the Dragons season at 24–4 with a final class 3 state ranking of No. 9.

The 2014/2015 Mid-Buchanan boys basketball team made a run at school history by finishing 2nd place in the state of Missouri for class 2. The run began with a district title over conference rival Penney High School before seeing a miraculous comeback in the state sectional playoff game to defeat Wellington-Napoleon. The following game had the Dragons defeat the defending state champion Sedalia Sacred Heart in the state quarterfinals, which provided a berth to the state final four. Mid-Buchanan then went on to defeat Canton in the semifinal matchup before falling to state powerhouse Scott County Central High School (alma mater of Otto Porter) in the state title game by a score of 48–53.

=== Football ===
Mid-Buchanan football has made four playoff appearances in school history.

The first playoff appearance came in 2003, as Mid-Buchanan defeated West Platte 9–7 in dramatic fashion to claim the district title. The team went on to shut out and dominate Rock Port High School 34–0 in the sectional matchup before bowing out to eventual state runner-up and then-undefeated Princeton High School by a score of 33–21. This was the first time in school history the Dragons had made the playoffs, advancing to the quarterfinal round.

The second playoff appearance came in 2009, under the new playoff format. The 2009 Dragons finished the regular season at 6–4, setting up a regional playoff matchup against King City High School. Mid-Buchanan avenged a loss earlier in the season and defeated the Wildkats 24–12, advancing them to the state sectionals for yet another rematch, this time with North Platte High School. In a grueling matchup, Mid-Buchanan prevailed with a 14–10 win, placing them in the quarterfinals with future conference foe Penney High School. A loss to eventual state champion Penney High School ended Mid-Buchanan's season with an 8–5 record, tying the 2003 squad for the most wins in school history.

The 2018 and 2019 Mid-Buchanan football teams both made state title runs, falling in the state semifinals each season.

=== Golf ===
Golf was introduced as a sport at Mid-Buchanan following schoolboard approval for the 2006/2007 season. In a matter of years, the golf team became a regular top 10 team in the state of Missouri. In 2009, Mid-Buchanan's golf team placed 3rd in the state of Missouri for their highest state finish. Other top-10 finishes include a 7th-place finish in 2010, 9th in 2012 and 7th in 2014.
