= North Platte High School =

North Platte High School may refer to:

- North Platte High School (Missouri), Dearborn, Missouri, US
- North Platte High School (Nebraska), North Platte, Nebraska, US
