= Ivan Schottel =

American football player and coach (1921–2000)

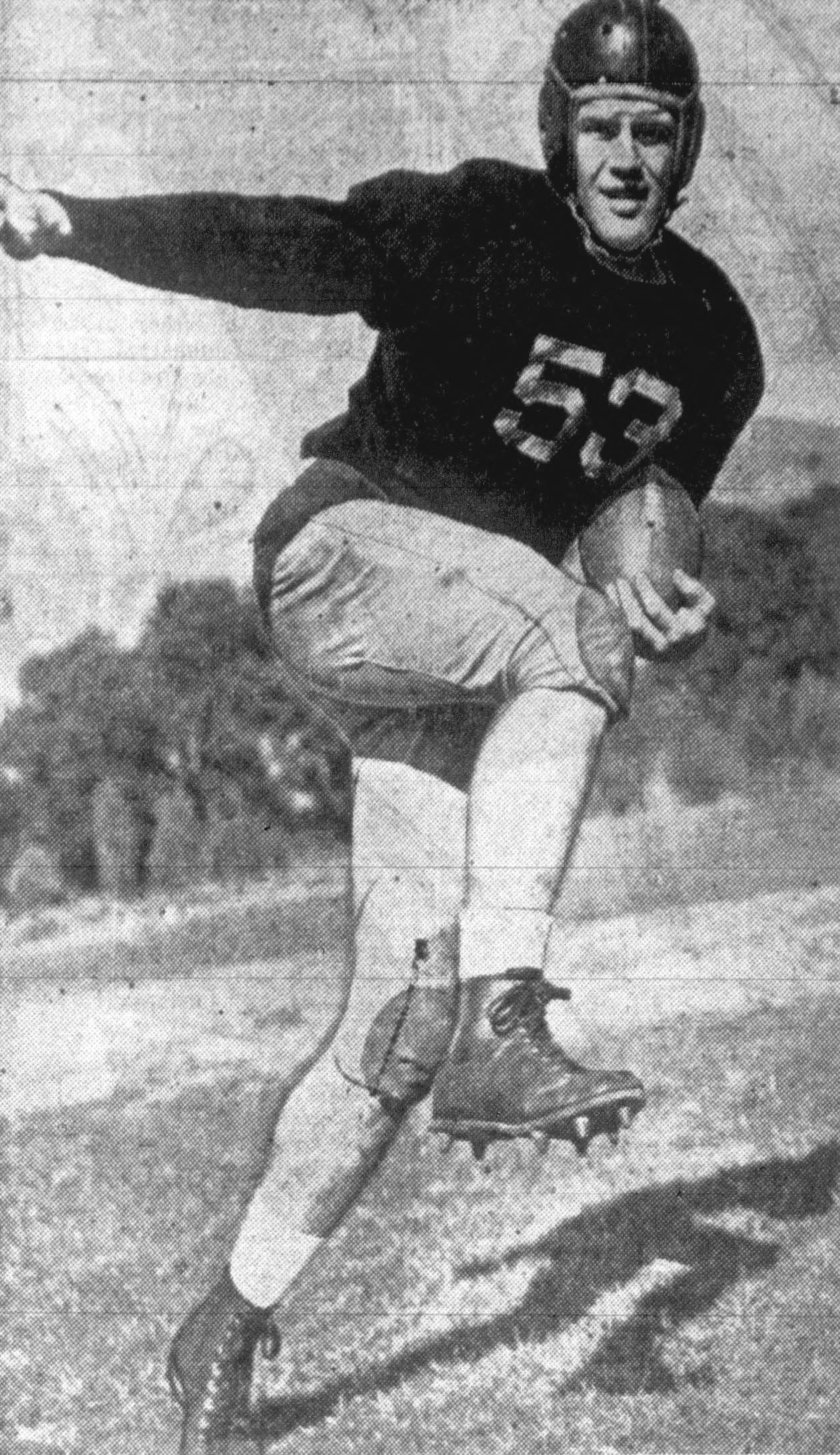
- Schottel, c. 1942

Biographical details
- Born: October 11, 1921; Cosby, Missouri, U.S.
- Died: August 21, 2000 (aged 78); St. Joseph, Missouri, U.S.

Playing career
- early 1940s: Maryville (MO)
- 1946: Detroit Lions
- 1948: Detroit Lions
- Positions: End, defensive back

Coaching career (HC unless noted)
- 1949–1952: Atchison HS (KS)
- 1953–1962: St. Benedict's
- 1963–1970: Northwest Missouri State
- 1971–1973: Butler County
- 1974–1975: North Platte HS (MO)

Head coaching record
- Overall: 80–80–3 (college); 7–23–2 (junior college)
- Bowls: 1–0 (college)
- Tournaments: 0–1 (NAIA playoffs)

Accomplishments and honors

Championships
- 5 CIC (1953, 1956, 1958–1960)

Ivan Estill Schottel (October 11, 1921 – August 21, 2000) was an American football player and coach. He played professionally as an end and defensive back with the Detroit Lions of the National Football League (NFL) in 1946 and 1948. Schottel served as the head football at St. Benedict's College—now known as Benedictine College—in Atchison, Kansas from 1953 to 1962 and Northwest Missouri State College—now known as Northwest Missouri State University—in Maryville, Missouri, compiling a career college football coaching record of 80–80–3.

== Early life and playing career ==
Schottel was born in Cosby, Missouri and graduated from King City High School in King City, Missouri. He attended Northwest Missouri State Teacher's College—now known as Northwest Missouri State University—in Maryville, Missouri, playing for the school's football, basketball, and track and field teams. Schottel then attended pre-flight training at Saint Mary College in Leavenworth, Kansas, where he played for the service team. He joined United States Army during World War II. After the war, Schottel played for professionally for the Detroit Lions of the National Football League (NFL) as an end and defensive back in 1946 and 1948. He appeared in 16 games for the Lions, had four receptions for 147 yards, and scored touchdown. He had a 41.6 yard punting average. An injury in 1948 ended his career.

== Coaching career ==
=== Benedictine ===
Schottel was the tenth head football coach at St. Benedict's College—now known as Benedictine College—in Atchison, Kansas, serving for 10 seasons, from 1953 to 1962, compiling a record of 52–36–2.

=== Northwest Missouri State ===
Schottel was the 12th head football coach at Northwest Missouri State College—now known as Northwest Missouri State University—in Maryville, Missouri, serving for eight seasons, from 1963 to 1970, compiling a record of 28–44–1.

=== Later coaching career ===
In 1971, Schottel was hired as the head football coach at Butler County Junior College—now known as Butler Community College—in El Dorado, Kansas, succeeding Merle Nay. In 1974, he resigned as head football coach and athletic director at Butler County to coach football and track and teach physical education at North Platte High School in Dearborn, Missouri.

== Death ==
Schottel died on August 21, 2000, in St. Joseph, Missouri.

== Head coaching record ==
=== College ===
Year	Team	Overall	Conference	Standing	Bowl/playoffs
St. Benedict's Ravens (Central Intercollegiate Conference) (1953–1962)
1953	St. Benedict's	7–2	4–1	T–1st	
1954	St. Benedict's	2–5–1	2–3	T–4th	
1955	St. Benedict's	3–6	2–3	4th	
1956	St. Benedict's	7–3	4–1	1st	W Mineral Water Bowl
1957	St. Benedict's	7–1	4–1	2nd	
1958	St. Benedict's	10–1	5–0	1st	L NAIA Semifinal
1959	St. Benedict's	7–3	5–0	1st	
1960	St. Benedict's	7–1	5–0	1st	
1961	St. Benedict's	2–7	2–3	4th	
1962	St. Benedict's	0–7–1	0–5	6th	
St. Benedict's:		52–36–2	33–17		
Northwest Missouri State Bearcats (Missouri Intercollegiate Athletic Association) (1963–1970)
1963	Northwest Missouri State	3–5–1	1–4	5th	
1964	Northwest Missouri State	6–3	2–3	4th	
1965	Northwest Missouri State	6–3	3–2	3rd	
1966	Northwest Missouri State	4–5	3–2	3rd	
1967	Northwest Missouri State	3–6	2–3	T–3rd	
1968	Northwest Missouri State	0–9	0–5	6th	
1969	Northwest Missouri State	4–5	2–3	T–4th	
1970	Northwest Missouri State	2–8	0–6	7th	
Northwest Missouri State:		28–44–1	13–28		
Total:		80–80–3			
National championship Conference title Conference division title or championship game berth

=== Junior college ===
Year	Team	Overall	Conference	Standing	Bowl/playoffs
Butler County Grizzlies (Kansas Jayhawk Junior College Conference) (1971–1973)
1971	Butler County	4–6	2–7	8th	
1972	Butler County	2–8–1	1–7	T–8th	
1973	Butler County	1–9–1	0–7–1	9th	
Butler County:		7–23–2	3–21–1		
Total:		7–23–2			
