= Jenny Doan =

American businesswoman and quilter (born 1957)

Coordinates: 39°44′34.31″N 93°59′51.73″W

- Born: June 11, 1957 (age 68); San Luis Obispo, California
- Occupation: Quilter
- Years active: 2008-Present
- Known for: Missouri Star Quilt Company, BLOCK magazine, YouTube
- Spouse: Ron
- Children: 7
- Website: www.missouriquiltco.com

Jenny Doan is an American quilter, author, and YouTube personality. She rose to prominence as the face of Missouri Star Quilt Company, the largest quilting supply vendor in the United States. Referred to as “The most famous quilter in the world,” her YouTube channel has surpassed over 210 million cumulative views, and she is regarded as a leading figure in the pre-cut quilting movement.

== Career ==
Doan showed an interest in sewing from an early age, eventually learning to sew with the 4-H Club youth organization at the age of ten. She maintained her interest in sewing throughout her adolescence and carried that into adulthood, making costumes for the local theater group when she was a newlywed.

In 2003, Doan took her first quilting class at the Grand River Technical School in Chillicothe, Missouri.

After the 2008 recession cost Doan and her husband most of their savings, two of Doan’s children were looking for ways for their parents to bring in additional money. They bought Doan a longarm quilting machine and set up a small business for her to sew together other people’s quilts. Demand was high and customers wanted additional fabric, so her son set up a website to sell additional materials.

Business was slow, however, and a year later, Doan’s children suggested that she record quilting tutorials on YouTube. The videos taught viewers to make a quilt in a day using pre-cut materials, something Missouri Star Quilt Company specialized in. The videos turned Doan into a quilting celebrity and led to an increase in sales.

Doan is a regular feature in MSQC’s monthly quilting magazine, BLOCK, hosts trunk shows weekly in Hamilton, and makes appearances at quilting and crafting events around the United States.

== Personal life ==
Jenny Doan (née Fish) was born on June 11, 1957, to Franke and Deannie Fish in San Luis Obispo, California. Her father was a chemist and her mother was a homemaker and genealogist. At age 10 her family moved to Spreckels, California, so her father could be closer to Salinas, where her father had a job with the Smucker jam company. She grew up in the Salinas Valley and Monterey Bay area.

In 1980, Jenny married Ronald Doan. The family remained in the Salinas area until 1995, when facing financial difficulties, Jenny and Ron decided to move to a more affordable area. Ron suggested moving to the Midwest, to which Jenny replied, “Where is that, exactly?” The family moved “sight unseen” to Hamilton, Missouri, where Ron started working as a machinist with the Kansas City Star and Jenny focused on taking care of the family.

Doan is a member of the Church of Jesus Christ of Latter-Day Saints.
