= Zack Wheat =

American baseball player (1888–1972)

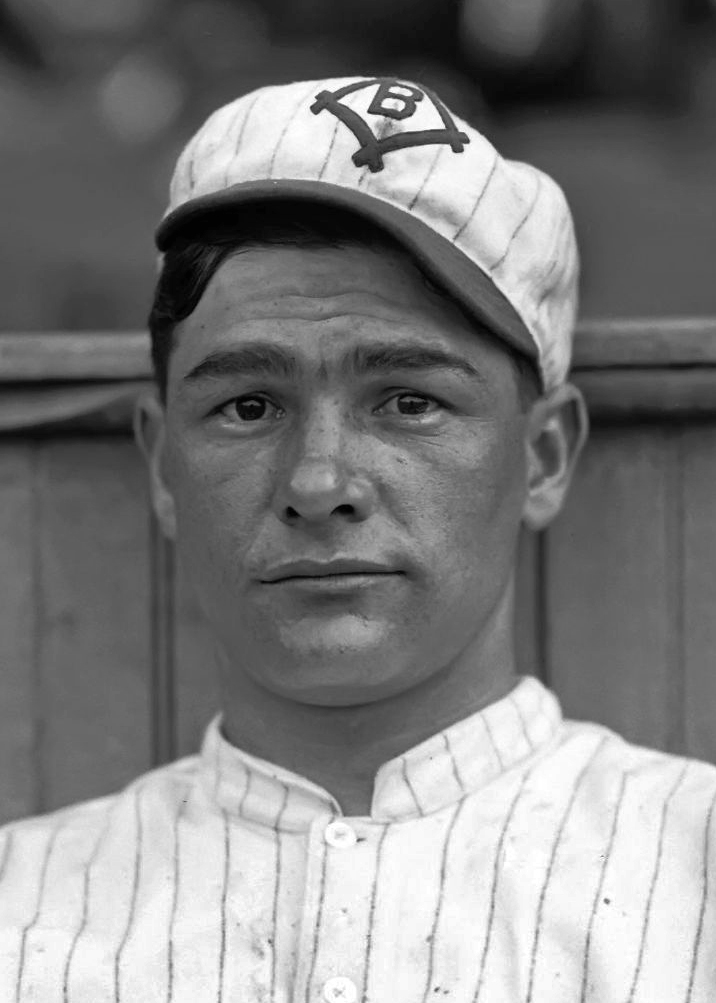
- Wheat in 1912
- Left fielder
- Born: May 23, 1888; Hamilton, Missouri, U.S.
- Died: March 11, 1972 (aged 83); Sedalia, Missouri, U.S.
- Batted: Left Threw: Right

MLB debut
- September 11, 1909, for the Brooklyn Superbas

Last MLB appearance
- September 21, 1927, for the Philadelphia Athletics

MLB statistics
- Batting average: .317
- Hits: 2,884
- Home runs: 132
- Runs batted in: 1,248
- Stats at Baseball Reference

Teams
- Brooklyn Superbas / Dodgers / Robins (1909–1926); Philadelphia Athletics (1927)

Career highlights and awards
- NL batting champion (1918)

Member of the National

Baseball Hall of Fame
- Induction: 1959
- Election method: Veterans Committee

Zachariah Davis Wheat (May 23, 1888 – March 11, 1972), nicknamed "Buck", was an American professional baseball player. He played in Major League Baseball (MLB) as a left fielder from 1909 to 1927, most notably as a member of the Brooklyn Dodgers who were known as the Robins at that time. After 18 seasons in Brooklyn, he played his final season with the Philadelphia Athletics.

Although Wheat spent the first part of his career playing in the Dead ball era, he hit over .300 in 13 seasons and won the National League batting championship in 1918. He ended his career with a .317 career batting average and remains the Dodgers all-time franchise leader in games, at bats, plate appearances, hits, doubles, triples, and total bases. Wheat was also known as a stylish and graceful outfielder, leading National League left fielders in putouts seven times and fielding percentage twice.

Wheat was unanimously elected to the National Baseball Hall of Fame in 1959. His brother McKinley "Mack" Wheat also played in the major leagues, and the two were teammates in Brooklyn for five seasons.

== Early life ==
Born in Hamilton, Missouri, he was the son of Basil and Julia Wheat. His father was of English descent. For many years, it was believed that Wheat was at least partially of Cherokee descent but, according to the Society for American Baseball Research, this was likely untrue.

== Career ==
Wheat began his professional baseball career in 1906 for Enterprise in the Kansas League, followed by Wichita in 1907, the Shreveport Pirates of the Texas League in 1908, and the Mobile Sea Gulls of the Southern Association in 1909. It was during that 1909 season that the Brooklyn Superbas of the National League purchased Wheat for $1,200, and he made his major league debut in September. Wheat batted with a corkscrew type of swing, and held his hands down near the end of the bat, unlike most hitters during his time, a time noted as the "Dead Ball Era". Along with his consistently high levels of hitting, he was also noted for his graceful and stylish defense.

What Lajoie was to infielders, Zach Wheat is to outfielders, the finest mechanical craftsman of them all ... Wheat is the easiest, most graceful of outfielders with no close rivals.

— Baseball Magazine, 1917

Wheat played his first full season in 1910. He played every game for the Superbas that season as the regular left fielder, leading the league in games played. He batted .284 that season, the second-lowest average of his career, which led the team, and was among the league leaders in hits, doubles, and triples. It was in 1911 that his reputation as a slugger began to take hold. Along with hitting .287, Wheat finished eighth in the league with 13 triples and slugged five home runs. In an era when players rarely hit double-digit home runs for a season, five was enough for people to take notice.

Wheat continued his steady and consistent climb up the batting charts in 1912, hitting .305 and finishing the season among the league leaders in home runs and slugging percentage. Over the next four seasons, he continued to be among the leaders in many offensive categories, including home runs, batting average, slugging average, hits, doubles, triples, and RBI. It was during the 1912 season that Wheat married Daisy Kerr Forsman. His wife quickly became his de facto agent, encouraging him to hold out for a better contract each season. Each time Wheat held out, he received more money, the club not wanting to lose one of its best hitters and the team's most popular player. This tactic of threatening to hold out served him well during throughout his career, including during the World War I era, when he raised and sold mules to the United States Army as pack animals. Wheat claimed that he was making so much money from his business that he wouldn't need to play baseball at all. The team, fearing that they might lose a great player during the prime of his career, succumbed to his demands every year.

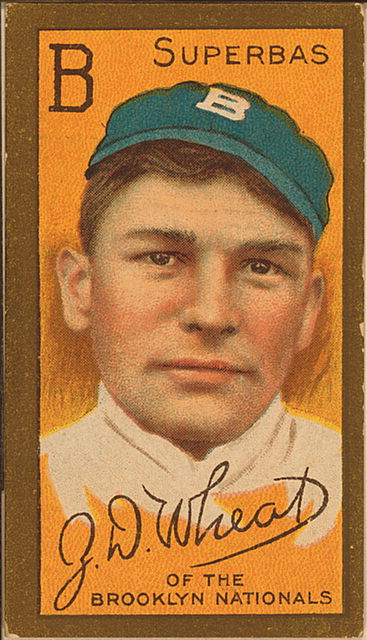
Zack Wheat baseball card, 1911 Gold Borders (T205)

In 1916, Wheat topped off a string of seasons with a finish in the top ten in all the above categories, topping the league in total bases and slugging. He also had a career-high hitting streak, which reached 29 games. The Brooklyn Robins won the National League pennant that season. In the World Series, they faced the Boston Red Sox, who had the formidable pitching rotation of Ernie Shore, Dutch Leonard, Carl Mays, and Babe Ruth. The Red Sox won the series four games to one, holding the Robins to a .200 batting average and Wheat to a paltry .211.

During the 1917 and 1918 seasons, Wheat hit well, but missed many games due to injuries. He had tiny feet, around size 5, and this is believed to be the cause of the many nagging ankle injuries that caused to miss many games in his career. However, Wheat led the league in batting average for the only time in his career with a .335 batting average, his highest average up to that point. Despite being known as a slugger and consistently placing in the top ten in home runs, Wheat hit no home runs that season and had hit just one the season prior. Not until Rod Carew in 1972 would another player win a batting title without hitting a home run during the season.

Starting in 1919, Wheat returned to the league slugging leaders once again as the baseball began to become livelier. The Robins made their second World Series appearance in 1920, this time facing off against the Cleveland Indians. The Robins lost this series as well, 5 games to 2, although Wheat's series average was .333. Wheat's statistics climbed during this new live era of baseball, reaching double-digit home runs for the first time with 14 in 1921, and again three more times in the next four years. Wheat hit .320 or higher every season from 1920 through 1925, topping out with .375 in consecutive seasons. He failed to lead the league in hitting those two seasons, not getting enough at bats in 1923 to qualify, and Hornsby topped the league with .384, and in 1924, his .375 was a distant second to Hornsby's .424.

A subtle but longstanding friction existed between Wheat and his manager, Wilbert Robinson. The friction reportedly stemmed from Robinson's belief that Wheat pursued the manager's job behind his back. When owner Charles Ebbets died in 1925, new team president Ed McKeever reassigned Robinson into the front office and named Wheat as player-manager. Newspapers confirm that he managed the Dodgers for two weeks. McKeever caught pneumonia at Ebbets' funeral, and died soon afterward, and Robinson quickly returned to the manager's position. As it turned out, Wheat never again managed in the majors, much to his disappointment. Moreover, Wheat's 1925 managerial stint never made it into the official records. In 1931, Steve McKeever, Ed's brother, hired Wheat as a coach, leading to widespread speculation that he was being groomed for the manager's spot, threatening Robinson's job for a second time in seven years, and he treated his former star as coldly as ever.

Wheat was signed by the Philadelphia Athletics after his release from Brooklyn in 1927. After the season, he was released again; this time he signed and played for the minor league Minneapolis Millers of the American Association. Wheat played very little that season due to a heel injury, and retired from playing following the season. He still holds the Dodger franchise records for hits, doubles, triples and total bases.

== Career statistics ==
In 2,410 games over 19 seasons, Wheat posted a .317 batting average (2,884-for-9,106) with 1,289 runs, 476 doubles, 172 triples, 132 home runs, 1,248 RBI, 205 stolen bases, 650 bases on balls, .367 on-base percentage and .450 slugging percentage. He finished his career with a .966 fielding percentage as a left fielder. In 12 World Series games (1916,1920), he batted .283 (13-for-46) with 4 runs, 2 doubles, 1 triple, 3 RBI and 3 walks.

== Post-career ==
After Wheat retired from baseball, he moved back to his 160-acre (0.65 km^{2}) farm in Polo, Missouri, until the Great Depression forced him to sell it in 1932. He moved to Kansas City, Missouri, where he operated a bowling alley with Cotton Tierney. Wheat later became a police officer. During his duties as an officer in 1936, he crashed his vehicle while pursuing a felon, and nearly died. Following five months in hospital after the accident, he moved his family to Sunrise Beach, Missouri, a resort town on the Lake of the Ozarks, where he opened a 46-acre (190,000 m^{2}) hunting and fishing resort.

One of the grandest guys ever to wear a baseball uniform, one of the greatest batting teachers I have seen, one of the truest pals a man ever (had) and one of the kindliest men God ever created.

— Casey Stengel, 1965, speaking of Zack Wheat.

Wheat was first voted into the Baseball Hall of Fame by the Veterans Committee in 1957, but could not be inducted because he had not been retired for the required 30 years. The committee unanimously elected him in 1959. In 1981, Lawrence Ritter and Donald Honig included him in their book The 100 Greatest Baseball Players of All Time. In 2006, the stretch of Route 13 that runs through Caldwell County, Missouri was named the Zach Wheat Memorial Highway.

Due to the long-held belief about his supposed Cherokee ancestry, Wheat was featured in "Baseball's League of Nations: A Tribute to Native Americans in Baseball", a 2008 exhibit at the Iroquois Indian Museum in Howes Cave, N.Y.

Wheat died of a heart attack on March 11, 1972.

== Legacy ==
The American Legion Post in Sunrise Beach, Missouri, where Wheat lived following his retirement, is named "Zachariah (Zack) Davis Wheat Post 624 American Legion, Sunrise Beach, Missouri" in his honor.

== See also ==
- List of Major League Baseball career hits leaders
- List of Major League Baseball career doubles leaders
- List of Major League Baseball career triples leaders
- List of Major League Baseball career runs scored leaders
- List of Major League Baseball career runs batted in leaders
- List of Major League Baseball career total bases leaders
- List of Major League Baseball career stolen bases leaders
- List of Major League Baseball batting champions
