= 1959 Baseball Hall of Fame balloting =

Elections to the Baseball Hall of Fame

National Baseball

Hall of Fame and Museum
- New inductees: 1
- via Veterans Committee: 1
- Total inductees: 84
- Induction date: July 20, 1959

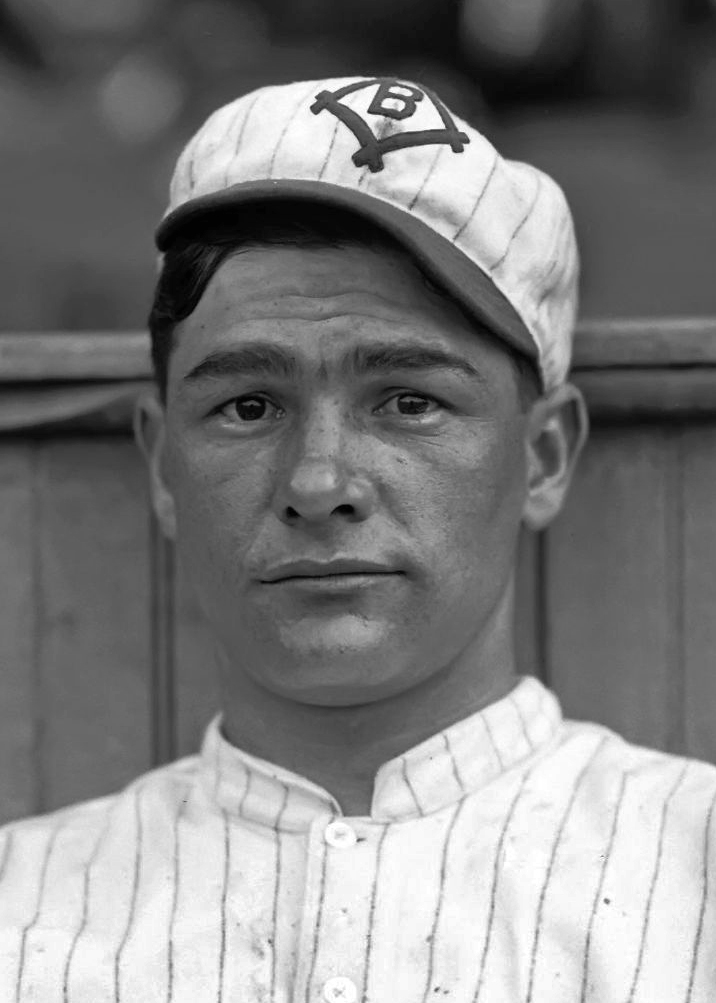
1959 inductee Zack Wheat

Elections to the Baseball Hall of Fame for 1959 followed a system established after the 1956 election. The baseball writers were voting on recent players only in even-number years (until 1967). The Veterans Committee met in closed sessions to consider executives, managers, umpires, and earlier major league players. It selected outfielder Zack Wheat, who recorded 2884 hits from 1909 to 1927. A formal induction ceremony was held in Cooperstown, New York, on July 20, 1959, with Commissioner of Baseball Ford Frick presiding.
