= Penney High School =

High school in Missouri, United States

Coordinates: 39°45′4.53″N 93°59′55.59″W

Information
- Principal: Johnathan Schieber
- Staff: 19.67 (FTE)
- Gender: Coeducational
- Enrollment: 192 (2023–2024)
- Student to teacher ratio: 9.76
- Colors: Blue and Gold
- Mascot: Hornet
- Website: phs.hamilton.k12.mo.us

Penney High School is the public high school in Hamilton, Missouri. A part of the Hamilton R-II School District, the school is named after James Cash "J. C." Penney.

The school district includes Hamilton and Kidder.

== Academics ==
In 2016, the school was recognized for the third consecutive year by U.S. News & World Report as a bronze medal school.

== Sports ==
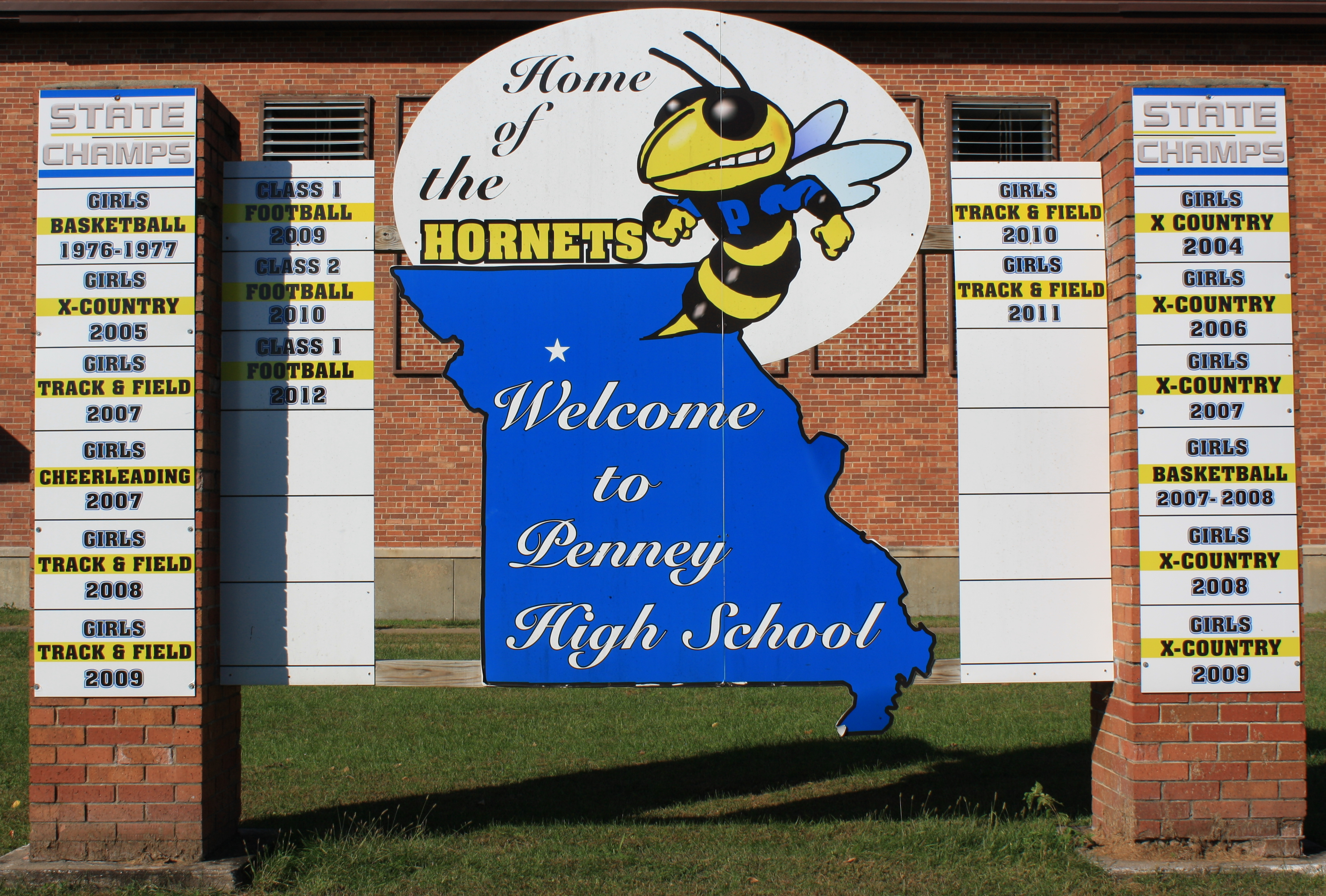

Penney High School is a member of the Kansas City Interscholastic Conference for athletics and music. The girls track and field team won State championships for five years running, from 2007 through 2011, and was runner up in 2014 and 2015. Girls basketball has won a 2A championships in 1977 and in 2008. They finished 3rd in 1978 and 4th in 1979.

The boys won the Class 1A Missouri state high school football championship in 2009, 2012 and 2016. In 2010 won the 2A championship.
