= Hamilton, Missouri =

City in Caldwell County, Missouri, United States

- City
- Location of Caldwell County
- Coordinates: 39°44′38″N 93°59′56″W
- Country: United States
- State: Missouri
- County: Caldwell

Area
  - Total: 1.47 sq mi (3.82 km^{2})
  - Land: 1.47 sq mi (3.80 km^{2})
  - Water: 0.0077 sq mi (0.02 km^{2})
- Elevation: 991 ft (302 m)

Population (2020)
  - Total: 1,690
  - Density: 1,150.8/sq mi (444.32/km^{2})
- Time zone: UTC-6 (Central (CST))
  - Summer (DST): UTC-5 (CDT)
- ZIP code: 64644
- Area code: 816
- FIPS code: 29-30034
- GNIS feature ID: 2394277
- Website: cityofhamiltonmo.city

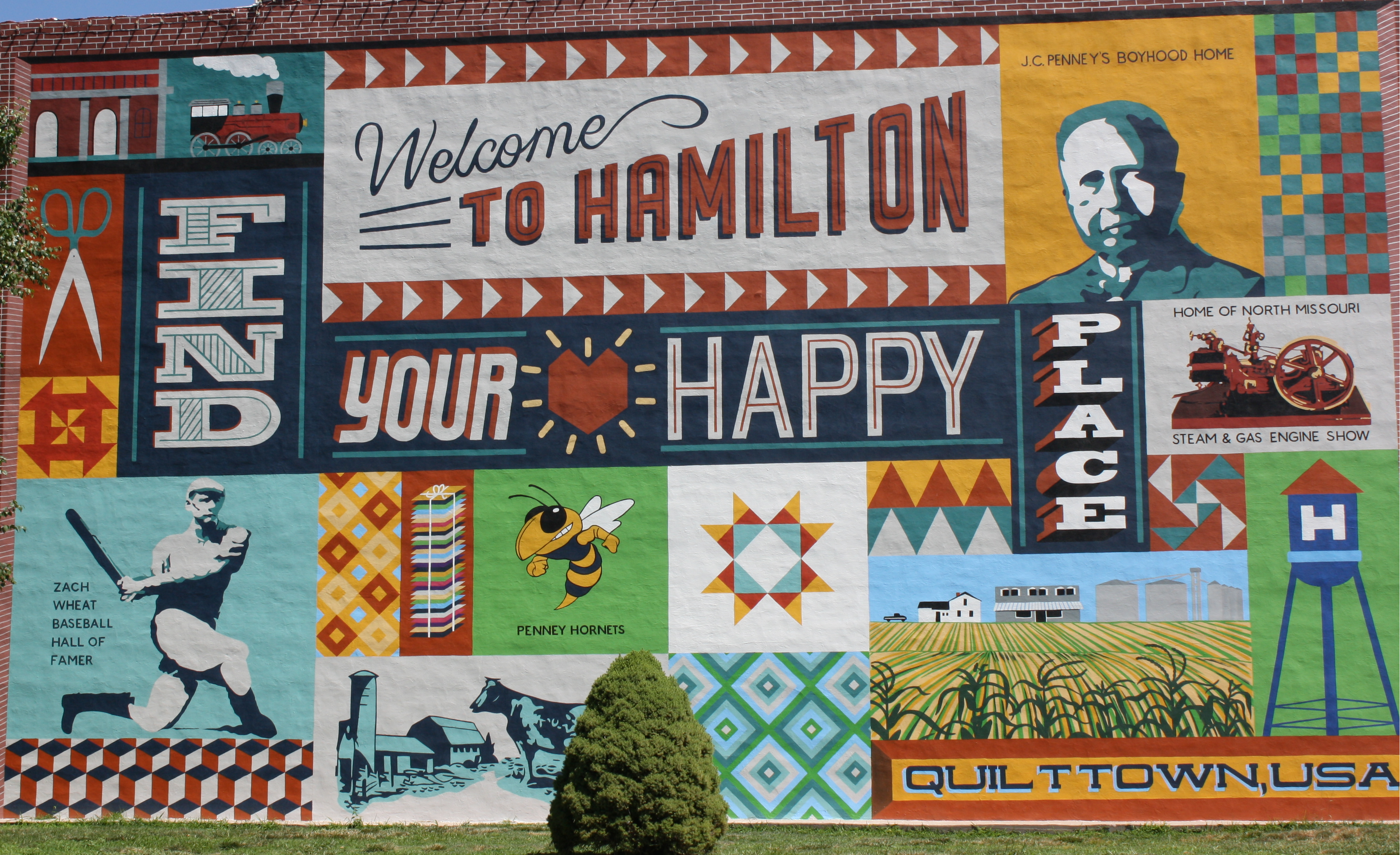
Historical Downtown mural

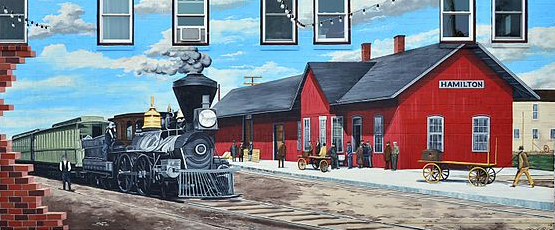
Mural of Hamilton depot

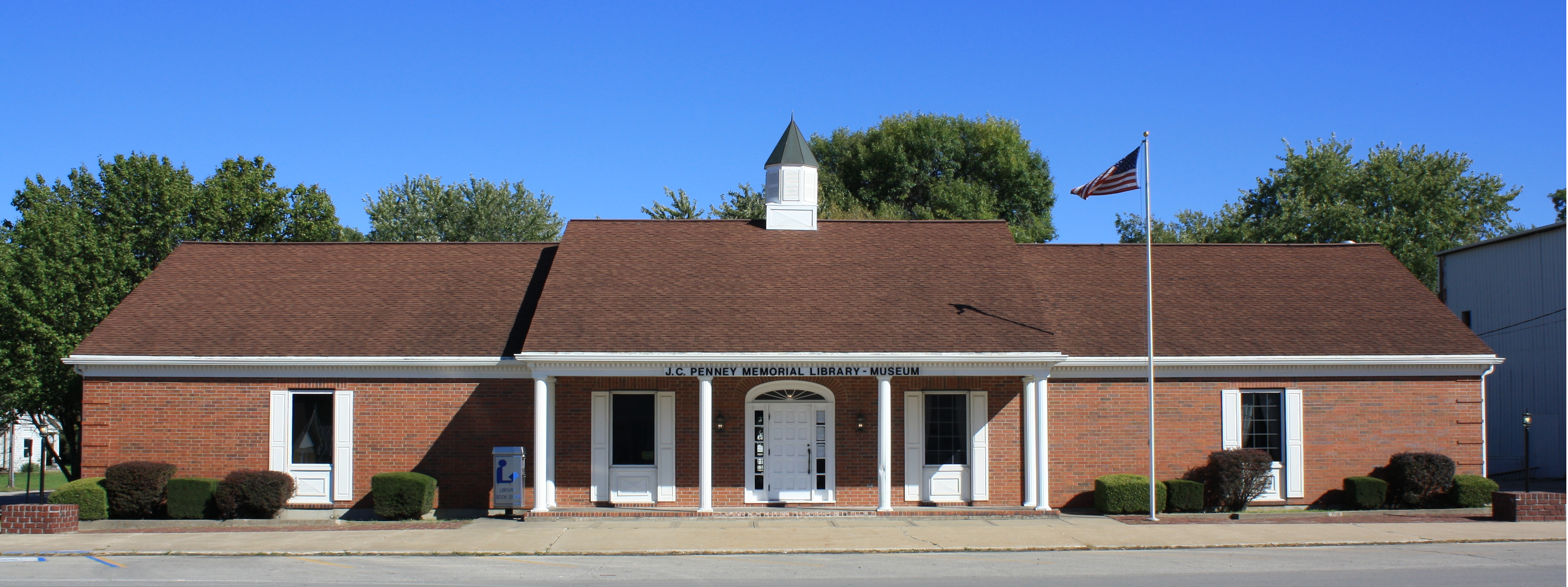
J.C. Penney Library & Museum

Hamilton is a city in northern Caldwell County, Missouri, United States. The population was 1,690 at the 2020 census. It is known as the hometown of James Cash Penney, who built a national apparel-related business, J. C. Penney.

It is also the hometown of Jenny Doan, who developed the Missouri Star Quilt Company. The town is known for an annual quilt festival.

== History ==
Hamilton owes its existence largely to the Hannibal & St. Joseph Railroad. Prior to 1854 the area around Hamilton was unsettled prairie land belonging to the U.S. Government. With the coming of the railroad, the Hamilton Town Company was formed to develop a tract of land along the rails.

At first, the name Prairie City was intended for the new community. However, Albert Gallatin Davis, a key member of the Town Company, chose Hamilton instead, in honor of two early Americans, Founding Father and first Treasury Secretary Alexander Hamilton, and Joseph Hamilton, an early American lawyer and military leader killed at the Battle of the Thames during the War of 1812.

The first house in Hamilton, fittingly, was built by Davis in the summer of 1855, as well as the first business, a general store, in 1857. The store would serve as Hamilton's first post office and Davis as the first postmaster in 1858. The Hannibal & St. Joseph Railroad was finally completed on February 14, 1859, and the first train arrived that day. A railroad depot was constructed by the fall of 1859, with Albert Gallatin Davis appointed the first railroad and express agent.

By the outbreak of the American Civil War, Hamilton consisted of about 25 homes and businesses. The town saw little involvement in the war, despite northwest and north-central Missouri being a hotbed of guerrilla warfare. The majority of the towns residents held strong pro-Union sympathies, with the few pro-Confederates among the populace forced to take an oath of allegiance. Being on the rail line made Hamilton a tempting target for Confederate "bushwhackers", so beginning in the fall of 1861, a company of the 50th Illinois Infantry arrived to help the local Home Guard unit defend the town.

Once the Civil War ended, Hamilton experienced a period of rapid growth, and was incorporated in 1868. At that time several new sections of land had been annexed into the original town plat and the population grew to several hundred. After a brief slowdown caused by the Panic of 1873, growth resumed. By the mid-1880s, Hamilton had two newspapers, the Hamiltonian and the News-Graphic, as well as two banks, two hotels, flour mills, grain elevators, and other businesses supported by a population of around 1,800. Coal mining became of some importance to the town's economy in the early 1880s. The Hamilton Coal Company was organized in the spring of 1882 and began mining operations the following year about two miles outside of the town. A railroad spur line was constructed to connect the coal field to the Hannibal & St. Joseph main line.

== Demographics ==
Historical population
Census	Pop.	Note	%±
1870	975		—
1880	1,200		23.1%
1890	1,641		36.8%
1900	1,804		9.9%
1910	1,761		−2.4%
1920	1,689		−4.1%
1930	1,572		−6.9%
1940	1,655		5.3%
1950	1,728		4.4%
1960	1,701		−1.6%
1970	1,645		−3.3%
1980	1,582		−3.8%
1990	1,737		9.8%
2000	1,813		4.4%
2010	1,809		−0.2%
2020	1,690		−6.6%
U.S. Decennial Census

=== 2020 census ===
As of the 2020 census, the median age was 39.2 years. 25.2% of residents were under the age of 18 and 20.9% of residents were 65 years of age or older. For every 100 females, there were 90.5 males, and for every 100 females age 18 and over, there were 86.4 males age 18 and over.

0.0% of residents lived in urban areas, while 100.0% lived in rural areas.

There were 680 households, of which 29.4% had children under the age of 18 living in them. Of all households, 44.4% were married-couple households, 18.2% were households with a male householder and no spouse or partner present, and 29.4% were households with a female householder and no spouse or partner present. About 32.8% of all households were made up of individuals, and 17.5% had someone living alone who was 65 years of age or older.

There were 778 housing units, of which 12.6% were vacant. The homeowner vacancy rate was 2.7% and the rental vacancy rate was 7.0%.

Racial composition as of the 2020 census
Race	Number	Percent
White	1,591	94.1%
Black or African American	1	0.1%
American Indian and Alaska Native	8	0.5%
Asian	5	0.3%
Native Hawaiian and Other Pacific Islander	1	0.1%
Some other race	8	0.5%
Two or more races	76	4.5%
Hispanic or Latino (of any race)	46	2.7%

=== 2010 census ===
As of the census of 2010, there were 1,809 people, 719 households, and 460 families residing in the city. The population density was 1,292.1 inhabitants per square mile (498.9/km^{2}). There were 802 housing units at an average density of 572.9 per square mile (221.2/km^{2}). The racial makeup of the city was 98.3% White, 0.2% Native American, 0.1% Asian, 0.2% from other races, and 1.2% from two or more races. Hispanic or Latino people of any race were 1.0% of the population.

There were 719 households, of which 34.4% had children under the age of 18 living with them, 46.2% were married couples living together, 13.6% had a female householder with no husband present, 4.2% had a male householder with no wife present, and 36.0% were non-families. 32.8% of all households were made up of individuals, and 14.9% had someone living alone who was 65 years of age or older. The average household size was 2.44 and the average family size was 3.08.

The median age in the city was 38.1 years. 28.7% of residents were under the age of 18; 7% were between the ages of 18 and 24; 22.4% were from 25 to 44; 23.5% were from 45 to 64; and 18.4% were 65 years of age or older. The gender makeup of the city was 47.4% male and 52.6% female.

=== 2000 census ===
As of the census of 2000, there were 1,813 people, 744 households, and 482 families residing in the city. The population density was 1,327.9 inhabitants per square mile (512.7/km^{2}). There were 829 housing units at an average density of 607.2 per square mile (234.4/km^{2}). The racial makeup of the city was 98.62% White, 0.11% African American, 0.06% Native American, 0.06% Asian, 0.06% from other races, and 1.10% from two or more races. Hispanic or Latino people of any race were 0.44% of the population. There were 744 households, out of which 32.1% had children under the age of 18 living with them, 49.7% were married couples living together, 10.9% had a female householder with no husband present, and 35.2% were non-families. 31.7% of all households were made up of individuals, and 18.7% had someone living alone who was 65 years of age or older. The average household size was 2.36 and the average family size was 2.98.

In the city the population was spread out, with 27.0% under the age of 18, 7.7% from 18 to 24, 24.2% from 25 to 44, 18.5% from 45 to 64, and 22.7% who were 65 years of age or older. The median age was 38 years. For every 100 females, there were 85.0 males. For every 100 females age 18 and over, there were 80.6 males.

The median income for a household in the city was $25,972, and the median income for a family was $32,560. Males had a median income of $26,250 versus $17,083 for females. The per capita income for the city was $14,484. About 13.4% of families and 16.1% of the population were below the poverty line, including 20.8% of those under age 18 and 20.3% of those age 65 or over.

== Geography ==
Hamilton is located at 39°44′38″N 93°59′56″W (39.743791, -93.998765).

According to the United States Census Bureau, the city has a total area of 1.41 square miles (3.65 km^{2}), of which 1.40 square miles (3.63 km^{2}) is land and 0.01 square miles (0.03 km^{2}) is water.

=== Climate ===
Climate data for Hamilton, Missouri (1991–2020 normals, extremes 1954–present)
Month	Jan	Feb	Mar	Apr	May	Jun	Jul	Aug	Sep	Oct	Nov	Dec	Year
Record high °F (°C)	72 (22)	78 (26)	86 (30)	92 (33)	97 (36)	102 (39)	109 (43)	108 (42)	100 (38)	96 (36)	82 (28)	72 (22)	109 (43)
Mean daily maximum °F (°C)	35.2 (1.8)	40.2 (4.6)	52.3 (11.3)	63.3 (17.4)	73.1 (22.8)	82.3 (27.9)	86.8 (30.4)	85.5 (29.7)	78.0 (25.6)	65.9 (18.8)	51.5 (10.8)	39.8 (4.3)	62.8 (17.1)
Daily mean °F (°C)	25.4 (−3.7)	29.9 (−1.2)	41.2 (5.1)	51.7 (10.9)	62.4 (16.9)	72.0 (22.2)	76.4 (24.7)	74.6 (23.7)	66.0 (18.9)	53.9 (12.2)	40.9 (4.9)	30.0 (−1.1)	52.0 (11.1)
Mean daily minimum °F (°C)	15.6 (−9.1)	19.6 (−6.9)	30.0 (−1.1)	40.2 (4.6)	51.7 (10.9)	61.7 (16.5)	66.0 (18.9)	63.7 (17.6)	54.1 (12.3)	41.9 (5.5)	30.3 (−0.9)	20.1 (−6.6)	41.2 (5.1)
Record low °F (°C)	−27 (−33)	−27 (−33)	−17 (−27)	7 (−14)	25 (−4)	34 (1)	43 (6)	40 (4)	27 (−3)	14 (−10)	−10 (−23)	−27 (−33)	−27 (−33)
Average precipitation inches (mm)	1.10 (28)	1.64 (42)	2.81 (71)	3.99 (101)	5.78 (147)	4.96 (126)	3.86 (98)	4.27 (108)	4.25 (108)	3.29 (84)	2.25 (57)	1.72 (44)	39.92 (1,014)
Average snowfall inches (cm)	2.9 (7.4)	1.5 (3.8)	1.0 (2.5)	0.1 (0.25)	0.0 (0.0)	0.0 (0.0)	0.0 (0.0)	0.0 (0.0)	0.0 (0.0)	0.0 (0.0)	0.5 (1.3)	1.6 (4.1)	7.6 (19)
Average precipitation days (≥ 0.01 in)	5.8	5.7	7.9	10.1	11.3	9.8	8.2	8.1	7.7	8.1	6.4	6.0	95.1
Average snowy days (≥ 0.1 in)	1.2	1.3	0.4	0.1	0.0	0.0	0.0	0.0	0.0	0.0	0.3	1.0	4.3
Source: NOAA

== Education ==
Public education in Hamilton is administered by Hamilton R-II School District, which operates one elementary school, one middle school, and Penney High School.

The city has a lending library, the Hamilton Public Library.

== Religion and philanthropy ==
The largest church in town is United Methodist, located just north of downtown, with outreach programs including a large thrift store. Various churches help with utility emergencies, and the city hall (200 S. Davis) facilitates help given by Community Action Partnership.

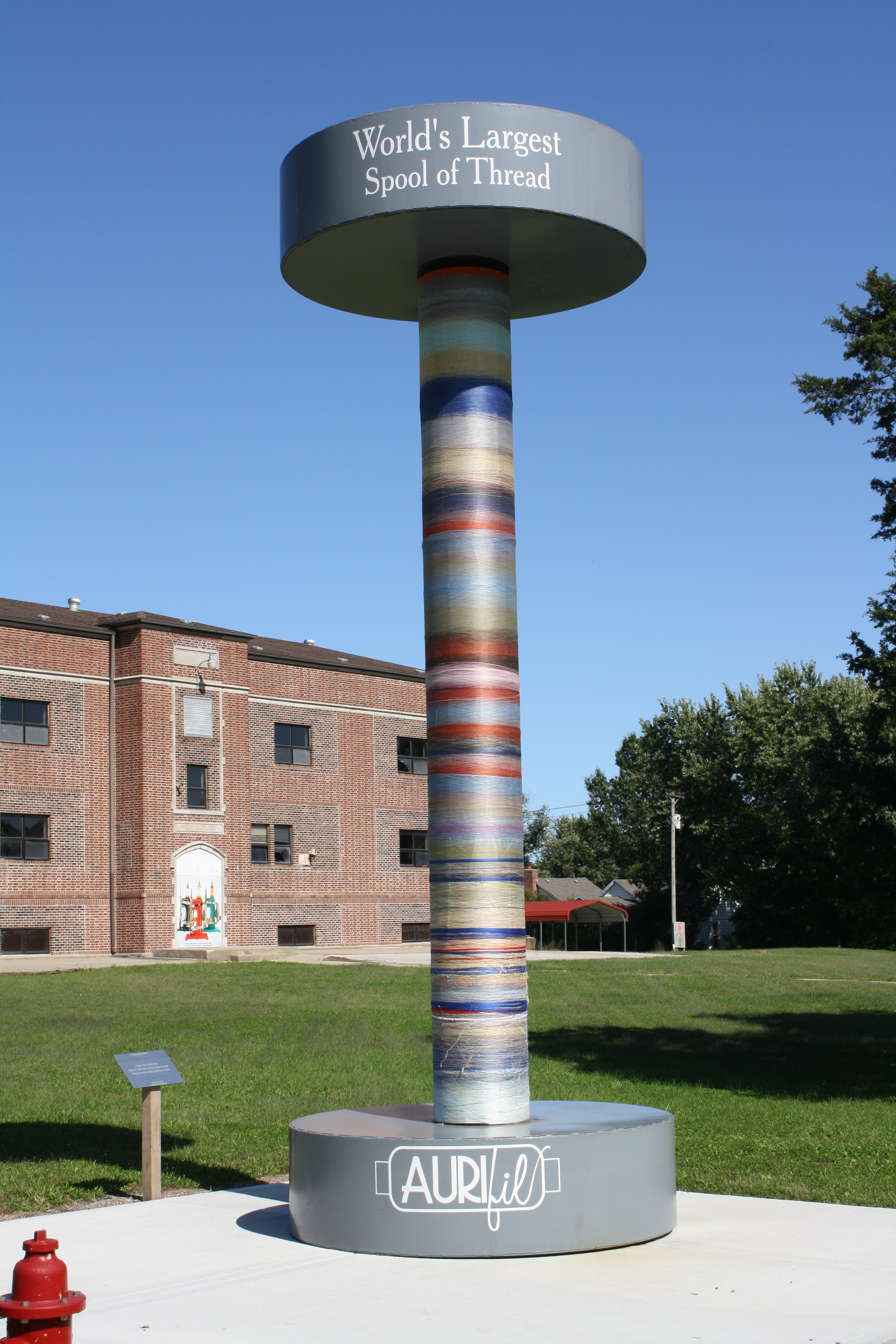
World's Largest Spool of Thread

== Businesses ==
Missouri Star Quilt Company was founded by the Doan siblings in support of their mother Jenny Doan's dream, and in tribute to her talent as a quilter on YouTube. It has grown into a $20,000,000 per year business that owns 26 buildings in Hamilton and is part owner of three restaurants. The business brings as many as 8,000 quilters to Hamilton in a month. Missouri Star has become the largest employer in Caldwell County, with 450 employees. The Doan siblings were named the Missouri Small Business Persons of the Year in 2015, and were named by the federal government's Small Business Administration as the national Small Business Persons of the Year.

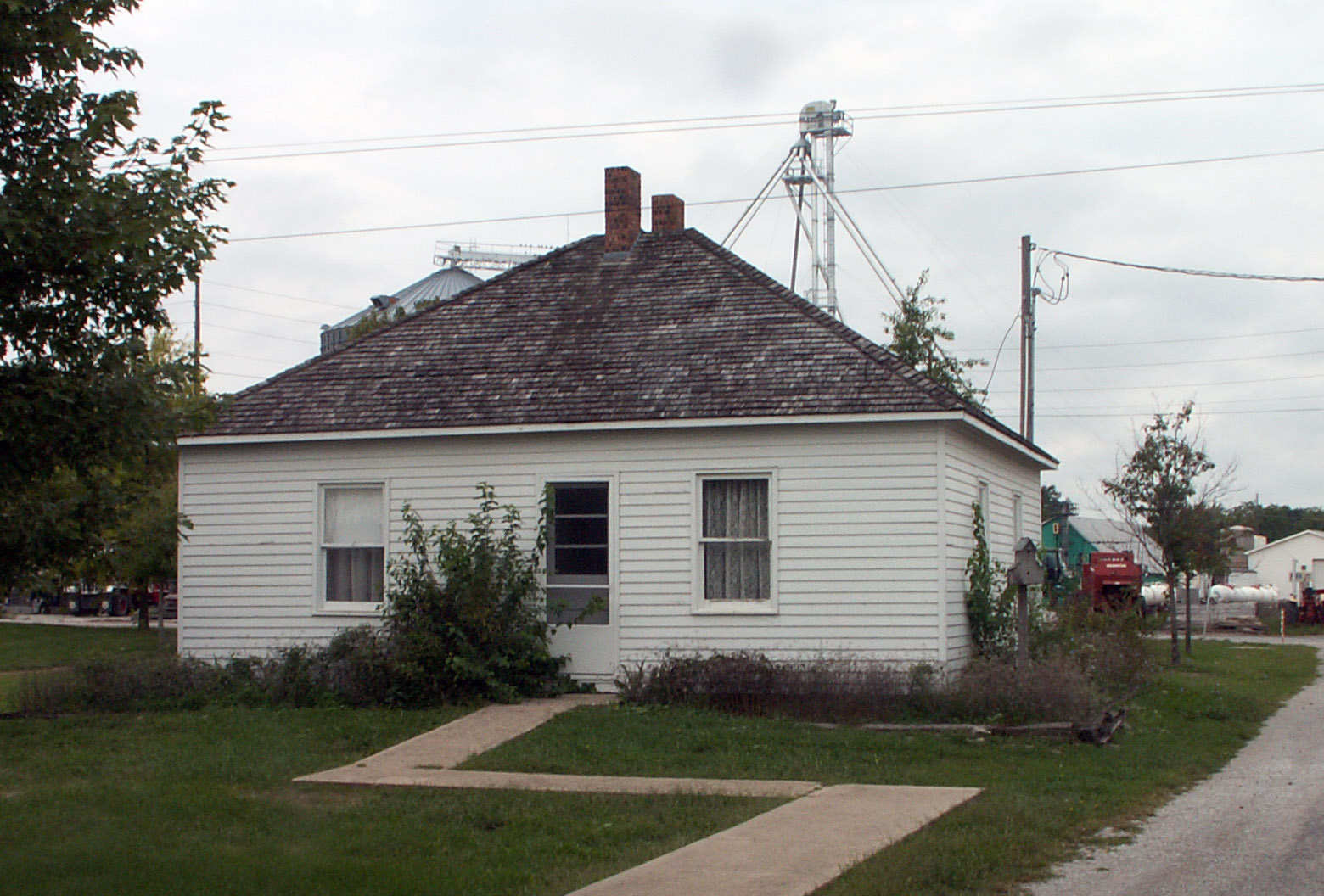
J.C. Penney's boyhood home

== Attractions ==
The active quilt business has inspired the construction of The World's Largest Spool of Thread. At 22 feet tall and 8 feet wide, the spool was unveiled in September 2019, containing 1 million yards of Aurifil thread. Located at 300 East Bird in Hamilton the spool rests on the corner of the Missouri Quilt Museum.

== Notable people ==
- Jenny Doan, quilter
- Dorothea Daley Engel, (1916-2004): her Battle of Bataan experiences as a U.S. Army nurse inspired Claudette Colbert's film role in So Proudly We Hail!
- Dandi Daley Mackall, a 2012 Edgar Awards winner for mystery fiction, one of her 500 books was adapted for the Hallmark Channel film, My Boyfriends' Dogs.
- James Cash Penney, (1875-1971), founder of J.C. Penney; his farm home has been moved to town and is a museum.
- Zack Wheat, (1888-1972) National Baseball Hall of Fame and Museum baseball player for the Brooklyn Dodgers.

== Gallery ==
Churches in Hamilton, Missouri
Select to enlarge
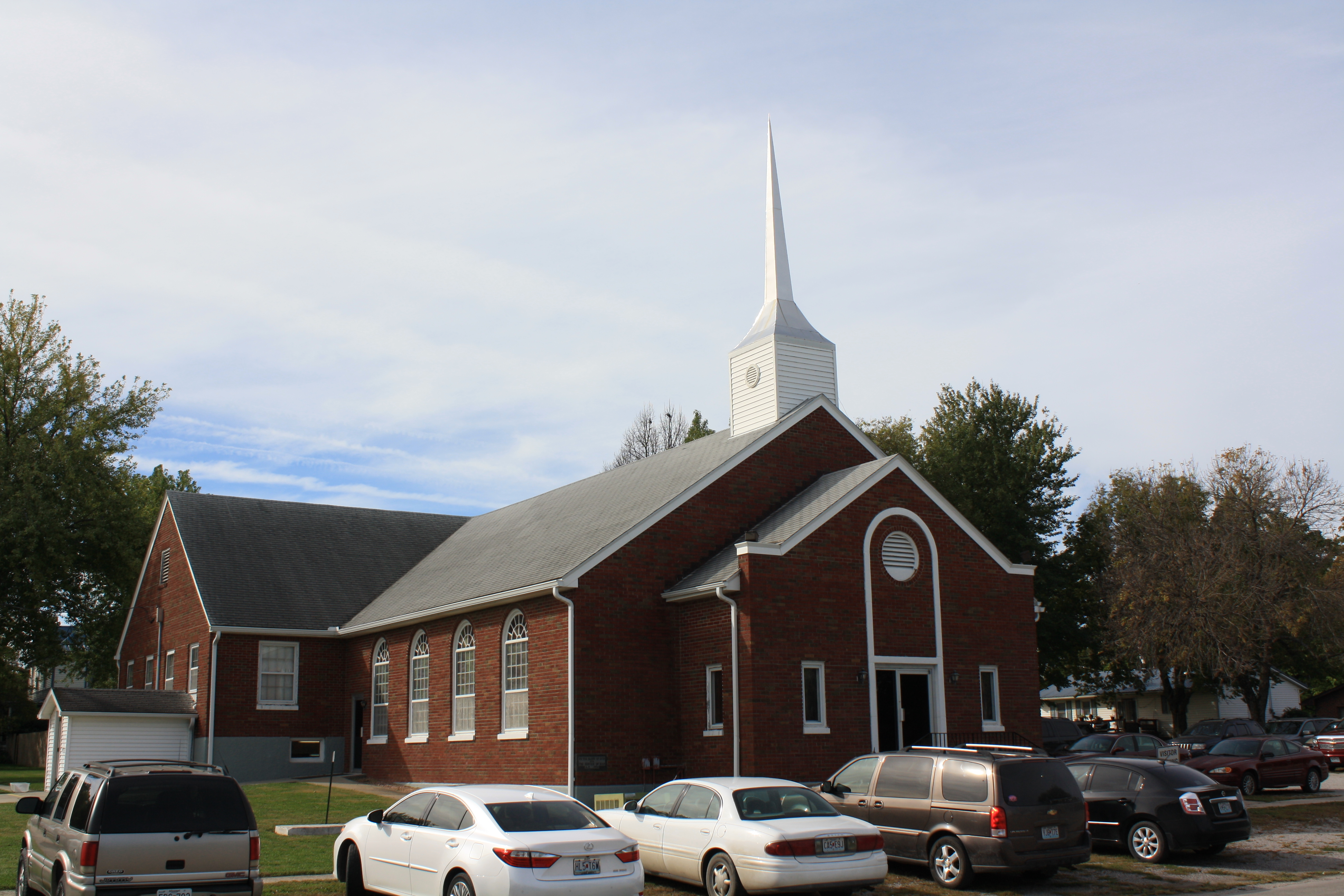
Baptist Church

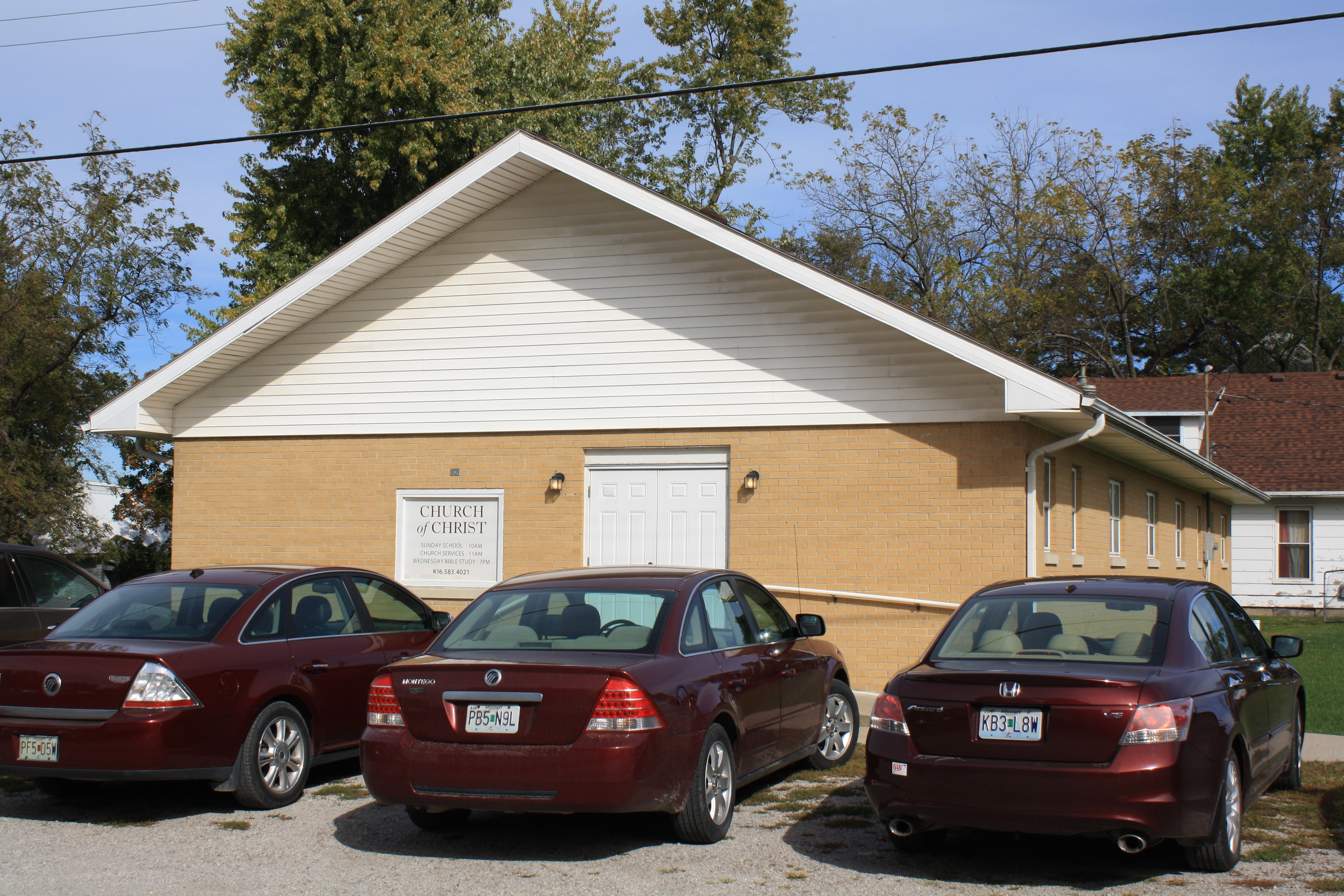
Church of Christ

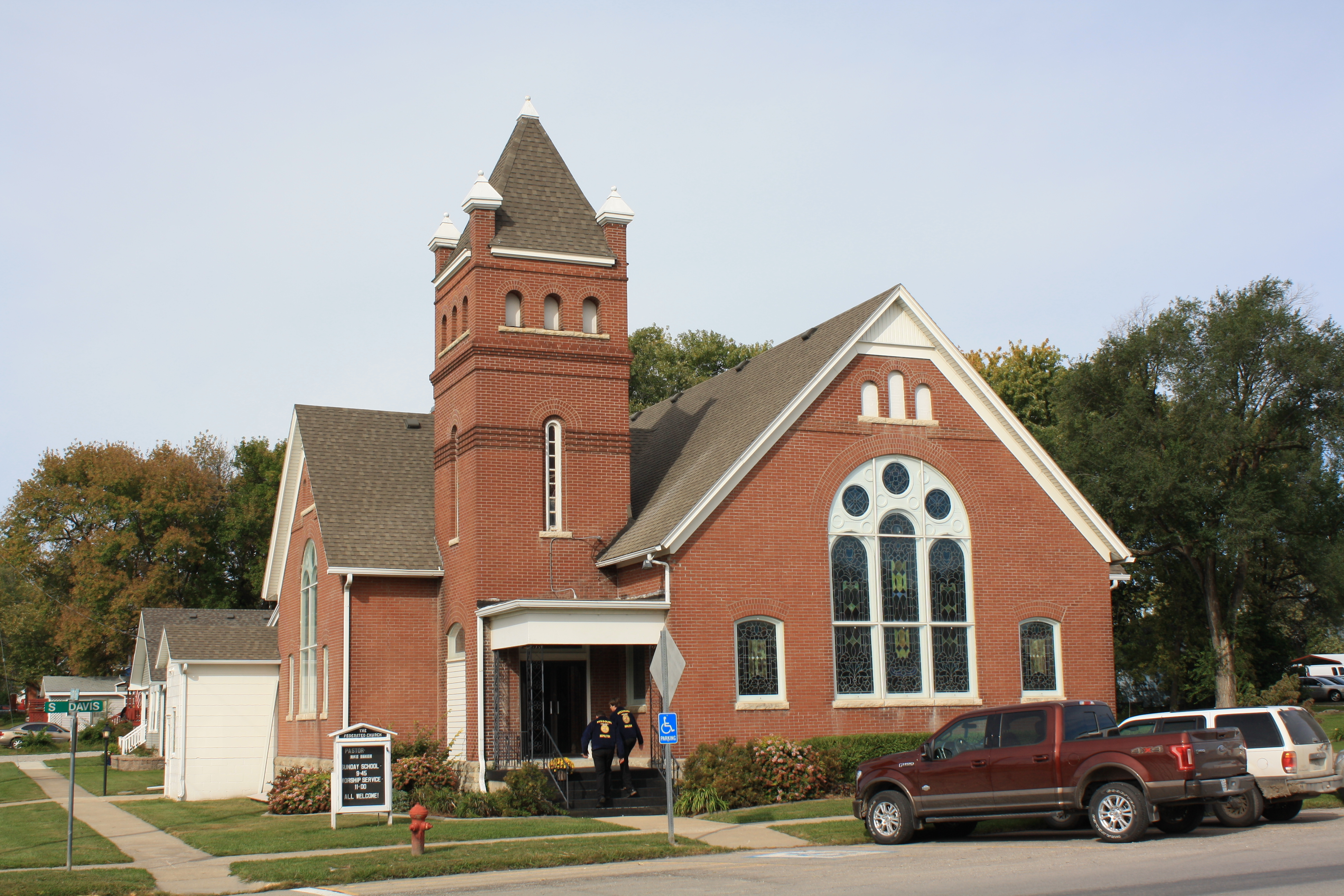
Federated Church

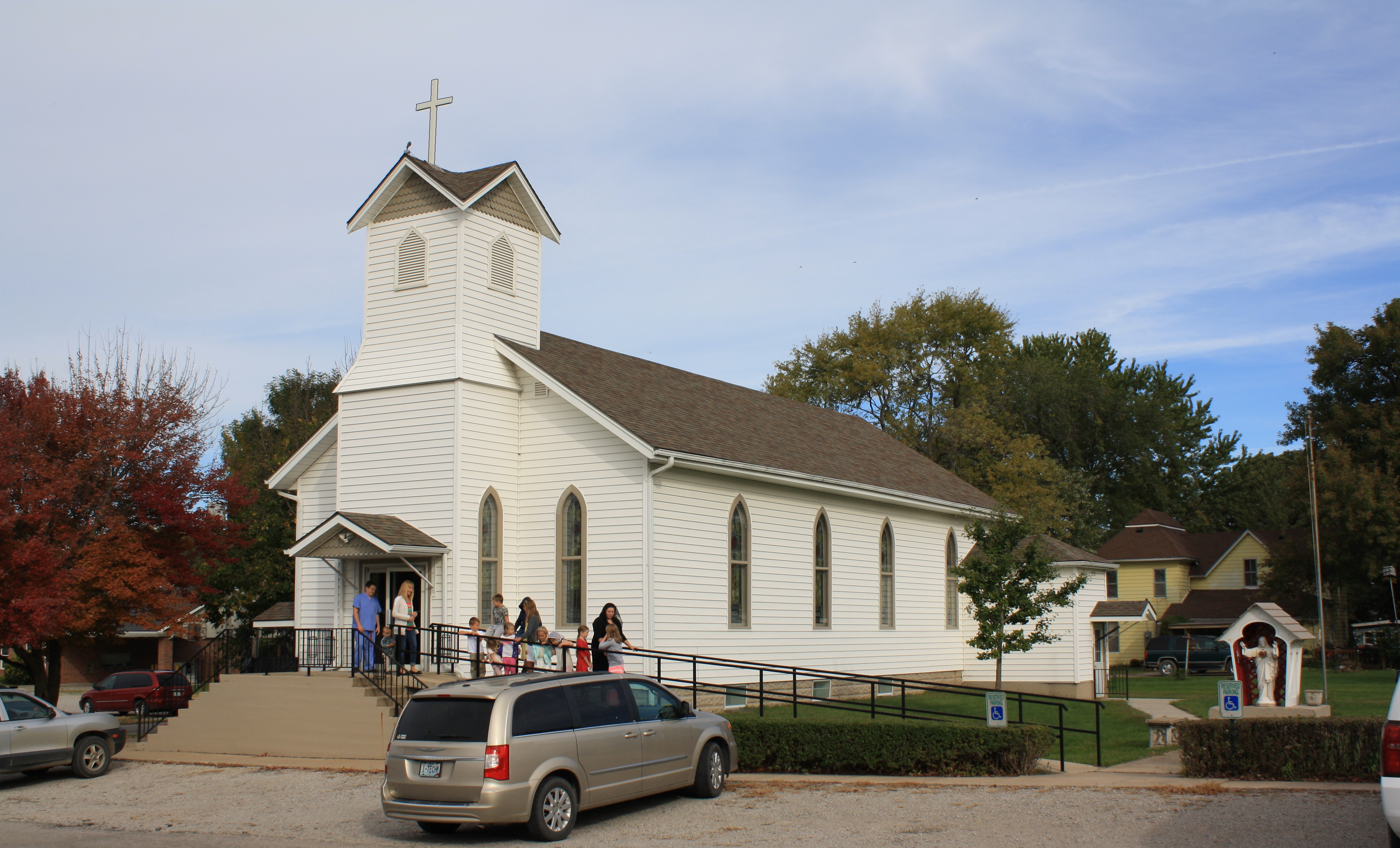
Sacred Heart Catholic Church

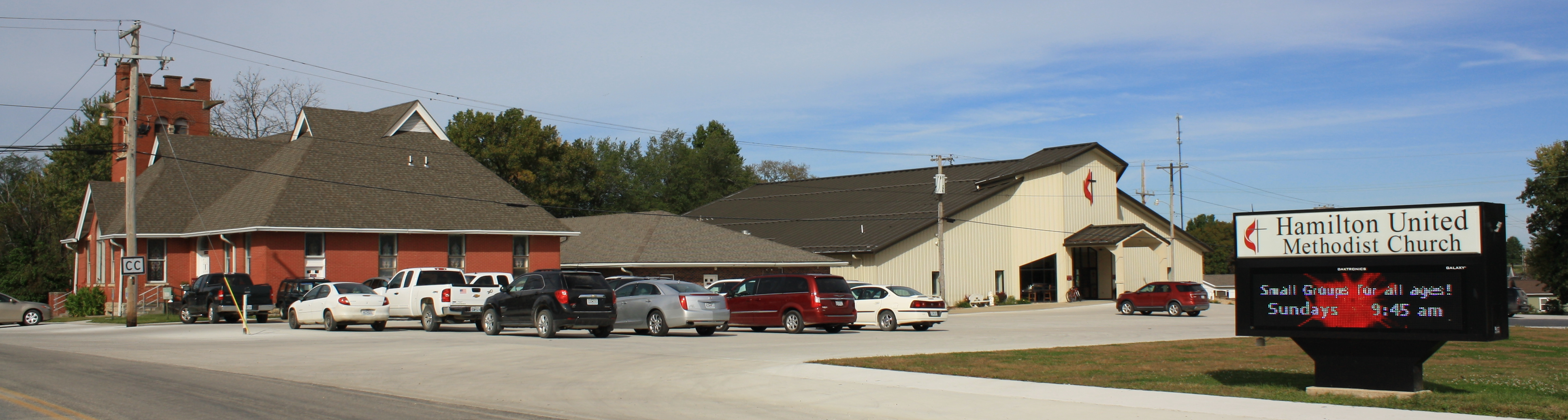
United Methodist Church

== See also ==
- List of cities in Missouri
