= Dearborn, Missouri =

City in Buchanan and Platte counties in Missouri, United States

- City
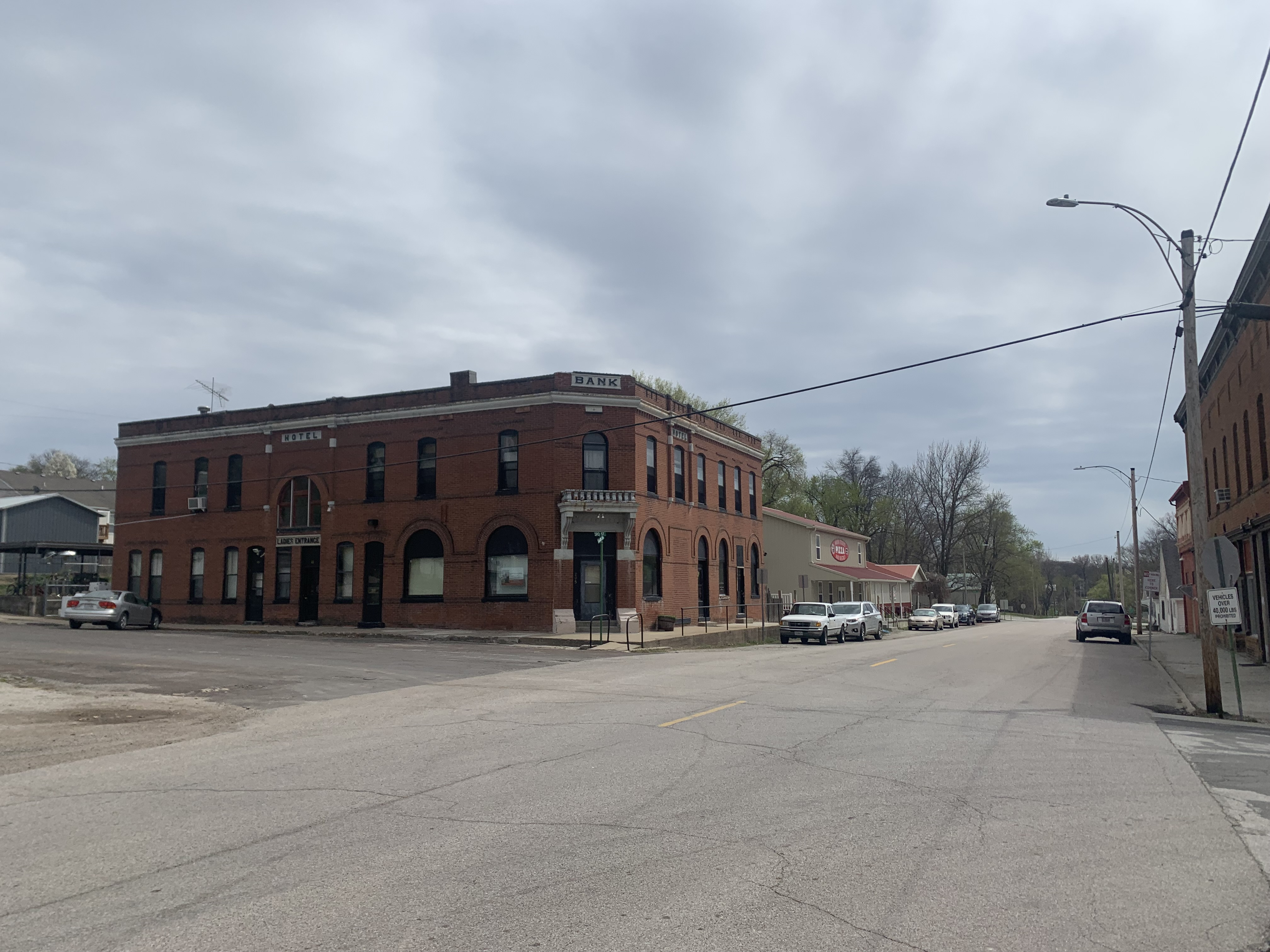
- Main Street of Dearborn, April 2025

- Location within Platte County and Missouri
- Coordinates: 39°31′30″N 94°46′26″W
- Country: United States
- State: Missouri
- Counties: Buchanan and Platte
- Townships: Jackson and Green
- Incorporated: 1882

Area
  - Total: 0.83 sq mi (2.16 km^{2})
  - Land: 0.82 sq mi (2.12 km^{2})
  - Water: 0.019 sq mi (0.05 km^{2})
- Elevation: 879 ft (268 m)

Population (2020)
  - Total: 482
  - Density: 589.2/sq mi (227.51/km^{2})
- Time zone: UTC-6 (Central (CST))
  - Summer (DST): UTC-5 (CDT)
- ZIP code: 64439
- Area code: 816, 975
- FIPS code: 29-18658
- GNIS feature ID: 2394478
- Website: cityofdearbornmo.org

Dearborn is a city in Buchanan and Platte counties in Missouri, United States, that is part of the Kansas City metropolitan area. The population was 482 at the 2020 census.

== History ==
The city was named for Henry Dearborn, Revolutionary War general and Secretary of War, and was incorporated in 1882.

From 1913 to 1933, Dearborn was one of the stops along the Kansas City, Clay County and St. Joseph Railway (KCCC&SJ), an interurban light rail line connecting Kansas City and St. Joseph. Portions of the right-of-way and roadbed are still visible from Dearborn north to St. Joseph.

In November 2012, one of two winning tickets for a then record-breaking $587.5 million Powerball jackpot was purchased at the Trex Mart gas station in Dearborn.

== Geography ==
Dearborn is located in northern Platte County and centered about one-half mile south of the Platte-Buchanan county line. The Dearborn Reservoir is just across the county line to the north. The community is on Routes Z and Y one mile east of U.S. Route 71. Bee Creek flows past the west side of the community.

According to the United States Census Bureau, the city has a total area of 0.91 square miles (2.36 km^{2}), of which 0.89 square miles (2.31 km^{2}) is land and 0.02 square miles (0.05 km^{2}) is water.

== Demographics ==
Historical population
Census	Pop.	Note	%±
1890	239		—
1900	567		137.2%
1910	499		−12.0%
1920	578		15.8%
1930	549		−5.0%
1940	456		−16.9%
1950	391		−14.3%
1960	444		13.6%
1970	543		22.3%
1980	547		0.7%
1990	480		−12.2%
2000	529		10.2%
2010	496		−6.2%
2020	482		−2.8%
U.S. Decennial Census

The Platte County portion of Dearborn (the majority of the city) is part of the Kansas City, MO–KS Metropolitan Statistical Area, while the Buchanan County portion is part of the St. Joseph, MO–KS Metropolitan Statistical Area.

=== 2010 census ===
As of the census of 2010, there were 496 people, 234 households, and 120 families living in the city. The population density was 557.3 inhabitants per square mile (215.2/km^{2}). There were 269 housing units at an average density of 302.2 per square mile (116.7/km^{2}). The racial makeup of the city was 96.4% White, 0.4% African American, 0.2% Native American, 1.2% from other races, and 1.8% from two or more races. Hispanic or Latino of any race were 2.6% of the population.

There were 234 households, of which 26.9% had children under the age of 18 living with them, 41.0% were married couples living together, 8.1% had a female householder with no husband present, 2.1% had a male householder with no wife present, and 48.7% were non-families. 41.9% of all households were made up of individuals, and 20% had someone living alone who was 65 years of age or older. The average household size was 2.12 and the average family size was 2.98.

The median age in the city was 38.7 years. 23.2% of residents were under the age of 18; 8% were between the ages of 18 and 24; 24.5% were from 25 to 44; 25.4% were from 45 to 64; and 19% were 65 years of age or older. The gender makeup of the city was 48.6% male and 51.4% female.

=== 2000 census ===
As of the census of 2000, there were 529 people, 230 households, and 134 families living in the city. The population density was 615.9 inhabitants per square mile (237.8/km^{2}). There were 258 housing units at an average density of 300.4 per square mile (116.0/km^{2}). The racial makeup of the city was 96.22% White, 0.38% African American, 0.76% Native American, 0.19% Asian, 1.13% from other races, and 1.32% from two or more races. Hispanic or Latino of any race were 1.32% of the population.

There were 230 households, out of which 30.0% had children under the age of 18 living with them, 43.5% were married couples living together, 8.7% had a female householder with no husband present, and 41.7% were non-families. 36.5% of all households were made up of individuals, and 18.7% had someone living alone who was 65 years of age or older. The average household size was 2.30 and the average family size was 3.02.

In the city the population was spread out, with 26.1% under the age of 18, 8.9% from 18 to 24, 25.9% from 25 to 44, 24.0% from 45 to 64, and 15.1% who were 65 years of age or older. The median age was 37 years. For every 100 females, there were 100.4 males. For every 100 females age 18 and over, there were 84.4 males.

The median income for a household in the city was $34,861, and the median income for a family was $47,727. Males had a median income of $34,500 versus $24,808 for females. The per capita income for the city was $17,537. About 4.3% of families and 11.4% of the population were below the poverty line, including 12.5% of those under age 18 and 18.8% of those age 65 or over.

== Education ==
North Platte County R-I School District is the local school district. It operates two schools in the community: North Platte Jr. High School and North Platte High School.

Dearborn has a public library, a branch of the Mid-Continent Public Library.

== See also ==
- List of cities in Missouri
