= North Platte High School (Missouri) =

Coordinates: 39.5254°N 94.7708°W

- Dearborn, Missouri; United States

Information
- Principal: Derek Colburn
- Teaching staff: 17.10 (FTE)
- Grades: 9–12
- Enrollment: 199 (2023-2024)
- Student to teacher ratio: 11.64
- Colors: Purple and gold
- Nickname: Panthers
- Website: www.nppanthers.org/o/nphs

North Platte High School is a senior high school in the North Platte R-1 School District. The high school in Dearborn, Missouri serves the rural communities Camden Point, Missouri, Edgerton, Missouri, New Market, Missouri and Ridgely, Missouri all in the northern portion of the Kansas City metropolitan area. It participates in the Kansas City Interscholastic Conference.

The Panthers won the 1998 Class 1A state football championship and were a runner-up in 2023. The school won Class 2 state championships in girls' track in 2022, 2023, 2024, and 2025. They were runners-up in 2021. The girls cross country team won the Class 2 state championship in 2022. The school won the scholar bowl in 2021.

== Notable faculty ==
- Ivan Schottel - Former Detroit Lions football player who coached the team in 1974-75
