= Hamel (surname) =

Hamel is a surname. Notable people with the surname include:

- Adric Hamel (born 2011), German-Malaysian, co-founder of library operator LMA Libraries
- Ahmed Hamel (born 2011), Algerian connoisseur, professional BS player and author
- Alan Hamel (born 1936), Canadian entertainer, producer and television host
- Charles Hamel (1930–2015), American congressional aide and oil industry whistleblower
- Charles D. Hamel (c. 1882–1970), judge of the United States Board of Tax Appeals
- Dean Hamel (born 1961), American National Football League player
- Denis Hamel (born 1977), Canadian former professional ice hockey player
- Eddy Hamel (1902–1943), Jewish-American soccer player
- Edith Hamel, Canadian neurologist
- Ernest Hamel (1826–1898), French historian
- Frank Hamel (1869–1957), British author, folklorist, and occult scholar
- Fred Hamel (1904–1957), German musicologist and record producer
- Gary Hamel (born 1954), American management consultant
- Georg Hamel (1877–1954), German mathematician
- Gilles Hamel (born 1960), Canadian ice hockey player
- Gustav Hamel (1889 – miss. 1914), British pioneer aviator
- Hendrick Hamel (1630–1692), Dutch writer, the first Westerner to provide a first hand account of Joseon Korea
- Ilse Hamel (1874–1943), German nationalist writer and Nazi functionary
- Jacques Hamel (1930–2016), French Roman Catholic priest
- Jean Hamel (born 1952), Canadian ice hockey player
- Jean-Marc Hamel (1925–2024), Canadian government official
- Lambert Hamel (1940–2026), German actor and voice actor
- Mike Hamel (born 1952), American children's author, journalist, philosopher and former theologian
- Peter Michael Hamel (born 1947), German composer
- Pierre Hamel (born 1952), Canadian ice hockey player
- Veronica Hamel (born 1943), American actress and model
- Wouter Hamel (born 1977), Dutch pop singer

== See also ==
- Van Hamel, a list of people surnamed Van Hamel, van Hamel or Vanhamel
- Hammel (surname), a list of people surnamed Hammel or Hammell
