= John Fenwick Hutchings =

Royal Navy officer

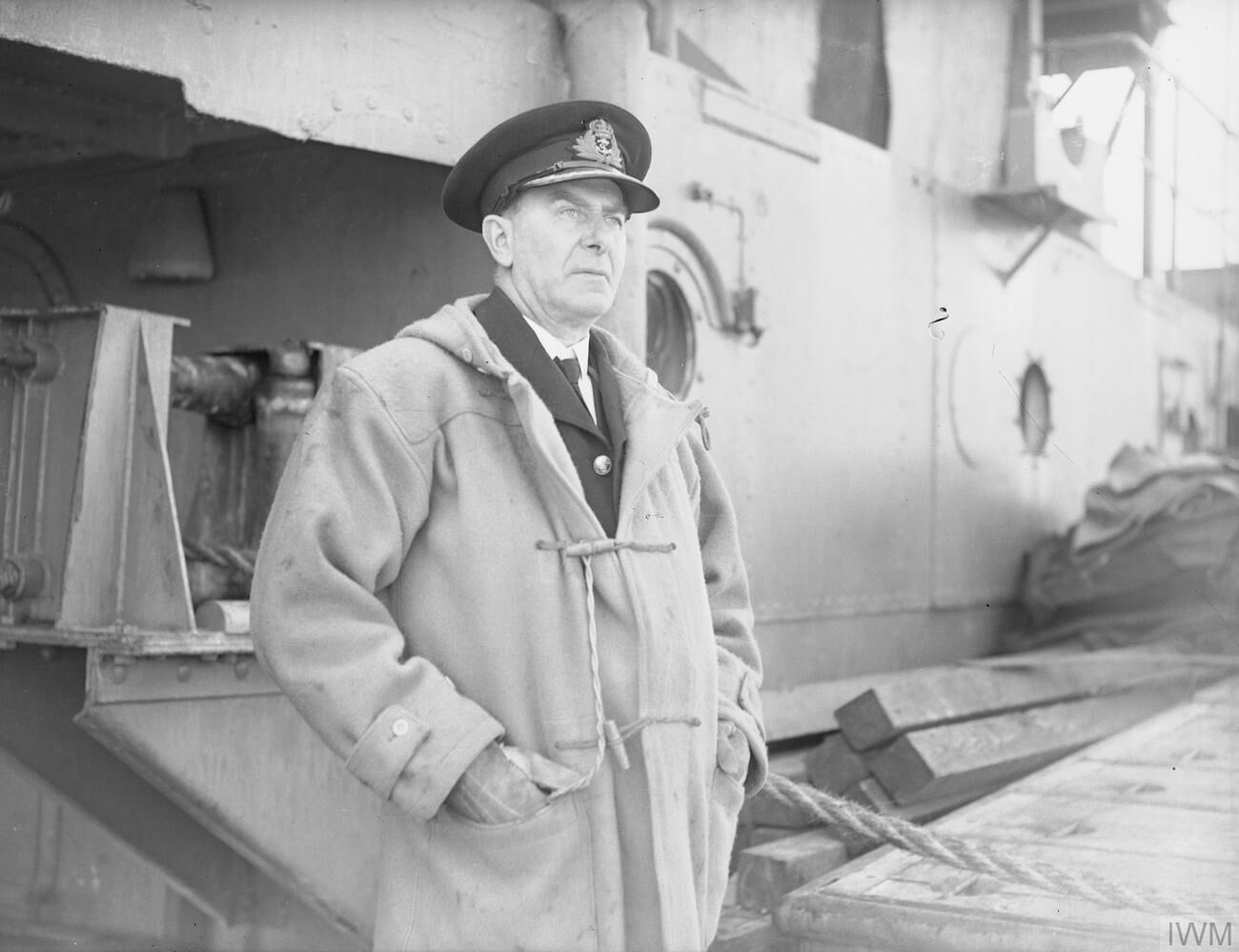
- On board the cable laying ship HMS Sancroft
- Born: 17 May 1885; Christchurch, Hampshire, England
- Died: 20 September 1968 (aged 83); Bishopsteignton, Devon, England
- Military career
- Allegiance: United Kingdom
- Branch: Royal Navy
- Service years: 1900–1934, 1939–1942, 1942–1946
- Rank: Captain
- Commands: HMS A2; HMS C24; HMS C34; HMS G4; HMS K5; HMS K10; HMS K2; HMS K14; HMS Dolphin; HMS Forte; HMS Drake; HMS Orlando
- Conflicts: First World War; Second World War
- Awards: Commander of the Order of the British Empire; Officer of the Order of the British Empire; Distinguished Service Order; Mentioned in despatches

Captain John Fenwick Hutchings, CBE, DSO (17 May 1885 – 20 September 1968) was a British Royal Navy officer who served in the First and Second World Wars. During the latter, he commanded Operation Pluto, the project to construct submarine oil pipelines under the English Channel.

== Early life ==
John Fenwick Hutchings was born in Christchurch, Hampshire, on 17 May 1885, the son of Charles Robert Hutchings, a solicitor, and his wife Lizetta Mary née Atkin. He entered the Britannia Royal Naval College as a cadet on 15 January 1900, and was commissioned as a midshipman in the Royal Navy on 30 May 1901. He served on the armoured cruiser HMS Cressy, and was promoted to sub-lieutenant on 30 July 1904, and lieutenant on 31 December 1906. He applied for duty in submarines, and assumed command of the submarine HMS A2 on 20 August 1908, and then the submarine HMS C24 on 13 March 1909. This was followed by duty on the dreadnought battleship HMS Colossus. He married Dorothy Stewart Kennedy at St Stephen's Church, Broughty Ferry on 18 October 1913. They had three sons and a daughter; one son was lost at sea in 1940.

== Great War ==
Hutchings commanded the submarine HMS C34 from 25 November 1913 to 13 November 1915, with the rank of lieutenant commander from 31 December 1914. He was mentioned in despatches on 13 April 1915 for operations off the Belgian coast. After a time as an instructor at HMS Dolphin he commanded the submarine HMS K5 from 27 April 1917 until 12 April 1920. This period in command was marred on 31 July 1918, when two of her crew, George Booker and Michael Jordan, drowned. Hutchings was blamed to "a certain extent" for not making them put on and blow up their life belts. For "distinguished services in command of submarines throughout the war", he was made a companion of the Distinguished Service Order on 11 June 1919, and promoted to commander on 31 December 1919. A senior officer's assessment of him was that he:

Has rather an extraordinary brain; verges on genius but is apt to be too clever at times. Produces many sound and original ideas but occasionally radically unsound ones which he adheres to with equal tenacity. Brilliant at times but inclined to be over theoretical to the detriment of his practical work. Inclined to be disobedient at times, not with the intention of being insubordinate, but through failing to appreciate when an order should be obeyed implicitly and when discretion should be exercised. Apt to interpret the simplest orders as having some extraordinary ulterior motive.

== Between the wars ==
On 26 April 1920, Hutchings was appointed to command the reserve submarine group at Rosyth. Most of his work after the war involved research and development efforts related to submarines at HMS Dolphin. In 1923, he was thanked for a suggestion about tubular masts for submarines, and he was awarded a patent and a cash gratuity of £25 for a range-estimating device for submarines, followed by another £50 for it as a final settlement in 1925. Another invention was a device that permitted submarines to penetrate anti-submarine nets, which was tested successfully by the submarine HMS L22 in the Firth of Forth. He was appointed an Officer of the Order of the British Empire in the 1928 Birthday Honours.

Hutchings retired from the Royal Navy at his own request with the rank of captain. From 1934 to 1935, he was an advisor to the Greek government on submarines.

== Second World War ==
On 20 November 1939, Hutchings was recalled to active duty as commander of HMS Forte, the Royal Navy base at Falmouth, Cornwall. On 10 June he became the commander of HMS Drake, the naval base at Devonport, Devon, with additional duty as the Defence Liaison Officer Plymouth and Falmouth Areas on staff of the Commander-in-Chief, Western Approaches. Then on 6 November 1940, he became commander of HMS Orlando and the naval officer in charge at Lamlash. He married Olive de Boulez in 1940. They had no children. He was placed back on the retired list on 13 August 1942.

Hutchings's second retirement was of brief duration; on 4 December 1942 he was again recalled to active duty. This time he was assigned to HMS President for duty with the Department of Miscellaneous Weapons Development, where he was assigned to assist Combined Operations Headquarters. On 10 July 1943, he became the Senior Naval Officer in commander of Operation Pluto, the project to construct submarine oil pipelines under the English Channel. By VE-Day his command would consist of several ships, over 100 merchant navy officers and more than 1,000 men. Under his direction, Operation Pluto laid 21 submarine pipelines that delivered an estimated 440 million litres (2.7 million imperial barrels) from the UK to the continent. Hutchings was created a Commander of the Order of the British Empire on 28 November 1944 for "distinguished services in operations which led to the successful landing of Allied Forces in Normandy." He retired from the Royal Navy for the last time on 13 July 1946.

Hutchings died in Bishopsteignton, Devon, on 20 September 1968.
