= Hamelin (disambiguation) =

Hamelin is a town in Lower Saxony, Germany.

Hamelin may also refer to:

== Places ==
- Hamelin-Pyrmont, a district in Lower Saxony, Germany
- Hamelin, Manche, a Commune of the Manche department in France
- Hamelin Bay, Western Australia
- Hamelin Pool Marine Nature Reserve, Western Australia
- Hamelin station, a station in Lower Saxony, Germany
- Hamelin Station Reserve, a former pastoral lease in Western Australia

== People ==
=== Given name ===
- Hamelin de Balun (died 1105 or 1106), Norman baron
- Hamelin de Warenne, Earl of Surrey (1129–1202), English nobleman
- Hamelin du Devonshire et de Cornwall, held 22 manors in 1086, including the Manor of Broad Hempston

=== Surname ===
- Jacques Hamelin, bishop of Tulle, secretary to Francis I
- Isabel Hamelin, 15th century, married to Sir Thomas Berkeley, of the House of Berkley
- William Hamelin, High Sheriff of Warwickshire 1275–1277
- Fortunée Hamelin, wife of Romain Hamelin, friend of Empress Joséphine
- Bob Hamelin (born 1967), American former baseball player
- Charles Hamelin (born 1984), Canadian speed skater
- François Hamelin (born 1986), Canadian speed skater
- Charles-André Hamelin (1947–1993), Canadian politician
- Dave Hamelin (born 1980), Canadian guitarist (The Stills)
- Ferdinand-Alphonse Hamelin (1796–1864), French admiral
- Jacques Félix Emmanuel Hamelin (also Emmanuel Hamelin) (1768–1839), French rear admiral
- Jean-Baptiste Hamelin (1733–1804), French Canadian soldier
- Jean-Guy Hamelin (1925–2018), Canadian Roman Catholic bishop
- Joseph Hamelin (1873–1947), Canadian politician
- Louis-Edmond Hamelin (1923–2020), Canadian geographer
- Marc-André Hamelin (born 1961), Canadian virtuoso pianist
- Octave Hamelin (1856–1907), French philosopher
- Charles Richard-Hamelin (born 1989), Canadian pianist
- Salomon Hamelin, Canadian politician
- Hamelin (bishop), 12th- and 13th-century French bishop

== Other uses ==
- Hamelin ctenotus, a species of Australian skink

== See also ==
- Harmelin, a surname
- Hamlin (disambiguation)
- Hamel (disambiguation)
- Hammel (disambiguation)
- Pied Piper of Hamelin (disambiguation)
- Pied Piper of Hamelin
- Violinist of Hameln, a manga series
