= Hammel (disambiguation) =

Hammel is a town in Denmark.

Hammel may also refer to:

== Places ==
- Hammel Municipality, Denmark
- A town district in Neusäß, Bavaria, Germany
- Hammel and Millgrove, Ohio, United States, extinct towns
- Hammel, Wisconsin, United States, a town
- 3530 Hammel, asteroid
- Hammel Houses, Buildings

== People ==
- Hammel (surname), a list of people surnamed Hammel or Hammell
- Hammel Madden Deroche (1840–1916), Canadian lawyer and politician

== Other uses ==
- Hammel, Green and Abrahamson, an architecture firm
- Hammel (automobile), an early Danish car

== See also ==
- Ras Hammel
- Hammels, Queens, New York City
- Hamal (disambiguation)
- Hamel (disambiguation)
- Hammelburg, Bavaria, Germany
