= Pied Piper (disambiguation) =

The Pied Piper is the title character of the traditional German folk tale the Pied Piper of Hamelin.

Pied Piper may also refer to:

== Music ==
- The Pied Pipers, a singing group in the 1940s through the 1950s
- "The Pied Piper" (song), a song written and originally recorded by Steve Duboff and Artie Kornfield and by Crispian St. Peters in 1966
- "Pied Piper", a song by Jethro Tull, from their 1976 album Too Old to Rock 'n' Roll: Too Young to Die!
- "Pied Piper", a song by Petra, from their 1983 album Not of this World
- "Pied Piper" (BTS song), 2017
- Pied Piper, a 1984 album by Chico Freeman
- The Pied Piper, a 1995 compilation album of Bunny Berigan recordings dating from 1935 to 1940
- Pied Piper, a 1995 compilation album of Crispian St. Peters recordings dating from the 1960s
- Pied Piper (Donovan album), 2002
- Pied Piper (The Pillows album), 2008
- DJ Pied Piper and the Masters of Ceremonies, a UK garage collaboration

== Film and television ==
- The Pied Piper (1933 film), an animated film in the Silly Symphonies series
- The Pied Piper (1942 film), starring Monty Woolley, based on the 1942 novel by Nevil Shute
- The Pied Piper (1972 film), a Jacques Demy film, starring Donovan
- The Pied Piper (1986 film), a Czechoslovak animated film
- "The Pied Piper," a 1990 episode of War of the Worlds
- The Pied Piper, a radio and later television children's program presented in Australia by Keith Smith
- The Pied Piper (Shrek), a character in Shrek Forever After
- Pied Piper (TV series), a 2016 South Korean drama
- "Pied Piper", a fictional application and cloud storage company featured in the HBO series Silicon Valley

== Literature ==
- Pied Piper (novel), a 1942 novel by Nevil Shute
- The Pied Piper, a 1999 novel by Ridley Pearson
- Pied Piper (DC Comics), a DC comic book character
- Pied Piper Comics, a short-lived US comic book publisher in the late 1980s

== Other uses ==
- Keith Bisel, the Pied Piper of Pickleball
- Dean Corll (1939–1973), serial killer known as Pied Piper
- Eurytela hiarbas, a brush-footed butterfly commonly known as the pied piper
- R. Kelly (born 1967), singer sometimes known as, "The Pied Piper of R&B"
- Operation Pied Piper, the codename for the evacuation of British children during World War II
- Operation Pied Piper, the codename for an evacuation of refugees from Romania to Palestine during World War II arranged by Joice and Sydney Loch
- Xenosaga: Pied Piper, a video game
- Pied Piper (computer), a home computer sold by International Semi-Tech Microsystems in 1983

== See also ==
- Charles Schmid (1942–1975), serial killer known as "The Pied Piper of Tucson"
- Pied Piper of Hamelin (disambiguation)
- Piper (disambiguation)
- Pied (disambiguation)
