= Millgrove =

Millgrove may refer to:

== Australia ==
- Millgrove, Victoria
  - Millgrove railway station

== Canada ==
- Millgrove, Ontario

== United States ==
- Millgrove, Indiana
- Millgrove Township, Steuben County, Indiana
- Millgrove, New York
- Hammel and Millgrove, Ohio
- West Millgrove, Ohio
