= Hamel =

Hamel may refer to:

== Places ==
- El Hamel, Algeria, a commune
- Hamel, Western Australia, a town
- Hamel, Nord, France, a commune
- Le Hamel (disambiguation), three communes in France
- Hamel, Illinois, United States, a village
- Hamel, Minnesota, United States, a neighborhood of Medina
- Hamel (river), Lower Saxony, Germany

== People ==
- Hamel (surname)

== Other uses ==
- Battle of Hamel, an Allied World War I attack in and around the French town of Le Hamel
- HAMEL, a type of steel pipe used in Operation Pluto in World War II
- Hamel Basis, in linear algebra the most common type of basis for a vector space
- Callejón de Hamel, a notable alley in Havana, Cuba

== See also ==
- Cole Hamels (born 1983), American Major League Baseball pitcher
- Hamell on Trial, one-man band of Ed Hamell
- Hammel (disambiguation)
