= Alain Chédotal =

French researcher (born 1967)

Alain Chédotal (born 18 September 1967 in Nantes) is a French researcher specialising in the development of neural circuits. He has been a member of the French Academy of sciences since 2017.

== Biography ==
Alain Chédotal studied biology at the Lycée Clemenceau (Nantes) and joined the École Normale Supérieure de Lyon in 1988. He is moving into Neuroscience research after an internship in Dr. Edith Hamel's laboratory at the Montreal Neurological Institute (Canada), where he will also spend a year as a cooperator. Back in France, he enrolled in a PhD thesis in the Inserm team of Dr Constantino Sotelo at the Salpêtrière Hospital and Pierre et Marie Curie University (currently Sorbonne University). He will study the migration of neurons in mouse embryos and the development of connections between the brain stem and the cerebellum. He joined Dr. Corey Goodman's laboratory at the University of California at Berkeley (USA) for a post-doctoral fellowship where he contributed to the identification of new receptors involved in axon guidance and various diseases, including cancers. Alain Chédotal was recruited at Inserm in 1997 and set up his own team first at the Salpêtrière Hospital, then on the Jussieu campus, before joining the Institut de la Vision in 2008 (Inserm, CNRS, Sorbonne University, Hôpital des Quinze-Vingts). During his career, Alain Chédotal acquired multidisciplinary experience in Neuroanatomy, Experimental Embryology, Genetics, Cell Biology, Molecular Biology and Imaging.

In 2018, Alain Chédotal is coordinating Inserm's transversal HuDeCA research programme, which aims to establish the cellular mapping of the human embryo. He is a member of the organizing committee of the permanent exhibition "Cerveau" at the Cité des sciences et de l'industrie.

== Scientific contributions ==
Since his thesis, Alain Chédotal has been interested in the development of neurons (called commissuraux) whose axons interconnect the right and left halves of the brain. These neurons allow 3D vision, the localization of sounds in space, the coordination of muscle contraction during movement, especially during walking. Their abnormal development is at the origin of neurological diseases such as mirror movements or HGPPS, a rare disease (mutation of the ROBO3 gene) that combines severe scoliosis and strabismus In a series of articles published over the past 20 years, Alain Chédotal has identified some of the molecular and cellular mechanisms controlling axon guidance and neuron migration in several brain regions.

His team is also studying the evolution of axonal guidance mechanisms. His recent work has called into question the existence of a chemotropism of commissural axons, one of the dogmas in the field. He has recently demonstrated that certain guidance molecules are key regulators of normal and pathological angiogenesis, and that blocking these signals could potentially be used to treat neovascular eye diseases. His team also develops projects on the regeneration and repair of the optic nerve and cornea.

Alain Chédotal's laboratory has developed an innovative technique for three-dimensional imaging by optical cutting of thick, whole samples (mouse embryos, postnatal brain) made transparent using organic solvents and imaged with a light-sheet microscope. This method revolutionizes and facilitates the way in which the neuroanatomical organization of the brain, but also of all tissues, can be studied. He applied this method to the study of human embryonic and foetal development and began to build the first 3D cellular atlas of human embryonic development.

== Honours and awards ==
Alain Chédotal has been a member of EMBO since 2019, of the Academia Europaea since 2016 and of the French Academy of sciences since 2017 and was President of the Scientific Council of the Foundation for Medical Research (2020-2022).

=== Prizes ===
- 2022 : Krieg Cortical Kudos Discoverer Award of the Cajal Club
- 2017 :
  - Remedios Caro Almela Prize.
  - Inserm Research Prize.
- 2002: Winner of the Schlumberger Foundation for Education and Research.
- 2001: Young Investigator Award from the European Society of Neurochemistry.
