= Le Hamel =

Le Hamel is the name of the following communes in France:

- Le Hamel, Oise, in the Oise department
- Le Hamel, Somme, in the Somme department
- Le Hamel, a hamlet of the commune of Asnelles, Calvados

== See also ==
- Hamel (disambiguation)
