= HMS Conundrum =

Pipelaying drum, WW2

HMS Conundrum was the unofficial name given to the large drums used for laying the World War II Normandy landings PLUTO pipeline. The drums were cone-ended, hence the abbreviation CONUN and were used in the sea, hence subsequent ship HMS Conundrum nickname. They were 30 feet in diameter and weighed 250 tons.

Views of "HMS Conundrum" components

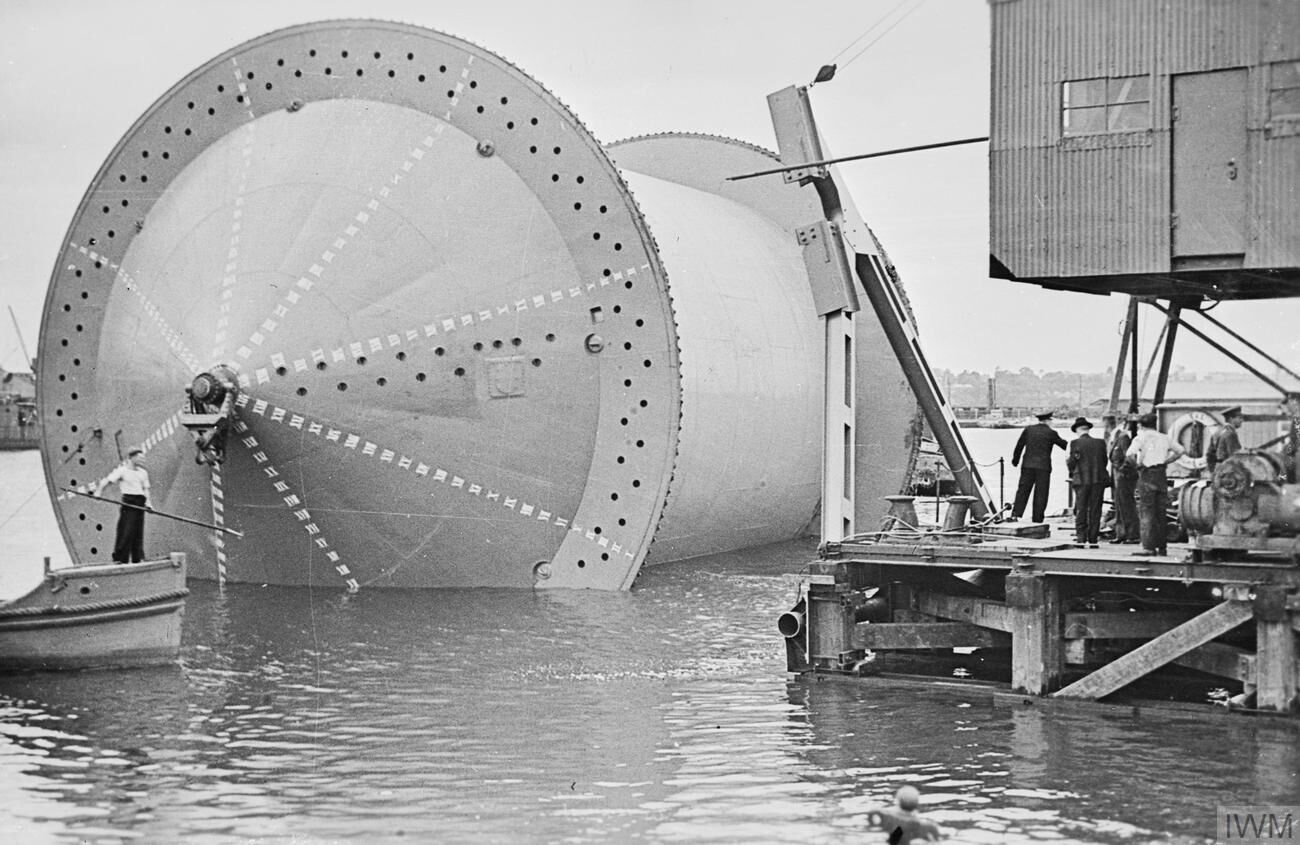
A Conundrum being moved into position into a specially constructed dock in preparation for the winding on of the pipe.

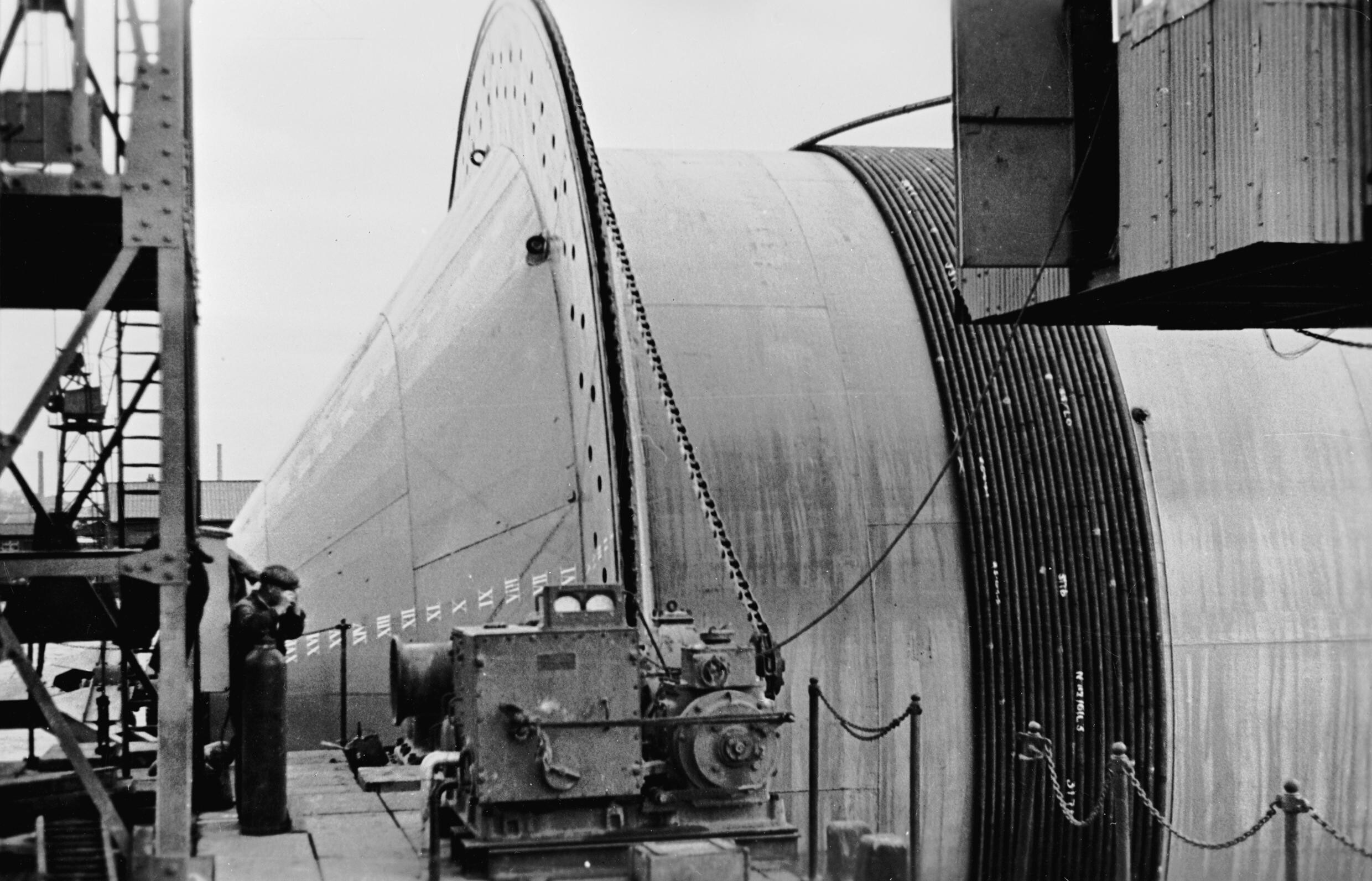
Pipe being wound onto a Conundrum, June 1944.

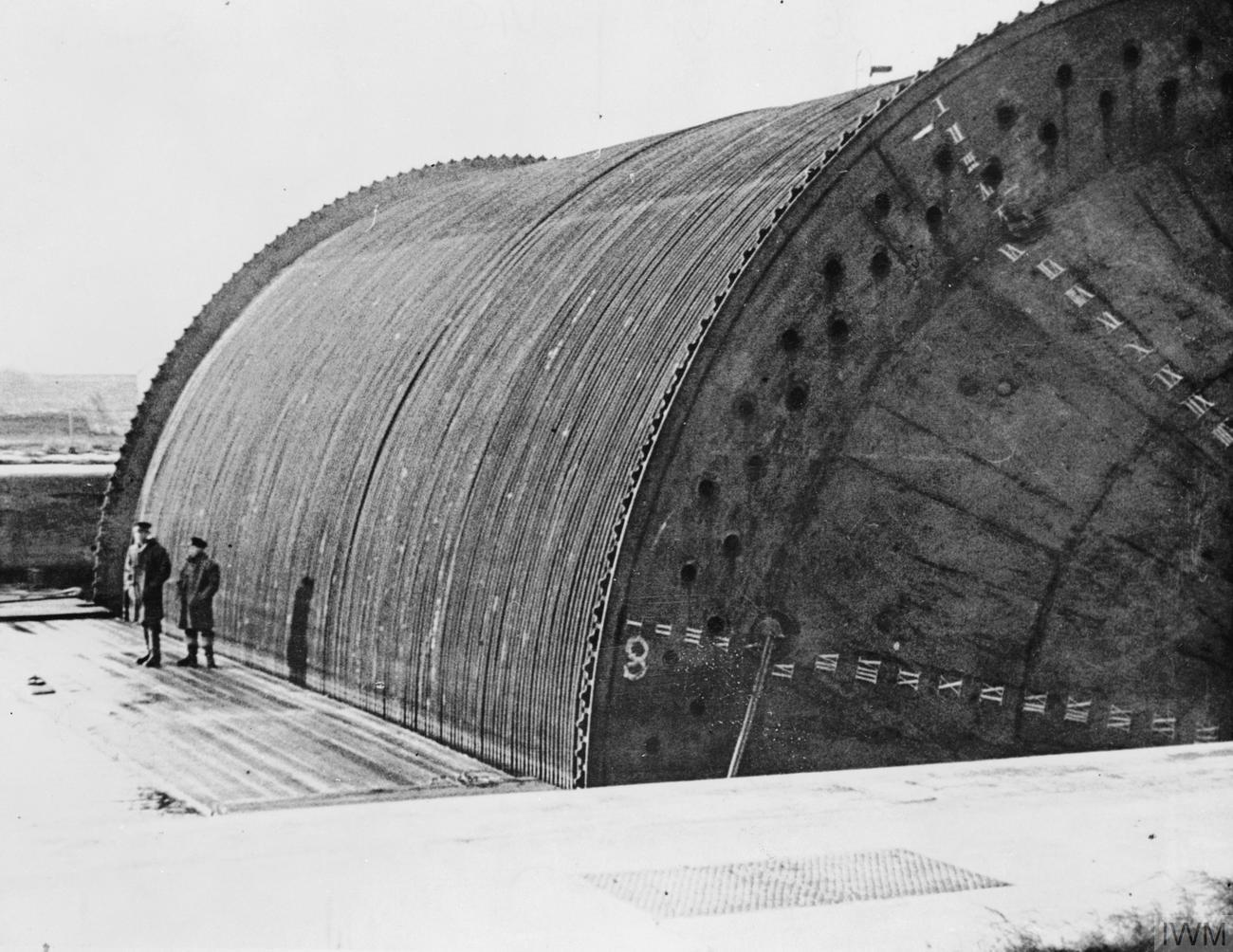
A Conundrum loaded with pipe, ready to be towed across the Channel.

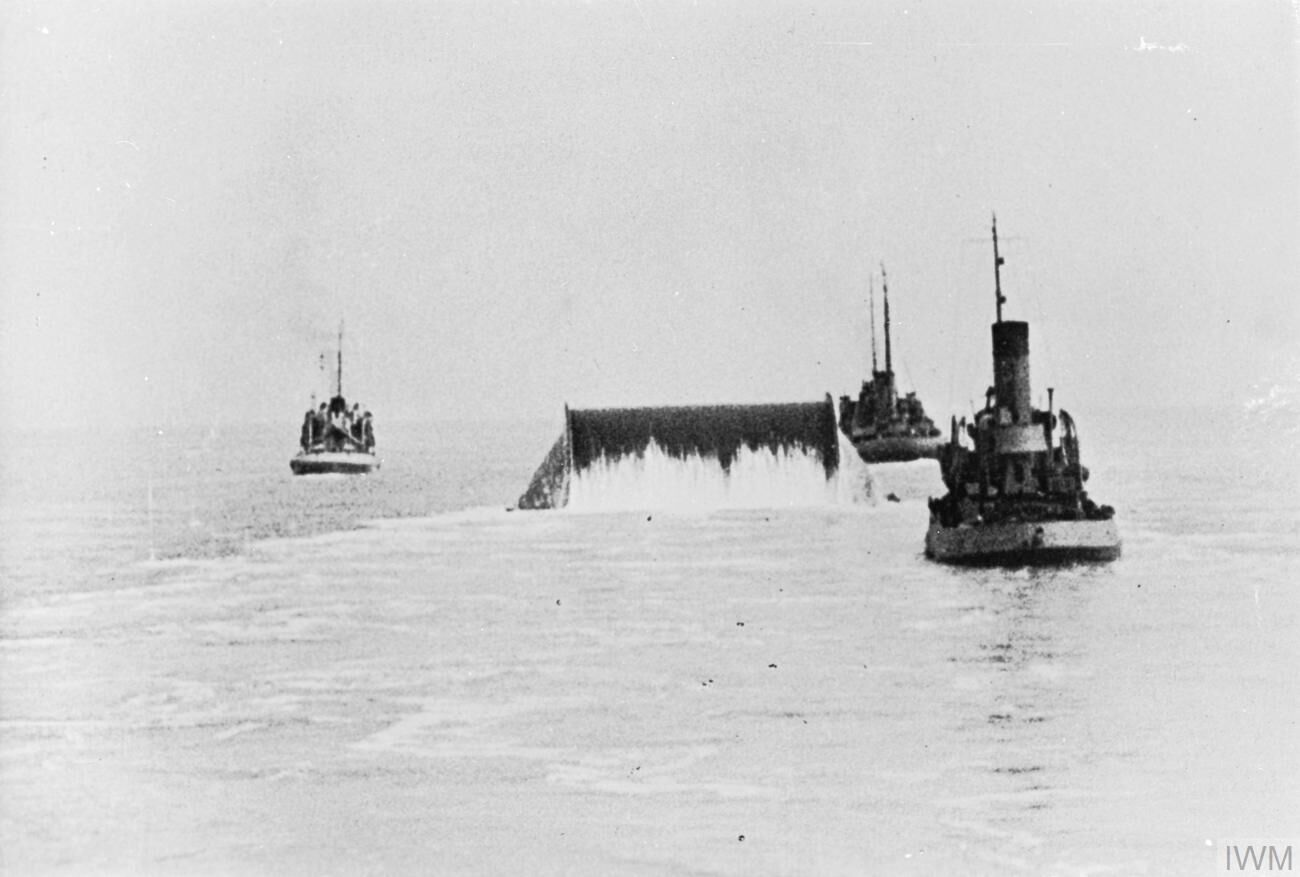
A Conundrum being towed across the English Channel laying out pipe behind it.
