= Pied Piper of Hamelin (disambiguation) =

The Pied Piper of Hamelin is a figure in German folklore.

Pied Piper of Hamelin may also refer to:

- The Pied Piper of Hamelin (1918 film), a German silent drama film
- The Pied Piper of Hamelin (1957 film), a made-for-television film starring Van Johnson in the title role
- The Pied Piper of Hamlin, a 1992 Australian animated film produced by Burbank Animation Studios
- "The Pied Piper of Hamelin", an 1842 narrative poem from Robert Browning's Dramatic Lyrics
- The Pied Piper of Hamelin (2011 novel), a children's novel by Michael Morpurgo
- The Pied Piper of Hamelin, a mural by Maxfield Parrish

== See also ==
- Violinist of Hameln, a manga series
- Der Rattenfänger von Hameln, an 1879 opera by Viktor Nessler
- Pied Piper (disambiguation)
- Hamelin (disambiguation)
