= Harmelin =

Harmelin is a surname. Notable people with the surname include:

- Alison Harmelin, American journalist, daughter of Stephen
- Stephen Harmelin (1939–2025), American lawyer
- Yossef Harmelin (1922–1994), Israeli civil servant, and ambassador

== See also ==
- Harmelin v. Michigan, a United States Supreme Court case
- Hamelin (disambiguation)
