= HMS Drake (shore establishment) =

Naval barracks for the Royal Navy

Coordinates: 50.3908°N 4.1834°W

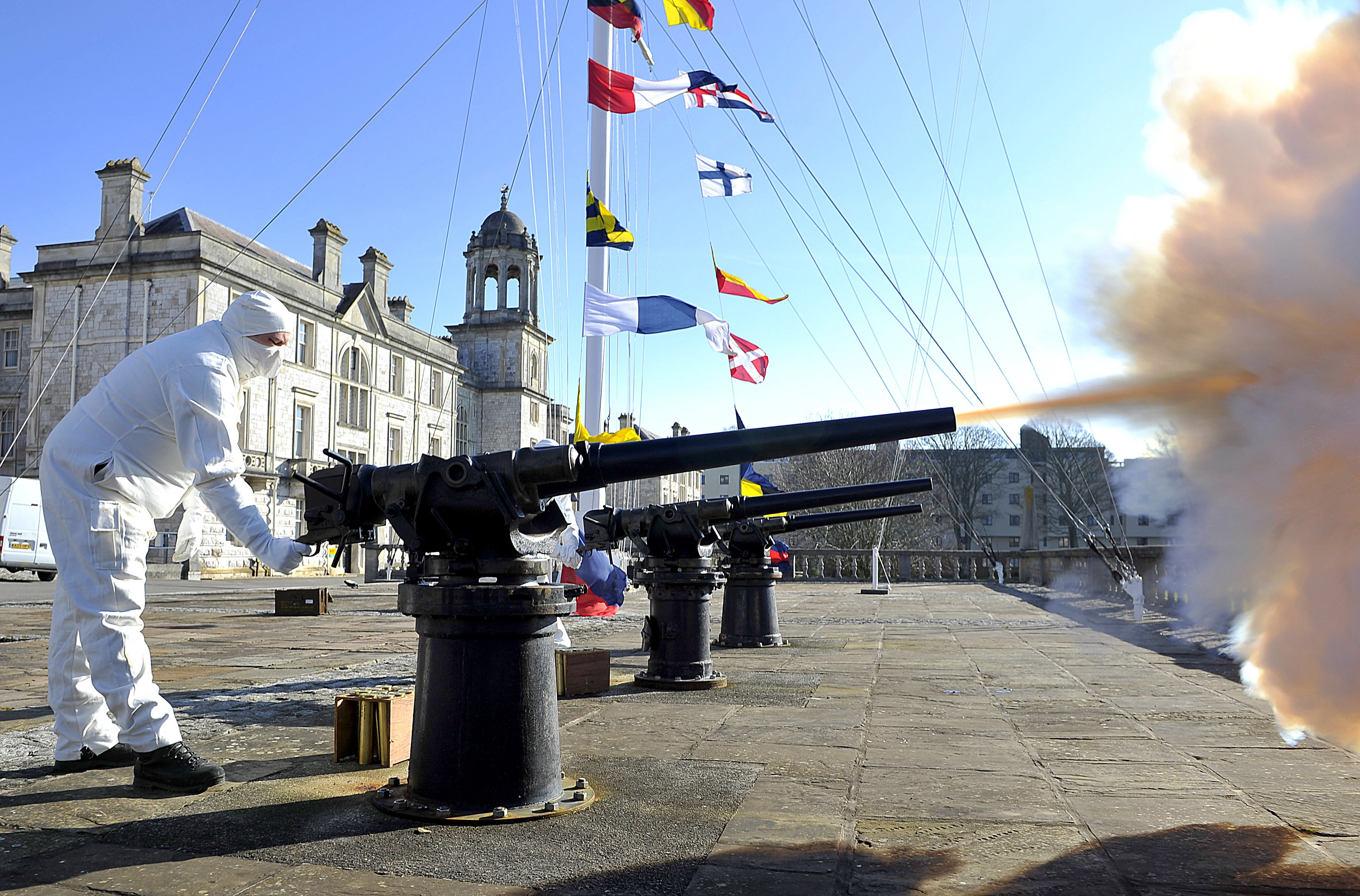
- A 21-gun salute being fired on the quarterdeck in front of the wardroom block in 2015
- Active: 1889 – present
- Country: United Kingdom
- Branch: Royal Navy
- Type: Barracks
- Role: Residential
- Part of: HMNB Devonport

HMS Drake, also known as the Fleet Accommodation Centre, is a stone frigate (shore establishment) of the Royal Navy on Saltash Road in Devonport, in the west of the city of Plymouth, England. It provides the naval barracks to support HMNB Devonport.

== History ==
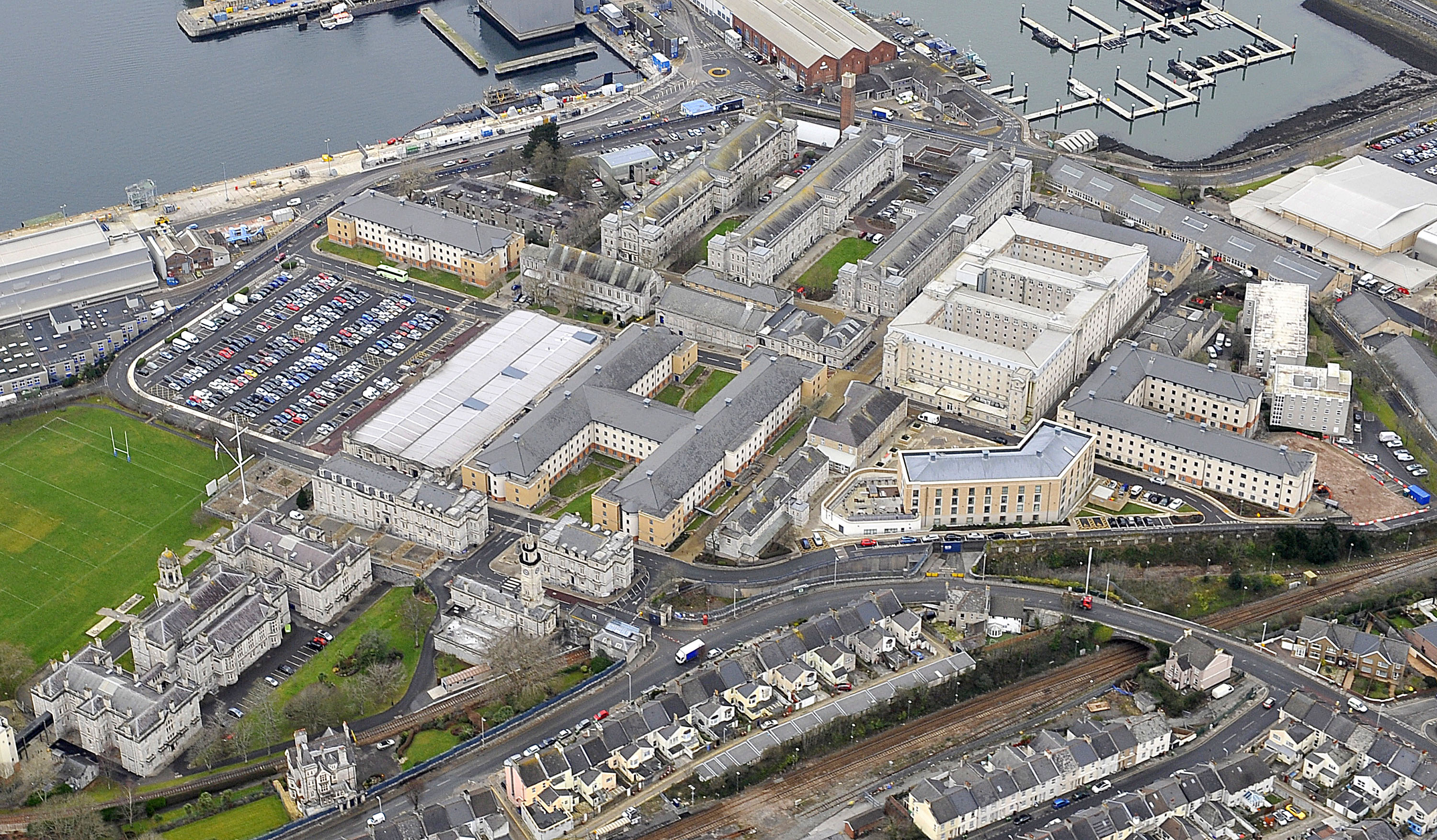
Aerial view of HMS Drake (the wardroom block is on the left)

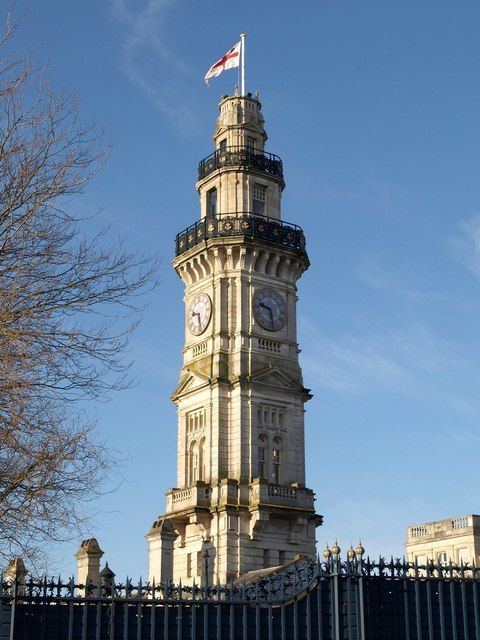
Clock tower, HMS Drake

Until the late nineteenth century, sailors whose ships were being repaired or refitted, or who were awaiting allocation to a vessel, were accommodated in floating hulks. Construction of an onshore barracks, just north-east of the North Yard, was completed in 1889, with the barracks being named "HMS Vivid", after the base ship of the same name. It could accommodate 2,500 sailors and officers, and the first personnel moved in during June of that year. In 1894 a contingent of sixty Royal Navy homing pigeons was accommodated on the site.

A prominent clock tower, with an attached gatehouse, was designed by Lieutenant-Colonel Percy Smith RE, built in limestone and completed in 1896. It contained a clock and bell by Gillett & Johnston, and initially functioned as a semaphore tower. 1898 saw the barracks expand to accommodate a further 1,000 men.

A wardroom block (with accommodation for officers) was built facing out on to the River Hamoaze. It was designed by Major Monro Wilson, RE in the neoclassical style, built in limestone and was completed in 1902. The design involved a seven bay central section facing into Queen Street. It featured a three stage entrance tower in the central bay: the first stage was blind with external staircases on either side; the second stage involved a tetrastyle portico formed by Tuscan order columns supporting an entablature; the third stage consisted of a two-storey window with a pediment, and the whole structure was surmounted by parapet and a cupola with Ionic order columns surmounted by a dome. There were oriel windows in the outer bays. Internally, the principal rooms included the entrance hall which was finely decorated.

More buildings were added in the early years of the twentieth century, including St Nicholas's Church. This part of the site contains some fourteen listed buildings and structures. The barracks were renamed HMS Drake on 1 January 1934. Following the handover of Hong Kong in 1997, three QF 3-pounder Hotchkiss naval guns, recovered from HMS Tamar, were installed on the quarterdeck in front of the wardroom block, and have subsequently been used for royal salutes and other special occasions.

In the early 21st century the barracks area remained part of HMNB Devonport, but was re-designated the Fleet Accommodation Centre. It remains in Ministry of Defence ownership.
