= HMS C34 =

Submarine of the Royal Navy

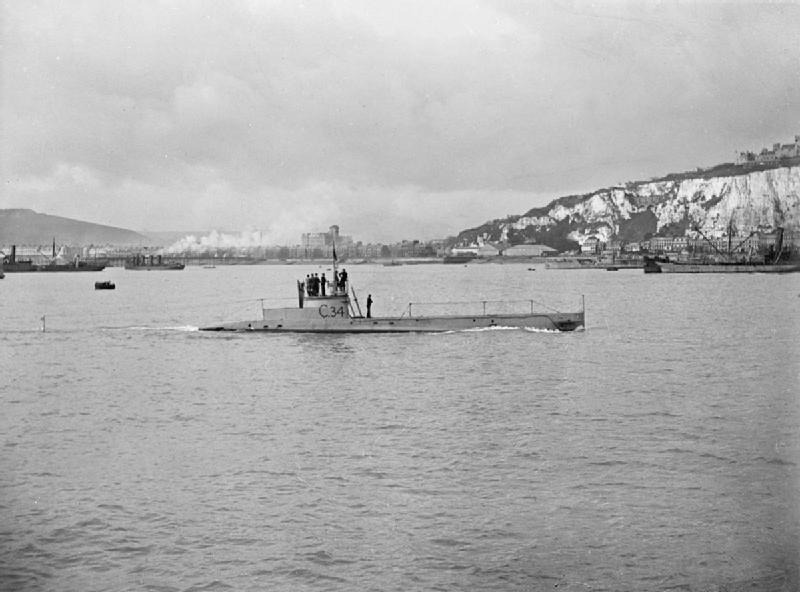
- HMS C34

History

United Kingdom
- Name: HMS C34
- Builder: HM Dockyard Chatham
- Laid down: 29 March 1909
- Launched: 8 June 1910
- Commissioned: 17 September 1910
- Fate: Sunk 17 July 1917

General characteristics
- Class & type: C-class submarine
- Displacement: 290 long tons (290 t) surfaced; 320 long tons (330 t) submerged
- Length: 142 ft 3 in (43.4 m)
- Beam: 13 ft 7 in (4.1 m)
- Draught: 11 ft 6 in (3.5 m)
- Installed power: 600 bhp (450 kW) petrol; 300 hp (220 kW) electric
- Propulsion: 1 × 16-cylinder Vickers petrol engine; 1 × electric motor
- Speed: 13 kn (24 km/h; 15 mph) surfaced; 8 kn (15 km/h; 9.2 mph) submerged
- Range: 910 nmi (1,690 km; 1,050 mi) at 12 kn (22 km/h; 14 mph) on the surface
- Test depth: 100 feet (30.5 m)
- Complement: 2 officers and 14 ratings
- Armament: 2 × 18 in (450 mm) bow torpedo tubes

HMS C34 was one of 38 C-class submarines built for the Royal Navy in the first decade of the 20th century. The boat was sunk by a German U-boat in 1917.

== Design and description ==
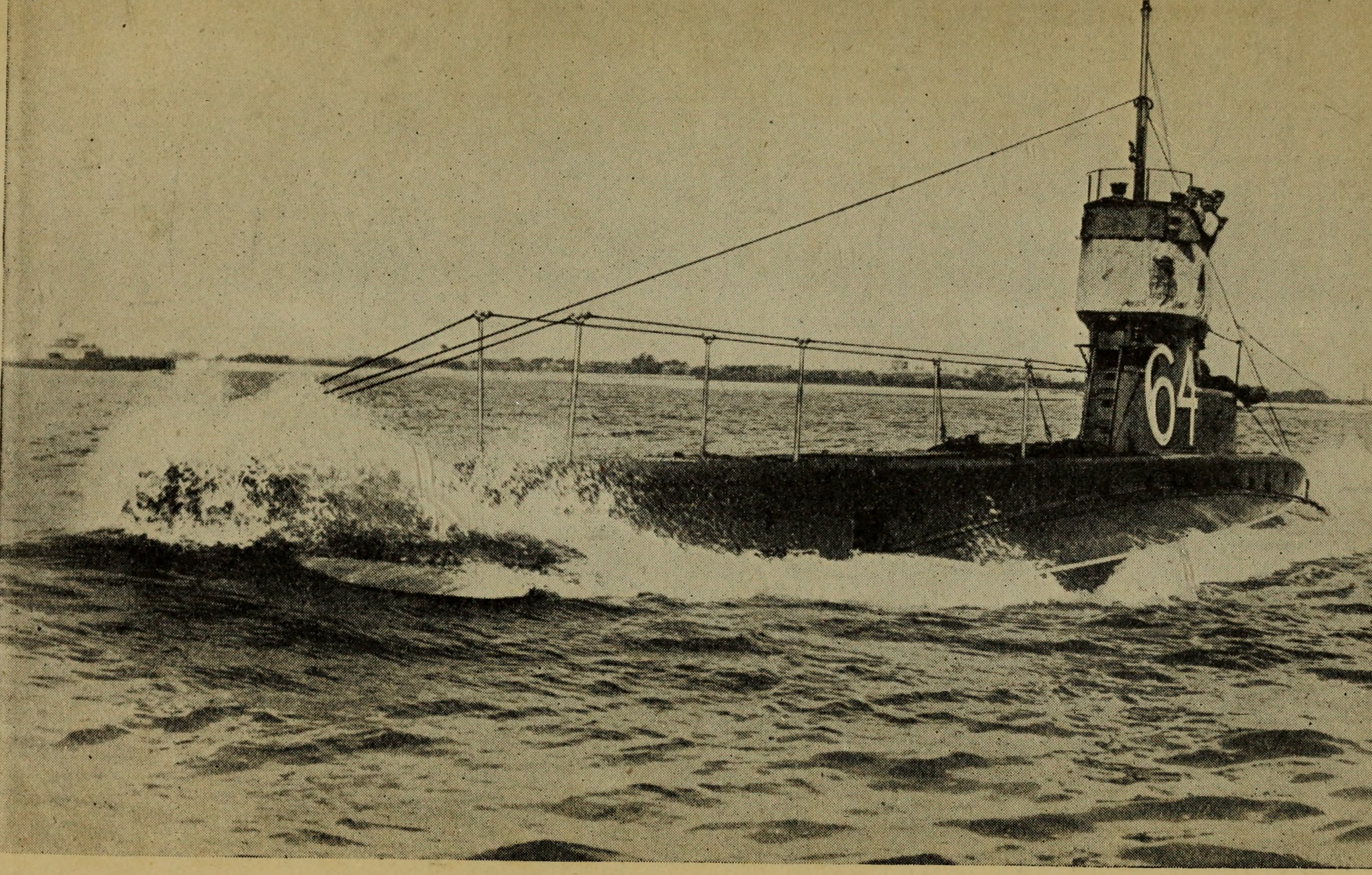
HMS C34

The C-class boats of the 1907–08 and subsequent Naval Programmes were modified to improve their speed, both above and below the surface. The submarine had a length of 142 feet 3 inches (43.4 m) overall, a beam of 13 feet 7 inches (4.1 m) and a mean draught of 11 feet 6 inches (3.5 m). They displaced 290 long tons (290 t) on the surface and 320 long tons (330 t) submerged. The C-class submarines had a crew of two officers and fourteen ratings.

For surface running, the boats were powered by a single 12-cylinder 600-brake-horsepower (447 kW) Vickers petrol engine that drove one propeller shaft. When submerged the propeller was driven by a 300-horsepower (224 kW) electric motor. They could reach 13 knots (24 km/h; 15 mph) on the surface and 8 knots (15 km/h; 9.2 mph) underwater. On the surface, the C class had a range of 910 nautical miles (1,690 km; 1,050 mi) at 12 knots (22 km/h; 14 mph).

The boats were armed with two 18-inch (45 cm) torpedo tubes in the bow. They could carry a pair of reload torpedoes, but generally did not as they would have to remove an equal weight of fuel in compensation.

== Construction and career ==
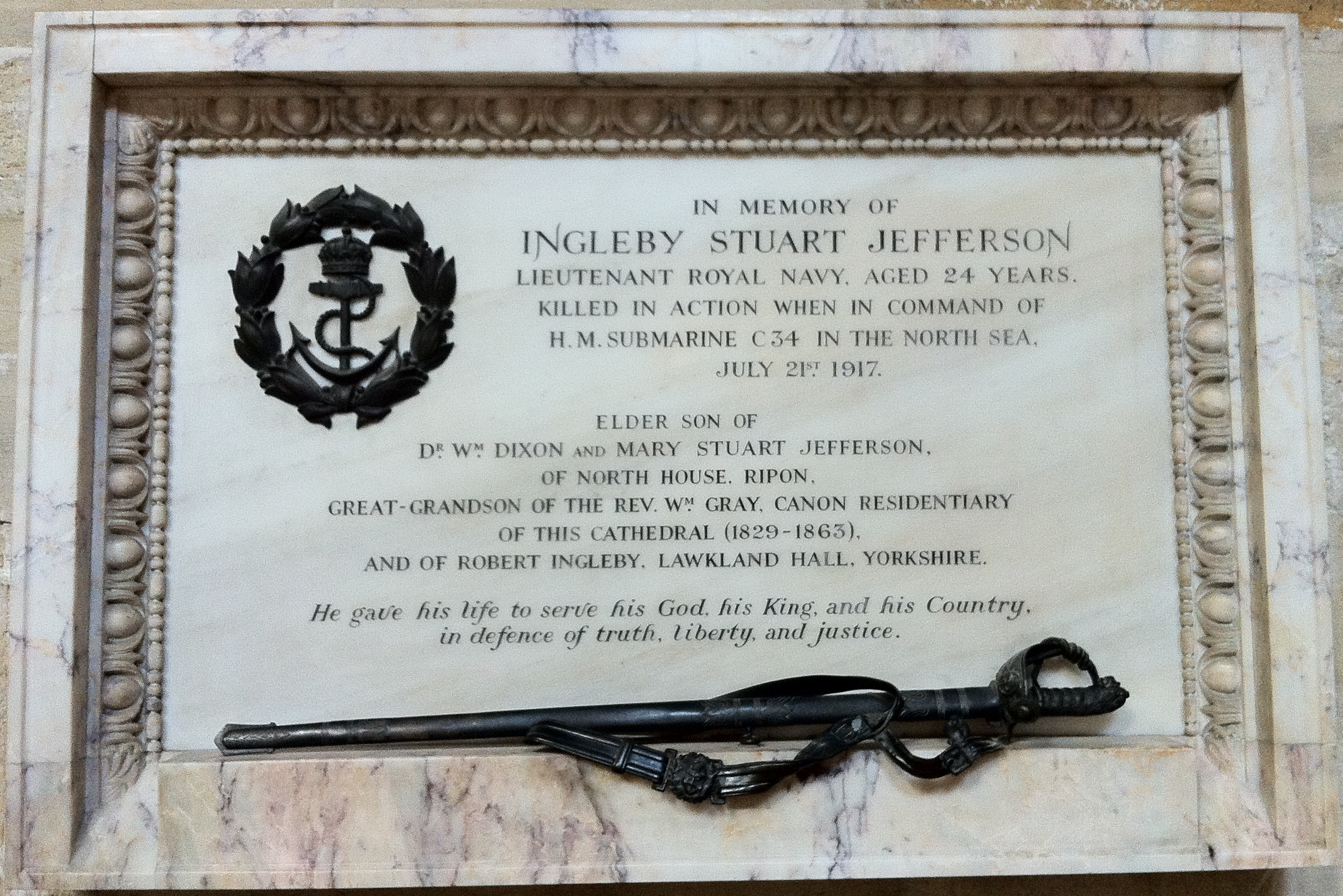
Memorial to Ingleby Stuart Jefferson in Ripon Cathedral

HMS C34 was built by HM Dockyard, Chatham for the Royal Navy. She was laid down on 29 March 1909 and was commissioned on 17 September 1910. The boat was sunk by the Imperial German Navy U-boat U-52 off Fair Isle in Shetland while on the surface on 17 July 1917. The only survivor was picked up by U-52.
