= John Hammel =

New Zealand cricketer

John Ernest Hammel (4 November 1940 in Wellington – 14 March 1983 in Wellington) was a New Zealand cricketer who played two first-class matches for the Wellington Firebirds in the Plunket Shield.
