= Mike Hamel =

American author (born 1952)

Mike Hamel (born 1952) is an American author. He has two in-print young adult novel series, Matterhorn the Brave and The Lighthouse Company, and the children's books, Lizzy the Leatherback and Queen Quillabee, illustrated by Julie Bergeron and Lady Allium, illustrated by Mae Danner with photographs by Mike Braun. Hamel has also written on a variety of topics, including cancer research, litigation, and financial matters, such as real estate loans, mortgages and credit consolidation.

In 2025, Hamel embarked on exploring what it means to build a civilization that advances forever — and what role entrepreneurs play in that project. The episodic Value Creators Podcast, has interviewed John Deming (author) and Mike Hamel (editor) about their book, Blueprint for a Spacefaring Civilization: The Science of Volition. Deming and Hamel frame markets, innovation and entrepreneurship through the lens of volitional science: a scientific approach to subjective value and long-term progress.

In 2026, Deming and Hamel started Progress Is A Choice, an organization dedicated to explaining and expanding the influence of the science of volition. The science of volition grew out of the intellectual flowstreams of physical science, classical liberalism, and Austrian economics. Its roots go back to the 1970s, when Deming attended a series of seminars taught by Andrew J. Galambos and his associates in what became the Free Enterprise Institute] (FEI).

== Biography ==
=== Career ===
Hamel has penned hundreds of articles on various themes, ranging in topics from Big Pharma to surviving cancer for such notable organizations as the Institute for Justice, which litigates liberty issues in the nation's highest courts. Hamel was himself an IJ plaintiff in a case that was won in Federal Court.

Hamel has also contributed to the internationally distributed Solutions Journal. He co-authored a book about trailblazing social entrepreneurs entitled, Powering Social Enterprise with Profit and Purpose: The-Tandem Hybrid, written in concert with colleagues, Scott Boyer and Jeremy Gudauskas. The book was released on March 1, 2023, published by Routledge.

Hamel was part of the founding of the ROW Foundation in 2015 and served as its first director of communications. The ROW Foundation provides treatment resources to people with epilepsy and associated psychiatric disorders. ROW also helps neurologists and psychiatrists in the developed world train practitioners in the developing world to more effectively treat epilepsy and associated psychiatric disorders. The foundation has received GuideStar's Platinum Seal of Transparency. Hamel wrote the book One World: One Standard, which outlines the foundation's mission and unique method of helping people in undeveloped regions of the world deal with epilepsy.

Hamel is a multi-time cancer survivor, having gone through two bone marrow transplants and multiple other treatments to fight lymphoma. He wrote about his experience in a seminal book that explores his journey from diagnosis to treatment to surviving, called Stumbling Toward Heaven. Hamel also produced a video series about his cancer journey in order to demystify the experience of cancer treatment.

In recommending Hamel's book, We Will Be Landing Shortly: Now What?, nationally renowned author and speaker, Brian D. McLaren, who was recognized by Time Magazine as one of the most influential evangelical leaders in the U.S. said, "I trust Mike Hamel's questions more than I trust most people's answers. I also trust his wisdom… a treasure which nobody gains without pain and struggle. It is a rare gift to enter into the thoughts of a good and wise man who faces something daily we all must face someday."

In We Will Be Landing Shortly: Now What? Hamel also explained how he turned the bedtime stories he had told his four children into Young Adult (YA) novels. He completed the decade-long effort, resulting in a YA novel series called Matterhorn the Brave, which was published in 2006 by Living Ink Books, an imprint of AMG Publishers. Each book in the series is set in a different location and time period and features a supporting cast of diverse characters, modeled after his own children. Matterhorn the Brave features four adolescents (ages 12–14) who are recruited by the Praetorians of First Realm — a mirror world of Earth — to keep an eye on the development of civilization. To do this, they time-travel through portals and physically mature to adulthood in the process. When heretics murder the king of First Realm, his daughter, Queen Bea, enlists the kids’ help to recover some of the Ten Talis hidden on Earth. The Talis were fashioned by The Maker as tangible symbols of his power. The heretics need these sacred objects for their scheme of taking over the Earth by rewriting its history.

The Pulitzer Prize winning daily newspaper, The Gazette, called Hamel's Matterhorn the Brave series "a blend of adventure, fantasy and science fiction. There are sword fights, a cast of characters that includes leprechauns, Sasquatch and merpeople, and time travel to various lands and centuries, accompanied by heady physics discussions of how it all works. He [Hamel] eschews interior monologue for action and dialogue and engaging the senses."

The book titles in the Matterhorn series are:

- Book 1 — The Sword and the Flute: Ireland, AD 700
- Book 2 — Talis Hunters: Pacific Northwest, 10,000 BC
- Book 3 — Pyramid Scheme: Egypt, 1325 BC
- Book 4 – Jewel Heist: Bermuda Triangle, AD 1292
- Book 5 – Dragon's Tale: China, 246 BC
- Book 6 – Rylan the Renegade: Greenland, AD 985
- Book 7 – Tunguska Event: Siberia, AD 1908 and Asia, 160 BC
- Book 8 – The Book of Stories: Chicago, AD 1983

Hamel went on to write The Lighthouse Company (TLC) book series, which chronicles a group of kids in the fictional Washington town of Cape Myra, near the Northwest tip of the continental U.S. They meet in the basement of the lighthouse run by Mr. Tyler, aka The Captain. His grandson, JJ, comes to live with him every summer and leads TLC in solving mysteries, finding treasures and helping Cape Myra's two-man police force. The book titles in the series are:

- UFO on the Rez
- Bezer's Billions
- Zack's Cavern
- The Long Walk Home
- The Green Bees
- Skeleton Crew
- Colorado Christmas
- Roll Cameras

The Matterhorn books fell out-of-print in 2015 and were picked up by pop culture development and publishing company, Pangea Corporation under their imprint Pangea Press. Both series, Matterhorn the Brave and TLC were released in the Fall of 2016. Because of Hamel's religious background and non-religious writing style, and his multi-volume alternate reality novels for children, he has been likened to "a 21st century C.S. Lewis.

=== Other books ===
- The Entrepreneur's Creed (Co-writer, Merrill J. Oster, 2001)
- Women's Ministry Handbook (Co-writer, Carol Porter, 1992)
- Giving Back: Using Your Influence to Create Social Change (Co-writer, Merrill J. Oster, 2003)
- Executive Influence: Impacting Your Workplace for Christ (Co-writer, Christopher Crane, 2003)
- Lizzy the Leatherback (Illustrated by Julie Bergeron, 2012)
- Spencer MacCallum: A Man Beyond His Time
- Lady Allium (Illustrated by Mae Danner; Photographs by Mike Braun, 2022)
- Alvin Lowi, Jr: American Polymath
- Powering Social Enterprise with Profit and Purpose: The Tandem Hybrid (Co-writer, Scott Boyer, 2023)
