= Hammel (surname) =

Hammel, also spelled Hammell, is a surname, and may refer to:

- Barry Hammel (born 1946, Hammel), American botanist
- Brian Hammel (born 1953), American college basketball coach
- Connor Hammell (born 1996), English footballer
- David Hammel (1838–1928), American businessman and politician
- Eric M. Hammel (1946–2020), military historian
- Heidi Hammel (born 1960), American astronomer
- Henry Hammel of the partnership Henry Hammel and Andrew H. Denker
- Henry A. Hammel (1840–1902), Union Army soldier and Medal of Honor recipient
- Howard Hammell (1896–1965), Canadian politician
- Jason Hammel, baseball pitcher
- Jason Hammel, drummer of the band Mates of State
- John Hammel (1940–1983), New Zealand cricketer
- Leif Hammel (born 1935), Danish racing cyclist
- Leopold Hammel (1858–1929), American lawyer and politician
- Pavol Hammel (born 1948), Slovak musician
- Penny Hammel (born 1962), American golfer
- Richard Hammel, American politician
- Steven Hammell (born 1982), Scottish retired footballer
- Sue Hammell (born 1945), Canadian politician
- Timo Hammel (born 1987), German footballer
- Todd Hammel, Arena Football League quarterback
- William Henry Hammell (1845–1937), Canadian politician
- William James Hammell (1881–1959), Canadian politician
- William A. Hammell, Chief of the Los Angeles Police Department (1904–1905)
