= Hammel (automobile) =

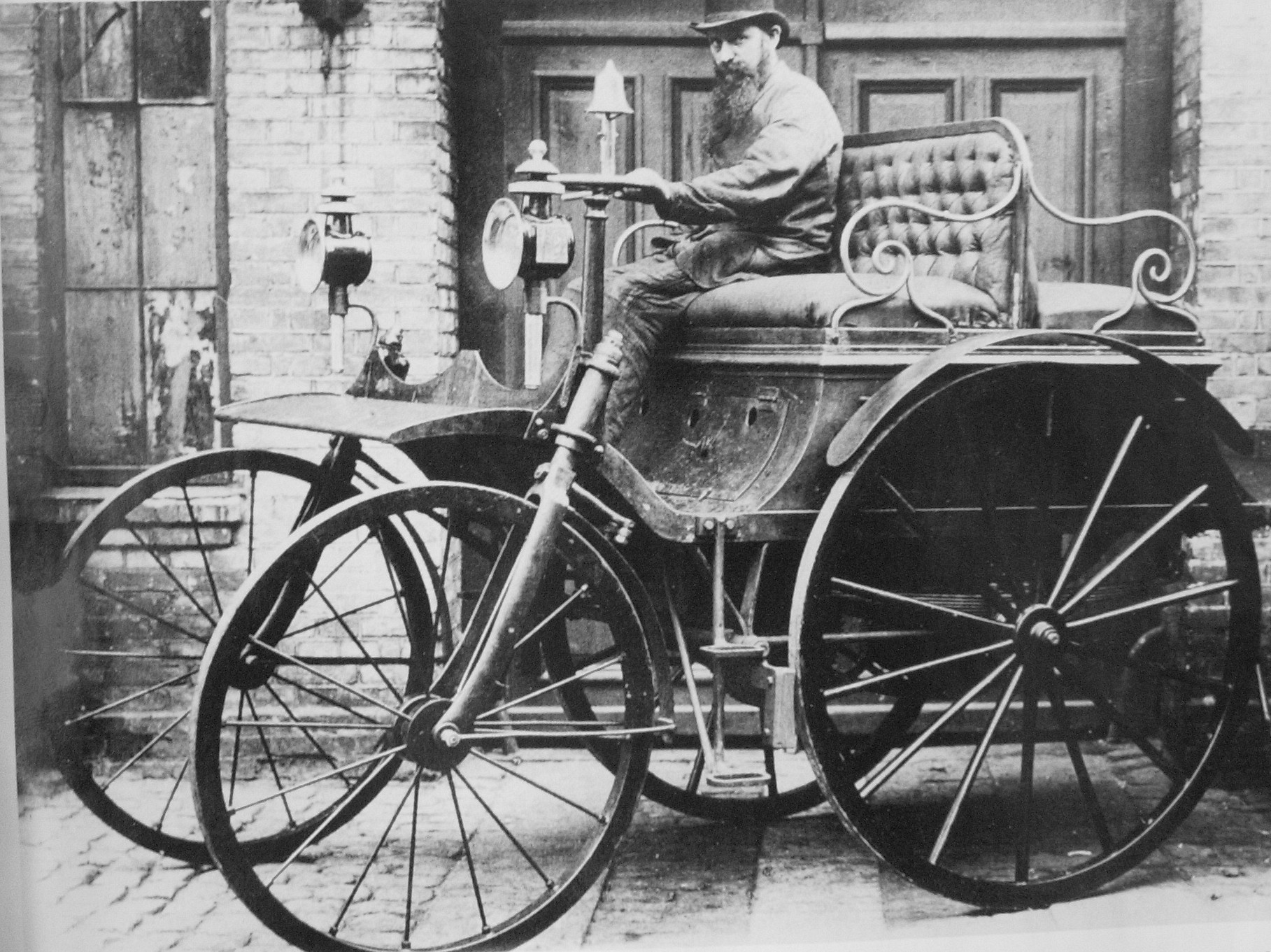
Hammel1 1888

The Hammel is an early car from Denmark, built by Urban Johansen und Albert F. Hammel. It is connected with some controversy regarding its exact year of construction. One claim is that it was introduced in 1886, making it one of the first motorcars in the world. Other sources mention the years between 1887 and 1890 as more probable. Only one was constructed. It has been restored and is exhibited in the Technological Museum in Helsingør. It is still functional, leading the Technical Museum to claim it as the "world's oldest running automobile", a title usually bestowed on La Marquise.
