= HMS Vivid (1848) =

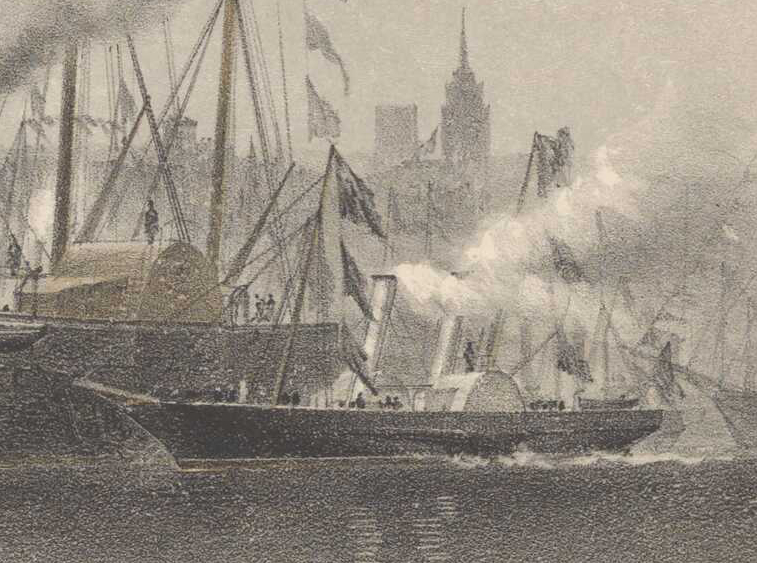
- HMS Vivid at Gravesend, 2 February 1858

History

United Kingdom
- Name: HMS Vivid
- Ordered: 4 February 1847
- Builder: Chatham Dockyard; Engines by John Penn and Sons
- Laid down: 5 January 1847
- Launched: 7 February 1848
- Completed: By 7 April 1848
- Fate: Sold in May 1894

General characteristics
- Class & type: wooden paddle sloop
- Tons burthen: 352 17/94 bm
- Length: 150 ft (45.7 m) (overall); 136 ft 9.5 in (41.7 m) (keel)
- Beam: 22 ft (6.7 m)
- Depth of hold: 11 ft 4 in (3.45 m)
- Installed power: 160 nhp; 832 ihp
- Armament: 2 guns

HMS Vivid was a wooden paddle steamer of the Royal Navy, launched in 1848 for service as an Admiralty packet ship between Dover and Calais. She became the tender to HMS Fisgard at Woolwich Dockyard from 1854 until 1871, and then the port admiral’s yacht and tender to HMS Royal Adelaide at Devonport in 1872.

In 1889 Vivid became the Devonport flagship. The name Vivid was used for the newly established Devonport Royal Navy Barracks from 1890 onwards. The paddle steamer HMS Vivid was sold for breaking up to G. Cowen & Sons in May 1894.
