= Van Hamel =

Van Hamel or Vanhamel is a surname. Notable people with the surname include:

- A. G. van Hamel (1886–1945), Dutch academic
- Mike Van Hamel (born 1989), Belgian footballer
- Tim Vanhamel (born 1977), Belgian rock musician
