= HMS A2 =

Submarine of the Royal Navy

History

United Kingdom
- Name: A2
- Builder: Vickers, Barrow-in-Furness
- Laid down: 1902
- Launched: 15 April 1903
- Completed: 26 March 1904
- Fate: Wrecked, January 1920; Sold for scrap, 22 October 1925

General characteristics
- Class & type: A-class submarine
- Displacement: 190 long tons (193 t) (surfaced); 206 long tons (209 t) (submerged)
- Length: 105 ft (32.0 m)
- Beam: 12 ft 9 in (3.9 m)
- Draught: 10 ft 8 in (3.3 m)
- Installed power: 450 bhp (340 kW) (petrol engine); 150 hp (110 kW) (electric motor)
- Propulsion: 1 × 16-cylinder Wolseley petrol engine; 1 × electric motor
- Speed: 10 knots (19 km/h; 12 mph) (surfaced); 7 knots (13 km/h; 8.1 mph) (submerged)
- Range: 320 nmi (590 km; 370 mi) at 10 knots (19 km/h; 12 mph) (surfaced)
- Complement: 2 officers and 9 ratings
- Armament: 2 × 18 in (45 cm) torpedo tubes

HMS A2 was an A-class submarine built for the Royal Navy in the first decade of the 20th century.

== Design and description ==
A2 was a member of the first British class of submarines, although slightly larger, faster and more heavily armed than the lead ship, HMS A1. The submarine had a length of 105 feet 1 inch (32.0 m) overall, a beam of 12 feet 9 inches (3.9 m) and a mean draught of 10 feet 8 inches (3.3 m). They displaced 190 long tons (190 t) on the surface and 206 long tons (209 t) submerged. The A-class submarines had a crew of 2 officers and 9 ratings.

For surface running, the boats were powered by a single 16-cylinder 450-brake-horsepower (336 kW) Wolseley petrol engine that drove one propeller shaft. When submerged the propeller was driven by a 150-horsepower (112 kW) electric motor. They could reach 10 knots (19 km/h; 12 mph) on the surface and 7 knots (13 km/h; 8.1 mph) underwater. On the surface, A2 had a range of 320 nautical miles (590 km; 370 mi) at 10 knots (19 km/h; 12 mph); submerged the boat had a range of 30 nautical miles (56 km; 35 mi) at 5 knots (9.3 km/h; 5.8 mph).

The boats were armed with two 18-inch (45 cm) torpedo tubes in the bow. They could carry a pair of reload torpedoes, but generally did not as in doing so they had to compensate for their weight by an equivalent weight of fuel.

== Construction and career ==
Like all boats in her class, she was built at Vickers, Barrow-in-Furness. Construction started in 1902 and the submarine was launched on 15 April 1903 and completed on 26 March 1904. During World War I, A2 served on harbour service at Portsmouth. She flooded after running aground in Bomb Ketch Lake in Portsmouth Harbour in January 1920 and was sold for scrap to H. G. Pound of Portsmouth on 22 October 1925.
