= Pied (disambiguation) =

Pied or piebald is an animal spotting pattern.

Pied may also refer to:

- Pied (act), being hit, traditionally in the face, with a pie
- Jérémy Pied (born 1989), French footballer
- Pied de roi, commonly shortened to pied, one of the traditional French units of measurement before the French Revolution
- Pied Piper of Hamelin
