= Hamelin (bishop) =

13th-century French bishop

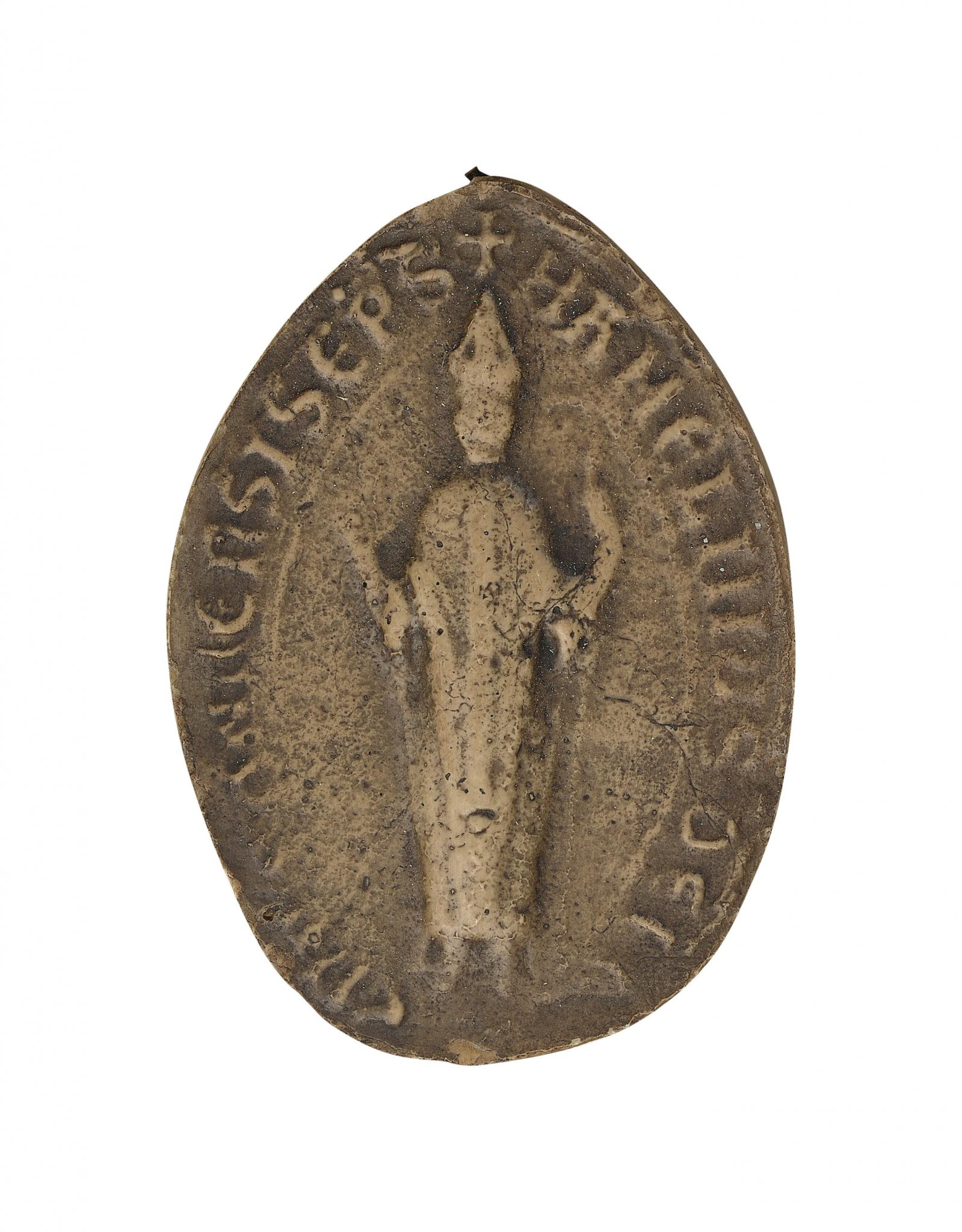
- Seal of Bishop Hamelin, taken from the work of DOUET D'ARCQ L., Archives de l'Empire. Inventaires et documents publiés par ordre de l'Empereur. Collection de sceaux, Paris, 1865 , n° 6685

Bishop of Le Mans (1190-1214)

Hamelin, bishop of Le Mans from 1190 to 1214, was a pragmatic and opportunistic figure in the complex relations between the Plantagenet and Capetian dynasties.

== Biographical details ==
His episcopal career spanned a period of political transition marked by upheaval, where links with the kings were more the result of personal relationships than institutionalised loyalty.

From the start of his episcopate, Hamelin was confronted with the turbulent succession of the Plantagenets, from Richard the Lionhearted to John Lackland. His resolute attitude towards John, even as a loyal follower of his predecessors, demonstrated the esprit de corps within the episcopate, opposing the king's cruelty towards his nephew Arthur. When Philip Augustus took control of Maine in 1202, Hamelin initially refused to pay homage, but eventually bowed to the seizure of his revenues.

Hamelin's relations with Rome were relatively peaceful, and he even received important missions from the Holy See, a sign of the trust placed in him by Rome. His episcopal government was in line with the Gregorian reform, where he worked alongside influential figures such as Adam de Perseigne and promoted ecclesiastical reforms.

Despite the influence of the Plantagenets on Maine, Hamelin managed to maintain a degree of autonomy and pragmatic thinking in his relations with them, as well as with the Capetians. His middle-of-the-road attitude reflects the complexity of relations between bishops and temporal powers, where personal interests and political considerations often took precedence over institutional loyalties.
