= Edith Hamel =

Canadian neurologist

Edith Hamel is a retired Canadian neuroscientist researching the various interactions between neurons, astrocytes and microvessels which enable a proper blood supply to activated brain areas and the various neurological conditions that arise from an impaired functioning of the system.

== Research ==
Hamel has her lab at Montreal Neurological Institute and Hospital (a venture of McGill University), where she utilizes various brain imaging techniques to map changes in neuronal and hemodynamic responses under varying physiological and pathological conditions and thus determine the mediators of these responses. Other aims include deciphering the mechanisms of local cerebral perfusion and understanding its alterations in Alzheimer's disease, dementia to develop novel therapeutic targets or drugs. Her research has also detailed the mechanisms of action of specific anti-migraine drugs and of memory-benefits of cardiovascular therapies in Alzheimer's disease and vascular dementia.

== Honors ==
In 2017 she was elected Fellow of the Royal Society of Canada.
