= Hammel and Millgrove, Ohio =

Extinct towns in Ohio, U.S.

Coordinates: 39°23′09″N 84°05′22″W

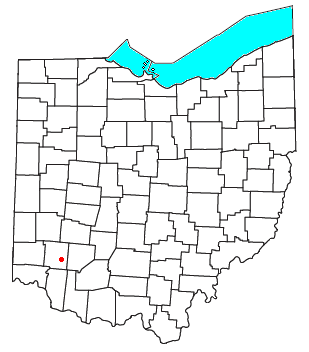
Location of Hammel and Millgrove, Ohio

Hammel and Millgrove are extinct towns in western Warren County, Ohio, United States. The towns were located along the Little Miami River, about 2 miles (3 km) south of Fort Ancient and 1 mile (1½ km) north of Roachester at the Strout Road crossing of the river. Hammel lies on the eastern shore of the river, in southwestern Washington Township, and Millgrove lies on the western shore of the river, in northeastern Salem Township. The GNIS considers Hammel to be a ghost town.

== History ==
Hammel had its start in the 1840s when the railroad was extended to that point. The community was named after its founder.
