= Hamlin =

Hamlin may refer to:

== Places ==
=== United States ===
- Hamlin, Iowa, a city
- Hamlin, Kansas, a city
- Hamlin, Kentucky, a town
- Hamlin, Maine, a town
- Hamlin, Michigan, a former community
- Hamlin, New York, a town
  - Hamlin (CDP), New York, a census-designated place in the town
- Hamlin, Wayne County, Pennsylvania, a village
- Hamlin, Texas, a city
- Hamlin, West Virginia, a town
- Hamlin County, South Dakota
- Hamlin Township (disambiguation), several U.S. townships
- Hamlin Peak, on Mount Katahdin in Maine
- Hamlin Reservation, Massachusetts, a nature reserve
- Hamlin Valley, near the Nevada–Utah state line

=== Canada ===
- Hamlin, Alberta, Canada, an unincorporated community
- Hamlin, Saskatchewan, Canada, an unincorporated community

== People ==
=== Given name ===
- Hamlin Garland (1860–1940), American writer
- Hamlin R. Harding (fl. 1860s–1870s), American politician

== Other ==
- USS Hamlin, the name of two U.S. Navy ships: an escort carrier and a seaplane tender
- Hamlin, a variety or cultivar of Valencia orange fruit
- Hamlin, an early maker of cable converter boxes

== See also ==
- Hamelin (disambiguation)
- Hamblin (disambiguation)
- Pied Piper of Hamelin
- Homlin
