= Hamblin =

Hamblin may refer to:

== People ==
- Hamblin (surname)
- Thomas Sowerby Hamblin, British actor and theatre manager
- Henry Thomas Hamblin, British author
- Robert W. Hamblin, professor and author
- Hamblin González, Nicaraguan cyclist

== Places ==
- Hamblin, Utah
- Hamblin Bay, in Lake Mead

== See also ==
- Lee–Hamblin family
- Hamlin (disambiguation)
