= Center for Faulkner Studies =

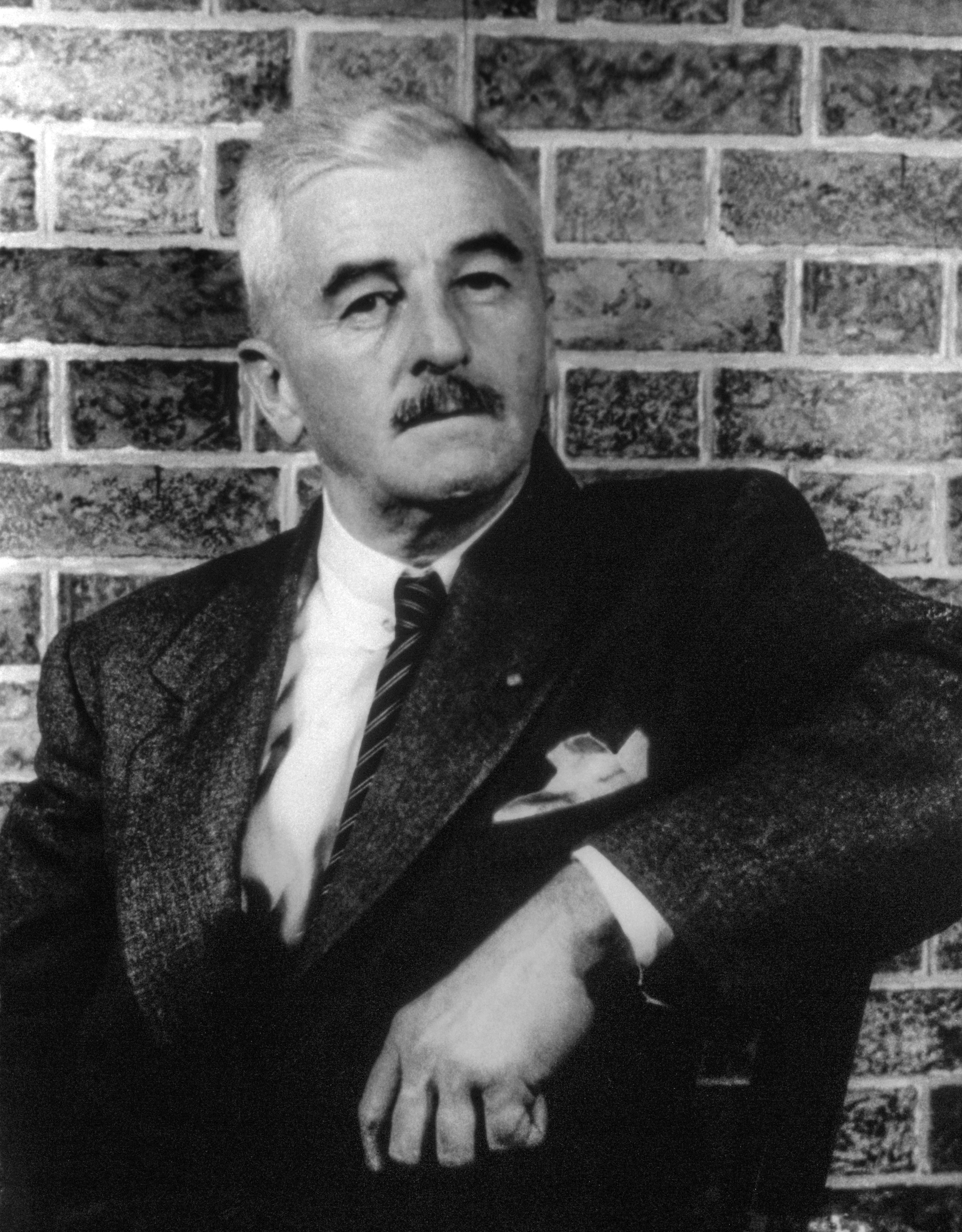
William Faulkner

The Center for Faulkner Studies (CFS) is a research center located at Southeast Missouri State University. It is devoted to the study of the life and works of William Faulkner (1897–1962), the American author who was awarded the Nobel Prize for Literature in 1950. The Center was established in 1989, after the university acquired the Louis Daniel Brodsky collection of Faulkner materials. The founding director of the CFS is Robert W. Hamblin, now Professor Emeritus of English at Southeast. He worked with Brodsky starting in 1979 to produce books, articles, lectures, and exhibits based on the materials in the collection. Dr. Christopher Rieger, Professor of English at Southeast, took Dr. Hamblin's place as the Center's director in 2013. Dr. Hamblin is now a volunteer consultant for the Center.

== Brodsky ==
Louis Daniel Brodsky, a native of St. Louis, first studied Faulkner's novels and stories in 1959 as a student in R. W. B. Lewis's course in American Studies at Yale University. Shortly thereafter, with the help of New Haven book dealer Henry Wenning, he began to acquire first editions and inscribed copies of Faulkner's books. Over the next 30 years, Brodsky expanded his Faulkner holdings to include manuscripts, letters, movie scripts, legal documents, photographs, and drawings. The story of the Brodsky Collection and its acquisition by Southeast Missouri State University is recounted in Nicholas Basbanes' A Gentle Madness, which presents a number of noted contemporary book collectors.

Brodsky was also a noted Faulkner scholar and poet. He was the author of William Faulkner: Life Glimpses, a collection of biographical essays, and he is co-editor, with Robert W. Hamblin, of the five-volume Faulkner: A Comprehensive Guide to the Brodsky Collection, plus three additional volumes based upon materials in the collection. Brodsky also published more than 70 volumes of poetry, three of which -Mississippi Vistas, Disappearing in Mississippi Latitudes, and Mistress Mississippi – deal with Faulknerian themes, settings, and characters. His other poems include a five-volume series, Shadow War, treating the events and aftermath of the September 11 terrorist attacks on the United States; You Can't Go Back, Exactly, which won the 2004 Award for the Best Book of Poetry from the Center for Great Lakes Culture at Michigan State University; and Still Wandering in the Wilderness: Poems of the Jewish Diaspora. Louis Daniel Brodsky died in June 2014. A complete list of his poetry volumes can be found at the Time Being Books website. Brodsky's personal website includes a number of his Faulkner publications.

== Programs and conferences ==
The Center regularly hosts visits from Chinese scholars studying Faulkner. Every two years the CFS hosts a conference on Faulkner and another writer. The 2006 conference featured Faulkner and Mark Twain, the 2008 conference focused on Faulkner and Kate Chopin, and the 2010 conference featured Faulkner and Toni Morrison. The 2012 conference was dedicated to Faulkner and Robert Penn Warren while the 2014 conference was dedicated to Faulkner and Zora Neale Hurston. The 2016 conference featured Faulkner and Ernest Hemingway. The proceedings of these conferences are published by Southeast Missouri State University Press. The center selects submitted essays from Faulkner scholars who have presented at the most recent conference. Those essays are then published in the center's book on the conference. The Faulkner Center publishes the Teaching Faulkner newsletter, which provides a network of information for high school, college, and university teachers of Faulkner's works. Along with publishing their newsletter, the CFS offers free massive open online courses.
