= Shamblin =

Shamblin is a surname. Notable people with the surname include:

- Andy Shamblin, American politician
- Allen Shamblin, American country songwriter
- Eldon Shamblin (1916–1998), American guitarist and music arranger
- Gwen Shamblin (1955–2021), American writer, conservative activist, and pastor

== See also ==
- Hamblin (surname)
