= James Hamlyn =

James Hamlyn may refer to:

- Sir James Hamlyn, 1st Baronet (1735–1811)
- Sir James Hamlyn-Williams, 2nd Baronet (1765–1829)
- Sir James Hamlyn-Williams, 3rd Baronet (1790–1861)

== See also ==
- James Hamlin, American military officer, businessman, and politician
- James H. Hamlin, member of the Wisconsin State Assembly
- Hamlyn (disambiguation)
