= Robert Hamblin =

Robert Hamblin may refer to:

- Robert W. Hamblin (born 1938), poet and author
- Robert A. Hamblin, visual artist
