= Hamlin Township, Michigan =

Hamlin Township is the name of some places in the U.S. state of Michigan:

- Hamlin, Raisinville Township, Michigan, a former community
- Hamlin Township, Eaton County, Michigan
- Hamlin Township, Mason County, Michigan

== See also ==
- Hamlin Township (disambiguation)
