= Judith Bumpus =

British radio producer (1939–2010)

- Born: Judith Harriet Collison; 3 November 1939; Savernake, Wiltshire, U.K.
- Died: 2 March 2010 (aged 70); Camden, London, U.K.
- Occupations: Writer, journalist, radio producer

Judith Harriet Bumpus (née Collison, 3 November 1939 – 2 March 2010) was a British radio producer for the BBC, specialising in coverage of the arts, particularly the work of visual artists.

== Early life and education ==
Judith Collison was born in Savernake, Wiltshire, and raised in London, the daughter of Robert Lewis Wright Collison and Patricia Dawes Marshall Collison. Her father was a librarian and her mother was an educator. She was educated at the University of St Andrews, where she read German and Spanish, and at universities in Barcelona and Madrid. Late in life, she began doctoral studies in art history at Birkbeck College.

== Career ==
Bumpus was a junior curator at the Victoria and Albert Museum from 1963 to 1968. She joined the BBC in 1968. For nearly thirty years, she worked on arts documentaries, mainly broadcast on Radio 3. She produced the long-running Conversations with Artists series, featuring interviews conducted by the poet and art critic Edward Lucie-Smith. She also produced radio dramas, including the 1985 adaptation of The Amazing Adventures of Baron Munchausen. She wrote books on Vincent van Gogh, gardens, and Elizabeth Blackadder, among other topics.

Bumpus retired from the BBC in 1996, but continued an active writing career. She donated her audio archive to British Library in 1997. Her contributions to New Makers of Modern Culture (2013) were published posthumously.

== Publications ==
- "Books for Babies" (1969, Library Review)
- "Rope Environments" (1974, Art and Artists)
- Elizabeth Blackadder (1988)
- Van Gogh's Flowers (1989)
- Impressionist Gardens (1990)
- Entries on Gillian Ayres, Elizabeth Blackadder, Maria Blanchard, Sandra Blow, Dictionary of Women Artists (1997)
- Reginald Brill (1999)
- "Art Smuggler, Police Informer and Self-styled Crusader: The Ambivalent World of Michel van Rijn Comes under the Spotlight" (2005, The Art Newspaper)
- "Saudis See How Their Sisters Live" (2006, Times Online)
- Entries on Elisabeth Frink, Damien Hirst, Anselm Kiefer, and R. B. Kitaj, New Makers of Modern Culture (2013)

== Personal life ==
Judith Collison married the historian of ceramics Bernard Bumpus in 1966; the couple had two daughters, Nicola and Francesca. Her husband died in 2004, and Bumpus died from cancer in 2010, at the age of 70, at her home in Camden. John Drummond recalled her as "a highly gifted woman".
