= Defense Information School =

DoD school located at Fort Meade, Maryland, US

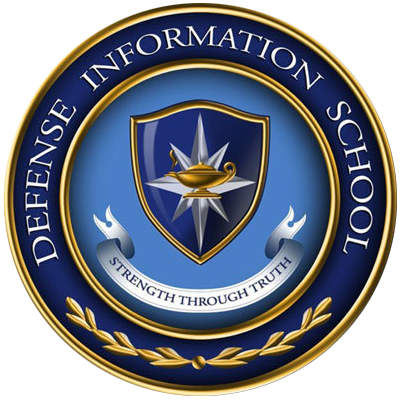

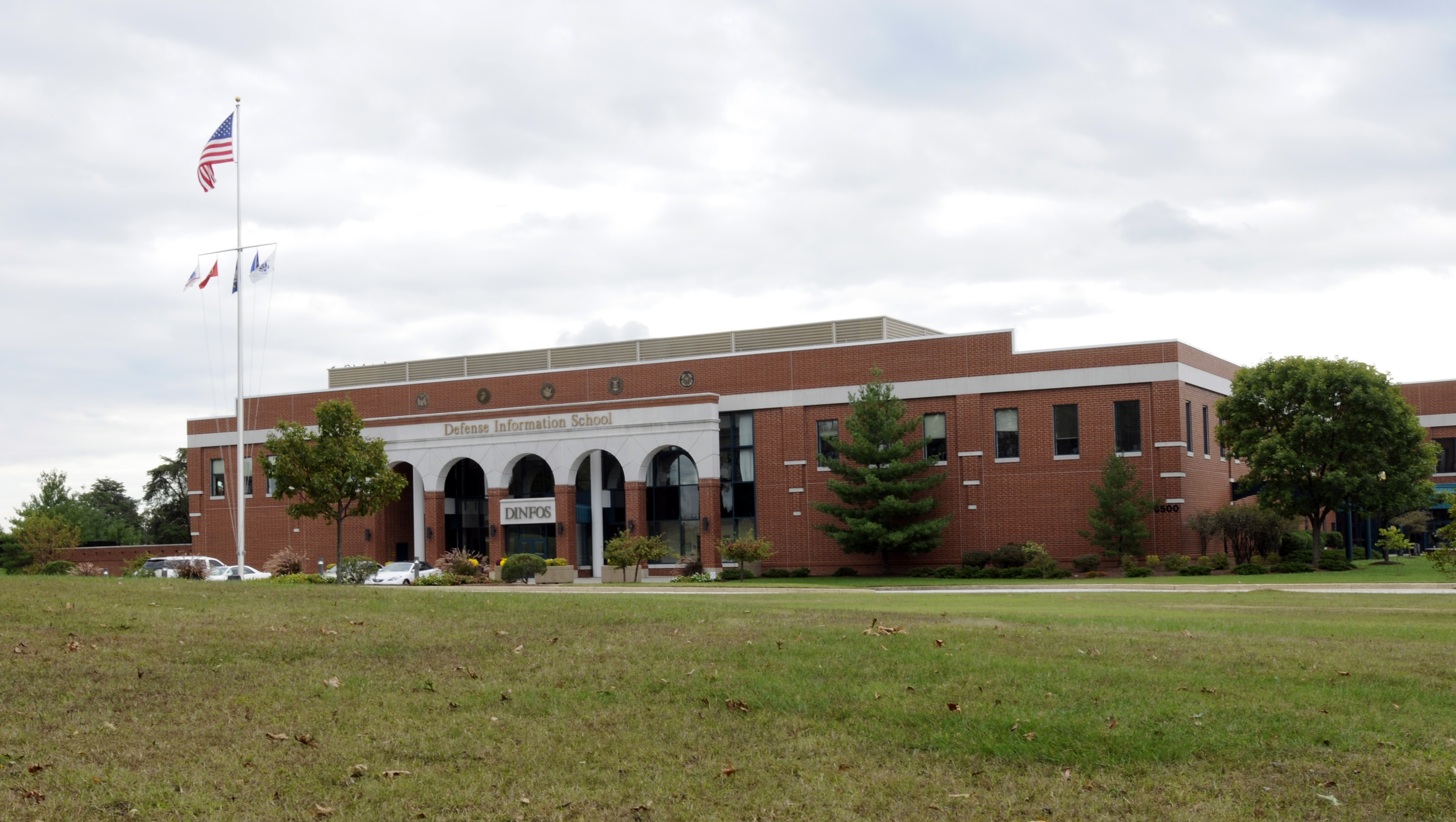

Agency overview
- Formed: January 1946
- Headquarters: Fort George G. Meade, Maryland, U.S.; 39.0979°N 76.7498°W
- Motto: "Strength Through Truth"
- Agency executive: Colonel Richard McNorton, Commandant
- Parent agency: Defense Media Activity
- Website: www.dinfos.dma.mil

The Defense Information School (DINFOS) is a United States Department of Defense (DoD) school located at Fort George G. Meade, Maryland. DINFOS fulfills the Department of Defense's need for an internal corps of professional journalists, broadcasters, and public affairs professionals. Members from all branches of the U.S. military, DoD civilians and international military personnel attend DINFOS for training in public affairs, print journalism, photojournalism, photography, television and radio broadcasting, lithography, equipment maintenance and various forms of multimedia. Since 1995, DINFOS has been accredited by the Council on Occupational Education. The American Council on Education recommends college credit for most DINFOS courses.

== History ==
The Army Information School was founded in 1946 at Carlisle Barracks in Carlisle, Pennsylvania. Other branches of the military merged with the Army Information School in 1948 to form the Armed Forces Information School at Fort Slocum, New York. The joint service venture disbanded due to poor enrollment until 1964, when Assistant Secretary of Defense for Public Affairs Arthur Sylvester chartered DINFOS. DINFOS moved to Fort Benjamin Harrison, just outside Indianapolis, Indiana, in 1965 where it remained until its 1995 move to Fort George G. Meade, Maryland.

== Training ==
=== Leadership courses ===
The Public Affairs Leadership Department is one of four departments in DINFOS.

The Public Affairs Leadership Department offers the Qualification Course (PAQC), the Joint Expeditionary Course (JEPAC), the Joint Intermediate Course (JIPAC), and the Joint Senior Course (JSPAC). Courses are offered to military officers, senior enlisted personnel, Department of Defense civilians, and members of coalition partners from around the world who are preparing for or already in billets of public affairs leadership.

The Public Affairs Qualification Course (PAQC) provides those who are new to the public affairs field with the fundamentals of public affairs including military-media relations, the different media used to facilitate the flow of accurate and timely information, and how to conduct public affairs operations in support of the command's mission. In addition, the students are taught the fundamentals of news, journalism, and how to write and copy-edit in accordance with the Associated Press (AP) Styleguide.

The Public Affairs Expeditionary Course is a ten-day, intensive follow-on course to PAQC. Students are expected to have a basic working knowledge and experience in PA as the course is focused more on the application of PA skills in a field environment.

=== Journalism courses ===
Journalism classes feature basic writing skills and include a headline style known at the school as "headline-ese," a style for writing and developing headlines. Students are taught a variety of writing styles and formats such as news, sports and feature writing.

Photojournalism courses focus on composition, exposure and general camera operation skills. Flash photography is introduced in the basic photography course. Students learn advanced photo-editing, composition and other techniques not taught in basic photojournalism classes.

For military journalists, DINFOS offers the 6-month Mass Communication Fundamentals Course (MCF), two-week Intermediate Public Affairs Specialist Course (IPASC) and four-week Content Management Course. U.S. Army students are awarded the Military Occupational Specialty (MOS) designator of 46S, Mass Communications Specialist, U.S. Air Force students are awarded the Air Force Specialty Code (AFSC) 3N0X6, Public Affairs, and U.S. Marine Corps students are awarded the MOS 4500 Communication and Multi Media Specialist

For military Broadcast journalists, DINFOS offers the Broadcast Communication Specialist Course. Broadcasters begin by attending several weeks of BWAS - Basic Writing and Announcing Skills. If the class requirements are met, students may continue into Radio and Television broadcasting classes.

Students in all courses hail from all branches of the U.S. military and Reserve as well as international military students.

=== Equipment maintenance courses ===
The Basic Television Equipment Maintenance (BTVEM) course includes apprentice-level instruction in the repair of all types of studio and transmission equipment. Students also learn how to maintain the Adobe Premiere non-linear digital editing systems. The U.S. Army MOS 25R is awarded upon completion. Since December 2006 Air Force class graduated, DINFOS no longer trains Air Force personnel in the BTVEM course.

The Broadcast Radio and Television Systems Maintenance course is an advanced-level course where students learn the ins and outs of American Forces Radio and Television Service (AFRTS) engineering standards and practices.

Both maintenance courses are nationally accredited by the Society of Broadcast Engineers (SBE). Upon completion of either course with an average GPA of at least 85%, students are certified by the SBE as broadcast technologists (CBT).

== Notable alumni ==
- Walter F. Mondale, former vice-president of the United States.
- JD Vance Vice President of the United States
- Rob Riggle, Actor/comedian
- Dale Dye Veteran and movie star
- Lionel Bascom, Pulitzer Prize juror in Journalism, Columbia University
- Adrian Cronauer AFVN American Forces Vietnam Network disc jockey, movie author of "Good Morning, Vietnam", attorney
- Zsa Zsa Gershick
- Gustav Hasford, marine and novelist
- Chas Henry
- LouAnne Johnson
- Clarence Page
- Rod Simmons
- Marshall Thompson
- James E. Whaley, Siemens Corporation, Vice President of Communications & Marketing
- Earl Woods, father of golfer Tiger Woods
- Mark Rosenker, Retired USAFR Major General, CBS NEWS Transportation Safety Analyst
- Major Megan McClung
- Gene Siskel, Chicago movie reviewer
- Tony Dow, Leave It to Beaver
- John William Chancellor, former NBC television news anchor and author
- Nicholas A. Basbanes, author of numerous works of nonfiction, including A Gentle Madness: Bibliophiles, Bibliomanes, and the Eternal Passion for Books and On Paper: The Everything of Its Two-Thousand-Year History; Spring 1968.
- Sunny Anderson,
- Jonathan Young (psychologist), commentator, Ancient Aliens series on the History Channel.
- Geoff Ramsey, voice actor, film producer, and internet personality, co-founder of Rooster Teeth and Achievement Hunter
