= Outwitting History =

2004 memoir by Aaron Lansky

Outwitting History: The Amazing Adventures of a Man Who Rescued a Million Yiddish Books
- Author: Aaron Lansky
- Language: English
- Genre: memoir
- Publisher: Algonquin Books
- Publication date: 2004
- Publication place: United States
- Pages: 328
- Awards: Massachusetts Book Award
- ISBN: 9781565124295
- OCLC: 1298731404

Outwitting History: The Amazing Adventures of a Man Who Rescued a Million Yiddish Books by Aaron Lansky is a memoir published by Algonquin Books in 2004. It was the recipient of the 2005 Massachusetts Book Award. The book is about the author's efforts to rescue a large number of books in the Yiddish language from destruction.

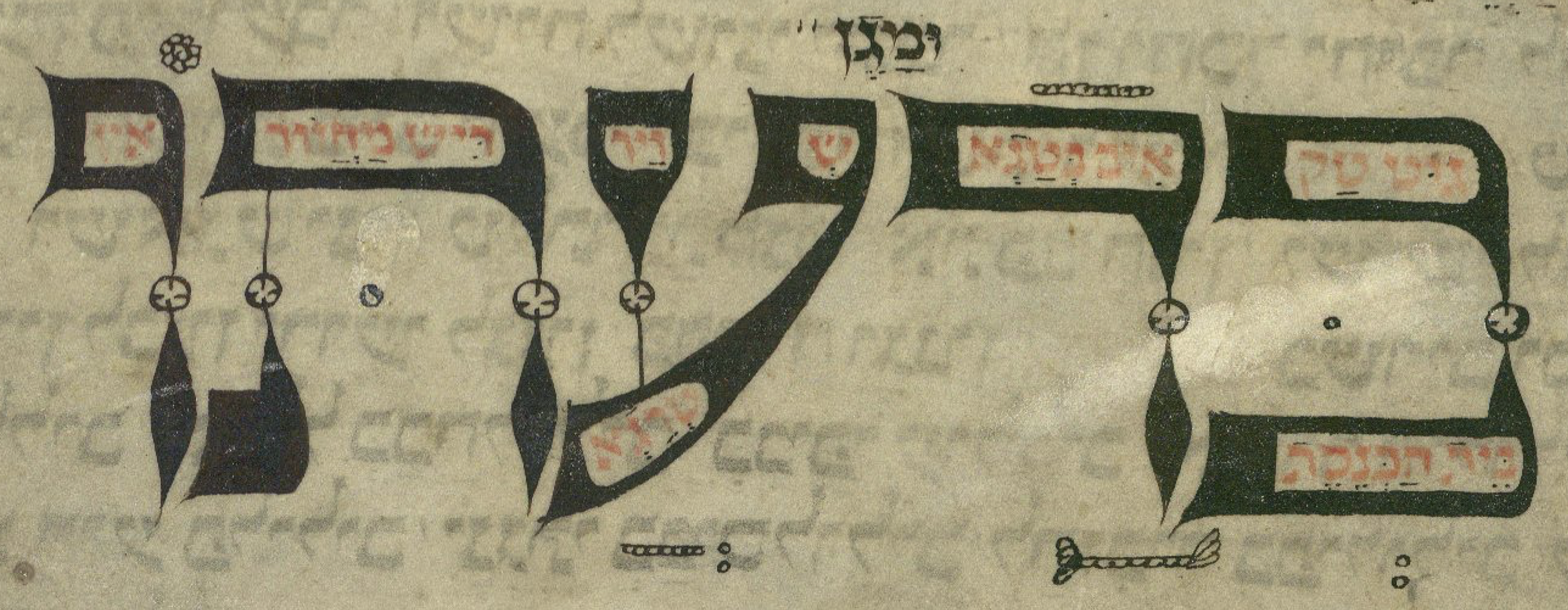
An early Yiddish text, written in red within the Hebrew title.

According to the book, at age 23 Lansky read that thousands of the few remaining Yiddish books in North America were being discarded by the children of the books' original Yiddish-speaking owners. The books meant nothing to many of those who had inherited them, as they had no knowledge of Yiddish. Thousands of volumes were thus being consigned to dumpsters and a whole literature was in danger of being lost. Lansky felt compelled to preserve the language, and issued a public appeal for unwanted Yiddish books. He received a very large number of responses and set out, with a team of volunteers, to retrieve and store the remaining Yiddish books.

== Synopsis ==
When Aaron Lansky was a Yiddish student in the late 1970s, he found it difficult to obtain Yiddish books for his studies. This caused him to have the idea of asking the broader community for Yiddish books, which he did by putting up signs around his area asking for donations. He quickly found that the number of individuals and institutions who wanted to donate books was enormous, as was the sheer number of books, which would otherwise be discarded. Lansky appealed to Jewish institutions to assist with his project of saving the Yiddish books, but there was very little interest from Jewish institutions to assist. For many, Yiddish was an unwanted and unwelcome reminder of an immigrant past. So, Lansky had to go about his project largely without institutional support. Lansky did gather community members who shared his care for preserving Yiddish, and they would assist him in the collection and transfer of the books. He recounts how emotional the process of picking up books often was, with the donors commonly insisting that the “zamlers” (book collectors) stay for food and crying when they eventually did hand over their precious books.

== Background ==
Aaron Lansky began his work in collecting Yiddish books when he was a graduate student studying Yiddish literature. His initial interest in collecting second-hand Yiddish books emerged because he had difficulty finding the Yiddish texts required for his studies. When he began advertising locally that he was looking for Yiddish books, he was quickly overwhelmed by the response of donation offers. In mid-July 1980 Lansky set out on his first formal book collection trip. Soon after, Lansky realized that a huge project was emerging and that he would not be able to collect all the available Yiddish books on his own and so enlisted volunteer “zamlers”, helpers who would collect books in conjunction with him.

In 1980 Lansky founded the National Yiddish Book Centre, which would ultimately hold over a million salvaged Yiddish Books.

In 1989, Lansky was a recipient of the MacArthur Fellowship for his work in preserving Yiddish literature and culture.

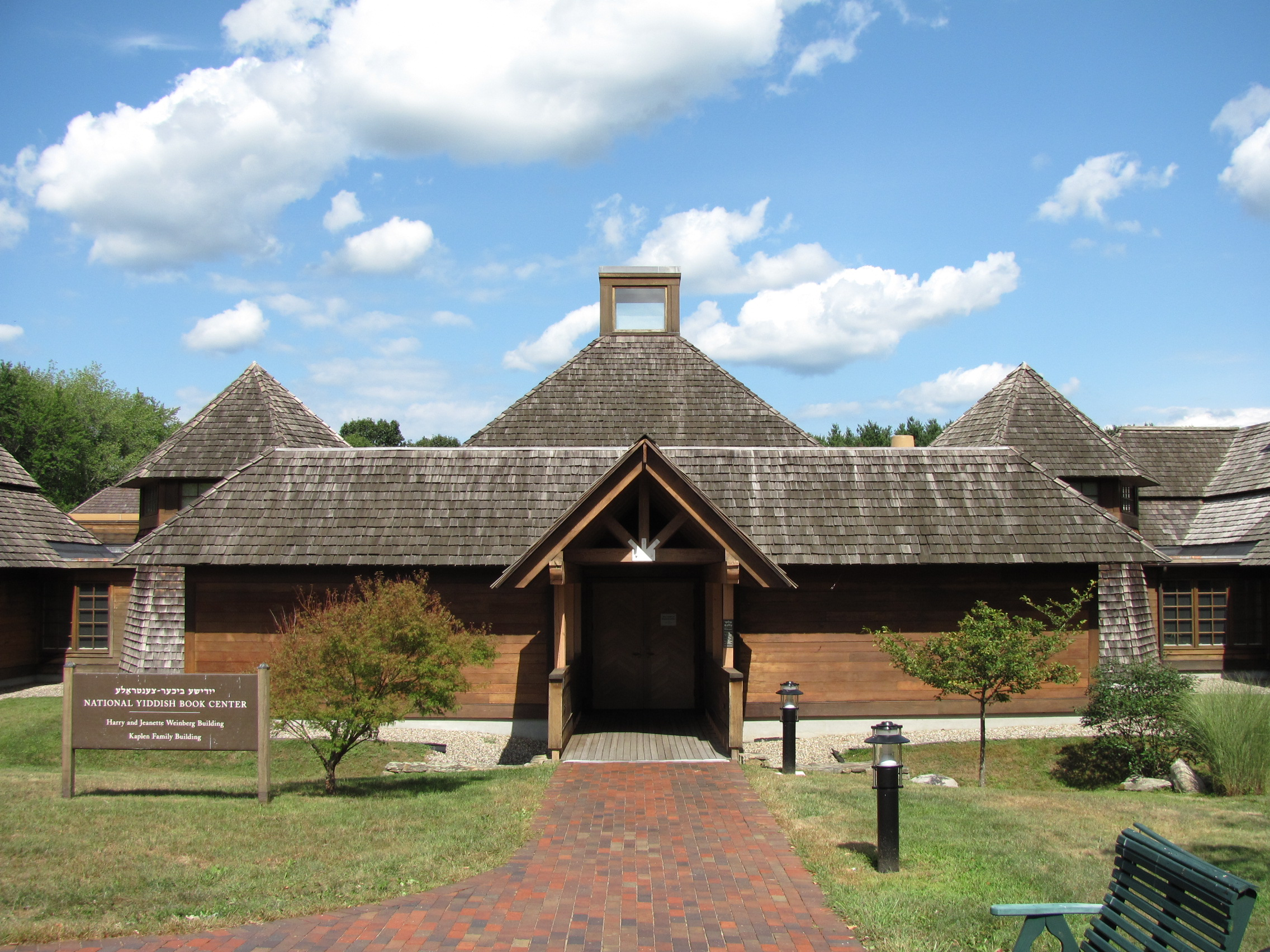
The National Yiddish Book Center. Designed by Allen Moore.

In the early days of The Yiddish Book Center, the organization struggled financially, receiving very little monetary assistance from other Jewish institutions. Initially the center was housed in an old redbrick schoolhouse, in 1991 the town of Amherst reclaimed this building leaving the organization homeless. Lansky saw this as an opportunity to find a new permanent home for the center which would also better suit its needs. Ideally he wanted a space nearby to, and in collaboration with one of the local colleges, this aspiration would eventually be realized when a 10 acre apple orchard on the campus of Hampshire College was sold to the organization in 1994. This was able to eventuate because the college's then-president Gregory Prince was interested in creating a cultural village on the campus, made up of non-profit organizations who would benefit from the location and in turn learning with their unique resources. After securing land for the building, the organization then had to go about finding an architect with a satisfactory plan for the building itself. A dozen architecture firms were interviewed with no success, until finally Allen Moore was recommended for the project by a board member. His design would ultimately be accepted. The construction of this new building wound up costing $7 million and experts had informed Lansky and his associates that raising these funds would not be possible. However, through donations from over 10,000 individuals as well as large individual donations from Steven Spielberg's Righteous Persons Foundation and the Harry and Jeanette Weinberg Foundation, the funds were eventually raised.

== Critical reception ==
Outwitting History has largely been received positively. University of London language professor John L. Flood described the book as heart-warming and moving. However, he notes that the book lacks illustrations, and specific mention of prominent or interesting books which were recovered. Flood concludes that based on the book, he believes no one has done as much to ensure the survival of the Yiddish language and literature as Aaron Lansky has. University of Chicago linguistics professor Howard L. Aronson praised the book as well-written, entertaining and informative, also noting that it has tension akin to that of a suspense novel and unforgettable characters. Similarly to Flood, Aronson concludes that few individuals have done as much for Yiddish culture as Lansky. Jewish literature scholar David G. Roskies contrasted Lansky's approach to Yiddish revitalization in Outwitting History to that of Dovid Katz in his book Words on Fire: The Unfinished Story of Yiddish. Roskies praises Lansky’s approach, emphasizing Lansky’s willingness to revive Yiddish in the context of open society, desiring to bring it to a broad readership or at least broad availability. Whereas Katz, he argued, viewed the revival of Yiddish as coming from resegregation of Jews from the broader world. Writing for the Library Review, Stuart Hannabuss recommended Outwitting History to public libraries, the general reader and Yiddish specialists. He called Lansky a natural born storyteller. Writing for the Library Journal, Herbert E. Shapiro recommended Outwitting History to all libraries and the general reading public.

== Legacy ==
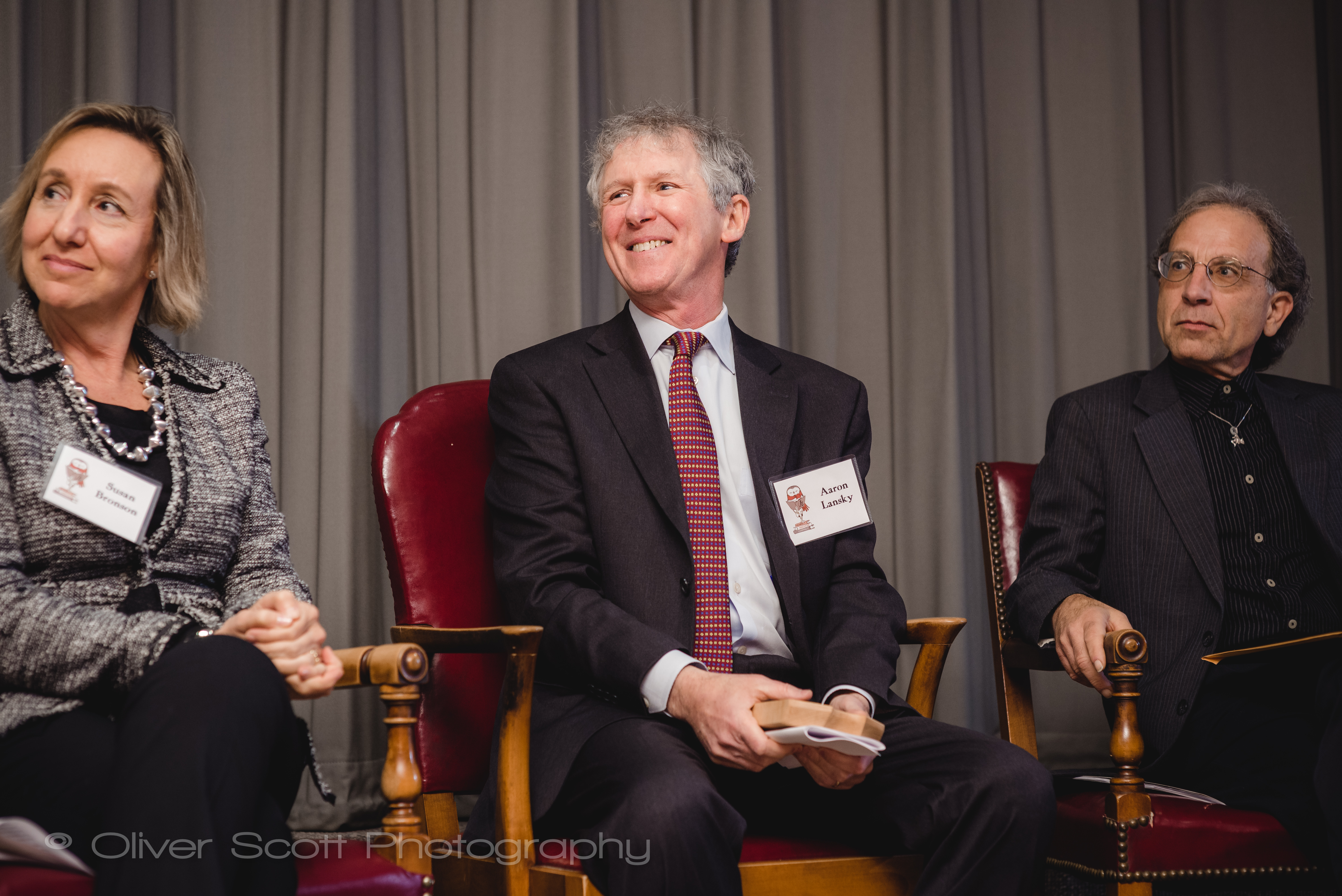
Aaron Lansky in 2016

Until his retirement in June 2025, Lansky was the president of the Yiddish Book Center, which holds more than 1 million Yiddish books. It is the largest collection of Yiddish books in the world. It is also the largest Jewish cultural organization in The United States. The center makes Yiddish widely available to the public by digitizing thousands of its books which are then available for free download. Books are also distributed from the centre to libraries, individuals and educational institutions all over the world. The center also translates the best of its Yiddish books into English, and operates The Wexler Oral History Project, which records interviews with Yiddish Speakers. The center also offers internships and fellowships in Yiddish studies and is developing a Yiddish textbook incorporating modern pedagogical methods.

The publishing of Outwitting History massively increased public awareness of The National Yiddish Book Centre and awareness of Yiddish in general. Joshua B. Friedman describes the emotional impact that the Yiddish Book Center can have on its visitors, specifically through its practices of 'thin' numerical description. He discusses the impact that the sheer number of Yiddish books preserved in the center has on visitors, and how it lets them feel confident that Yiddish will continue to be passed down to future generations. Friedman argues that the emphasis the book center places on numbers in its collection partially helps facilitate its ongoing appeal and wide array of donors and supporters. Friedman refers to this phenomenon as ""the magic" of Yiddish at the Book Center," this magical quality of the Book Center and its ability to rally incredible support from the public has also been referenced by Leora Bromberg. In speaking of this magic, both authors reference Lansky's quote of Max Weinreich in Outwitting History; "Yiddish has magic, it will outwit history." Freidman argues that the role of the Book Center as an institution is blurred between preserving the actual content of Yiddish books and the material books themselves. He argues that this produces a productive ambiguity which allows visitors to the Center to decide exactly how the preserved books are or can be valuable. Friedman links this great perceived material value of the books to a broader sanctification of survival in Jewish culture. That these books represent the possibility of Yiddish continuing to new generations imbues them with inherent value.

== Sources ==
- Muse magazine March 2007 Volume 11, Number 3
- https://web.archive.org/web/20120208151447/http://www.massbook.org/reading_guides/Outwitting%20History%20discussion%20guide2%20PDF.pdf
- http://yiddishbookcenter.org/+10183

== See also ==
- Muse (children's magazine)
