= Christa Whitney =

American oral historian

- Born: 1987 (age 38–39); Oakland, California, U.S.
- Education: Smith College (BA)
- Occupations: Oral historian; Yiddishist; documentary filmmaker
- Employer: Yiddish Book Center
- Movement: Yiddishism

Christa Patricia Whitney (Yiddish: קריסטאַ פּאַטרישאַ װיטני; born 1987) is an American oral historian, Yiddishist, and documentary filmmaker. Since 2010, she has been the director of the Wexler Oral History Project at the Yiddish Book Center, which conducts interviews about Yiddish language and culture at a global level.

== Early life and career ==
Whitney was born in 1987 in Oakland, California. She was raised in the small town of Kensington in the San Francisco Bay Area. She is of Lithuanian and Irish descent. Whitney was raised in the Catholic Church.

While a student at El Cerrito High School, Whitney became interested in Jewish history upon taking an elective class on World War II. She studied Yiddish poetry with Yiddish scholar Justin Cammy while at Smith College, earning degrees in comparative literature and dance. After graduating in 2009, she began working at the nearby Yiddish Book Center in Amherst, Massachusetts as an intern.

In 2013, Whitney conducted an oral history interview with actor Leonard Nimoy in Los Angeles. Since the start of her position, she has conducted over 1,000 interviews, many of which are Holocaust survivors.

With the support of the Wexler Oral History Project, alongside Liz Walber, Whitney co-directed and co-produced her first documentary film, titled BEYLE: The Artist and Her Legacy, released in 2019, about the life of Yiddishist Beyle Schaechter-Gottesman. In 2021, with Hadas Kalderon and Emily Felder, she co-directed and co-produced the feature-length documentary film Ver Vet Blaybn? (Who Will Remain?) about the life of Yiddish poet Abraham Sutzkever.

Whitney is currently pursuing her MBA at the Isenberg School of Management at the University of Massachusetts Amherst.

== Filmography ==
| Year | Title | Director | Producer | Notes |
|---|---|---|---|---|
| 2019 | BEYLE: The Artist and Her Legacy | Yes | Yes | Co-directed by Liz Walber |
| 2021 | Ver Vet Blaybn? (Who Will Remain?) | Yes | Yes | Co-directed by Emily Felder; narrated by Ruth Wisse |
