= Ellen Palmer Allerton =

American poet

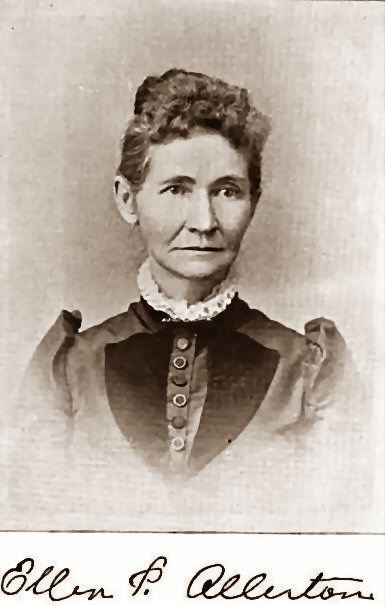
- Ellen P. Allerton's Walls of Corn, and Other Poems, 1894
- Born: Ellen Palmer; October 17, 1835; Centerville, New York, United States
- Died: August 31, 1893 (aged 57); Padonia, Brown County, Kansas, United States
- Occupations: Teacher, farmer and poet
- Spouse: Alpheus Burton Allerton

Ellen Palmer Allerton (October 17, 1835 – August 31, 1893) was an American poet whose inspiration probably came from her life on farms in rural New York, Wisconsin, and Kansas. She is best remembered for the poems Beautiful Things, The Trail of Forty-Nine and Walls of Corn.

== Life ==
Ellen Palmer was born in Centerville, New York, the youngest and only daughter among a family of eight children raised by William Palmer and his second wife, Eleanor Knickerbocker. Her father, a farmer, was born in East Guilford, Vermont on November 1, 1786, and her mother, a descendant of Dutch pioneers, on July 10, 1792, at Salisbury, Connecticut. Before she could read or write, Allerton was said to have had the ability to compose poems in her head and later recite them from memory.

Allerton received her higher education at an academy in Hamilton, New York before becoming a school teacher at around eighteen in Centerville. In 1862, she traveled to Wisconsin where she met and married Alpheus Burton Allerton, a single father of a daughter and son. Her husband, born February 18, 1831, was native of Cuyahoga County, Ohio and a descendant of Isaac Allerton who, along with his wife and children, had made passage aboard the Mayflower on its maiden voyage to Plymouth Rock.

Allerton and her husband lived for nearly seventeen years on a farm nestled along the western slope of Rock River Valley not far from the then remote village of Lake Mills. The broad country road that skirted their farmhouse was described by Allerton as "a ribbon of gray with a border of green", and by Eva Ryan in the following passage from her book, Ellen P. Allerton's Walls of Corn, and Other Poems (1894):

At a short distance the road crossed a clear babbling brook which flowed under a rustic bridge, away through a grove of oaks, down beside the meadows and wheat fields, bisecting other roads toward the Rock River, of which it is a tributary. There was an orchard protected by a belt of willows. Some rods away was a spring, the overflow of which formed a rill leading to the creek. Across the road on the side of the hill to the westward was the abandoned stone quarry described in one of her most charming and characteristic poems.

In 1879, the Allertons traveled to Kansas by covered wagon to settle on a plot of land in Brown County near the towns of Hamlin and Padonia. By the end of Allerton’s life, their Kansas farm would grow to boast of a beautiful home, full granaries, herds of cattle and horses, orchards of apple and peach and rows of shade and decorative trees.

Allterton first submitted poems to be published in newspapers in Milwaukee and Chicago shortly after her marriage. Elias A. Calkins, a writer and editor who worked on papers in both cities, was an early supporter and friend instrumental in publishing her works. A volume of her poems was compiled and published in 1885 as Annabel: And Other Poems (Poems of the Prairies) and again in 1894 by Eva Ryan in a book entitled Ellen P. Allerton's Walls of Corn, and Other Poems.

Mrs. Allerton's rhymes are musical, and her thought is always encouraging. She is never gloomy. She does not plow so deep as some, but there is more of her golden grain in the market. Ewing Herbert (later editor Hiawatha Daily World)

== Death ==
Allerton died on the last day of August 1893 and was laid to rest in the small graveyard at Hamlin in a bed of her favorite white flowers provided by her close friends. Her husband died at age 81 on November 9, 1912, and was interred at Hamlin. Chiseled on the back of Allerton’s gravestone are the last seven lines from her poem, Beautiful Things.

Beautiful twilight at set of sun,
Beautiful goal with race well won,
Beautiful rest with work well done.

Beautiful graves where grasses creep,
Where brown leaves fall, where drifts lie deep,
Over worn-out hands! Ah, beautiful sleep.
