= Yiddish Book Center =

Cultural institution in Amherst, Massachusetts, United States

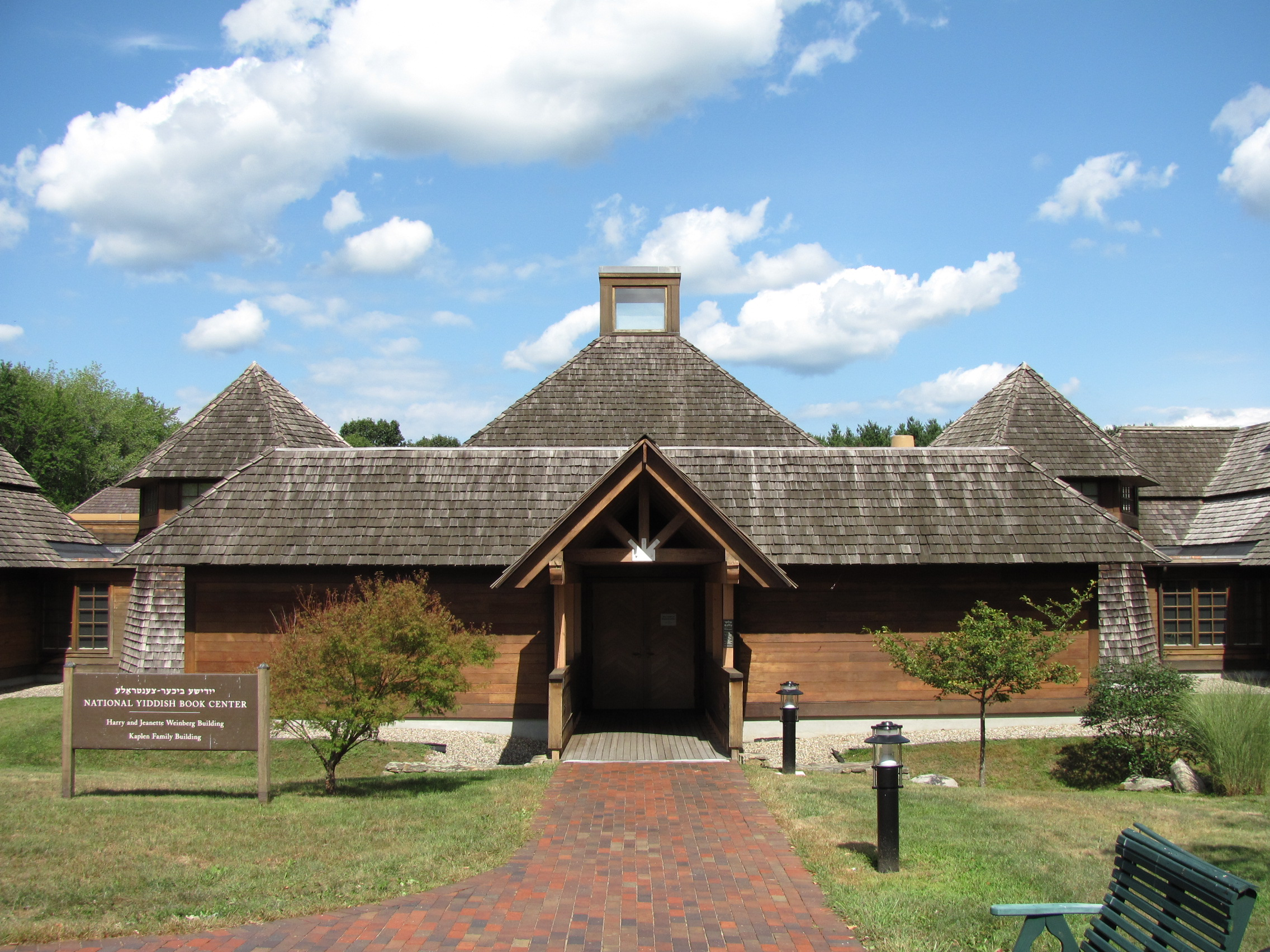
- Entrance foyer of the Yiddish Book Center (2016)

- Location within Massachusetts
- Established: 1980
- Location: 1021 West Street, Amherst, MA, 01002
- Coordinates: 42.322°N 72.527703°W
- Website: www.yiddishbookcenter.org

The Yiddish Book Center Yiddish: ייִדישער ביכער־צענטער, romanized: Yidisher Bikher-Tsenter (formerly the National Yiddish Book Center), located within the campus of Hampshire College in Amherst, Massachusetts, United States, is a cultural institution dedicated to the preservation of books in the Yiddish language, as well as the culture and history those books represent. It is one of ten western Massachusetts museums constituting the Museums10 consortium.

== History ==
The Yiddish Book Center was founded in 1980 by Aaron Lansky, then a twenty-four-year-old graduate student of Yiddish literature and, until his retirement in June 2025, the center's president. In the course of his studies, Lansky realized that untold numbers of irreplaceable Yiddish books were being discarded by American-born Jews unable to read the language of their Yiddish-speaking parents and grandparents. He organized a nationwide network of zamlers (volunteer book collectors) and launched a campaign to save the world's remaining Yiddish books. Lansky recounts the origins of the center in his 2004 memoir, Outwitting History.

At the time Lansky began his work, scholars estimated there were 70,000 Yiddish books still extant and recoverable. Since then, the Yiddish Book Center has recovered more than a million volumes, and it continues to receive thousands of new books each year from around the world.

In 1997, the Yiddish Book Center moved to its current site in Amherst, Massachusetts, a 49,000-square-foot complex that echoes the rooflines of an East European shtetl (Jewish town). The center is home to permanent and travelling exhibits, a Yiddish book repository, educational programs, and the annual Yidstock: The Festival of New Yiddish Music.

In 2010, the organization dropped the initial word "National" from its name, and is currently known as "Yiddish Book Center."

Based on a score of 100, Charity Navigator rated the Yiddish Book Center a score of 97 out of 100 for Accountability and Finance, noting its independent board and positive financial status, and labeled it a 4-Star charity for the fiscal year of 2023.

== Collections ==
The center has drawn on its duplicate holdings to distribute books to students and scholars, and to establish or strengthen collections at more than 700 research libraries, schools, and museums around the world.

The Yiddish Book Center includes a number of different collections:

- In 1997, with a grant from the Righteous Persons Foundation, the center launched its Steven Spielberg Digital Yiddish Library, which has digitized and cataloged more than 12,000 Yiddish titles and made them available for free download from the Internet Archive. In 2012, the Yiddish Book Center formed a partnership with the National Library of Israel, which was launching its own project to digitize its entire Hebrew-alphabet collection, including thousands of Yiddish titles. The effort prompted The New York Times to declare Yiddish "proportionately the most accessible literature on the planet". As of the end of 2014, the titles in the Steven Spielberg Digital Yiddish Library have been downloaded 1.3 million times.
- The David and Sylvia Steiner Yizkor Books Collection comprises hundreds of yizkor books, memorial volumes commemorating Jewish communities in East Europe that were destroyed in the Holocaust. The books in the collection can be searched online.
- The Noah Cotsen Library of Yiddish Children's Literature includes about 800 titles, both original Yiddish works and Yiddish translations of classic stories written in other languages. The majority of the titles, which come from the YIVO Institute for Jewish Research as well as from the center's own collection, have been digitized and included in the Steven Spielberg Digital Yiddish Library.
- The Sami Rohr Library of Recorded Yiddish Books is a collection of roughly 150 titles, including novels, short stories, nonfiction works, memoirs, essays, and poetry. The recordings were made at the Jewish Public Library of Montreal (JPL) in the 1980s and '90s by native Yiddish-speaking volunteers.
- The Frances Brandt Online Yiddish Audio Library comprises recordings of lectures by, and interviews with, writers and poets who visited the JPL between 1953 and 2005. The Yiddish Book Center is now working with the JPL to digitize the recordings. Ultimately, approximately 1,100 recordings from the collection will be digitized and accessible.
- The Wexler Oral History Project is a collection of more than 1,400 oral history interviews, documentary films, and archival footage related to Yiddish language and culture. Many of the interviews comprise Holocaust survivor testimonies, although the collection also features interviews with contemporary Yiddish scholars, cultural contributors, and students. In 2010, the Yiddish Book Center appointed Christa Whitney as director of the project, who has since conducted over 1,000 of the collection's interviews and directed documentary films about Yiddishists with historical significance. In 2013, the project interviewed Leonard Nimoy.

== Visitor Center and Museum, Public Programs and Resources ==
In October 2024, the Yiddish Book Center opened a new permanent exhibition, Yiddish: A Global Culture, that places Yiddish at the heart of intellectual and creative life in Europe and the Americas. The center hosts temporary exhibits featuring Jewish artists and themes.

The center also hosts a variety of in-person and online public programs on a range of topics related to Yiddish and modern Jewish culture including the annual Yidstock: The Festival of New Yiddish Music.

Pakn Treger (Yiddish for "book peddler"), the magazine of the Yiddish Book Center, is an English-language magazine that covers subjects related to Yiddish culture and literature as well as news from the center. Its annual translation issue, a digital publication, features newly translated works of Yiddish literature.

== Educational programs ==
The center's online and in-person educational programs include the Steiner Summer Yiddish Program for college students, the Great Jewish Books Summer Program for high school students, a Great Jewish Books Teacher Workshop, a fellowship program, a translation fellowship, as well as online and on-site classes for adult learners, including the Bossie Dubowick YiddishSchool. The center also offers a field trip program for middle and high school students.

== Translation and other initiatives ==
In 2013, the center launched a translation effort that includes a translation fellowship program; a publishing venture; Taytsh.org, a website and interactive resource for working Yiddish-to-English translators; and an annual digital Pakn Treger translation anthology. In 2019, the center established White Goat Press, the Yiddish Book Center's imprint. White Goat Press is committed to bringing newly translated work to the widest readership possible, publishing work in all genres. As of 2024, White Goat Press has releases over twenty titles including In eynem: The New Yiddish Textbook.
