= Padonia Township, Kansas =

Padonia Township
- Township
- Location in Brown County

- Location within state of Kansas
- Coordinates: 39°57′05″N 095°31′46″W
- Country: United States
- State: Kansas
- County: Brown

Area
  - Total: 41.36 sq mi (107.11 km^{2})
  - Land: 41.30 sq mi (106.96 km^{2})
  - Water: 0.058 sq mi (0.15 km^{2}) 0.14%
- Elevation: 1,027 ft (313 m)

Population (2000)
  - Total: 259
  - Density: 6.2/sq mi (2.4/km^{2})
- GNIS feature ID: 0472787

Padonia Township is a township in Brown County, Kansas, United States. As of the 2000 census, its population was 259.

== Today ==
The Civil Township of Padonia is both a geographic subdivision of Brown County and a form of local government. While the 41-plus square mile area of land is governmentally and officially the "Township of Padonia," the name most often refers colloquially to the grouping of houses and grain elevator.

Originating largely from closely placed Welsh settlements in 1869, a group of individual residences remains in the original location probably because the lots are still designated the size to accommodate them. Mostly on one- or two-acre plots of land, the privately owned residences are surrounded by both woods and corn fields. The Sac & Fox Nation of Missouri in Kansas and Nebraska is also a property holder in the community, of both farming ground and a former private residence.

The limits of the centralized Padonia are marked by town addresses and street signs, which differentiate from the rural street signs of the surrounding area. However, in general the colloquial limits of the "town" extend a bit beyond that, to expand the number of residences from six or seven to upwards of ten. Voting services were offered in Padonia for local elections up until the last few years, when they were moved to the nearest larger community and county seat, Hiawatha.

The Padonia grain elevator was until recently an independent co-operative owned by Padonia farmers, and is now part of Ag Partners of Hiawatha.

== History ==
Like most communities, the agrarian Township of Padonia has a plurality of origins, from its first European settler (1854) to the establishment of civic and religious services (1850s) to its official foundation (1869). And like countless agricultural communities in the Midwest, many of its historic markings have receded as gradually as they were established, leaving only their names to mark their passing. In addition, many of the services that constitute a "town" were gradually closed or incorporated into the surrounding communities, largely Hiawatha. However, generally a quiet part of the world, Padonia's inhabitants don't seem to miss the loss, and instead enjoy the rich soil, intermittently wooded land, and company of neighbors within its forty-one plus square miles.

The first registered settler in the Civil Township of Padonia was E. R. Cornelison, who made his claim on April 3, 1854. By 1857, enough settlers had joined him that a post office was established on October 20, with Orville Root as its first postmaster. A schoolhouse joined it in 1858, built by the Padonia Town Company, a private corporation. It became part of public school's District 13.

However, it wasn't until 1869 that the Township of Padonia was officially founded, by Welsh immigrant and farmer David Evans. Its foundation consisted of ten families, all who came from Wales with Evans, and who (according to Kansas historian Cutler) "constitute[d] the best citizens and substantial farmers of this township." Padonia was probably named after Jessie Padon, a settler in a log hut on the bank of the Walnut, near Schmidt's sawmill.Because of its Welsch origins, Padonia was known as the Welsch Settlement of Padonia Township.

While never thickly populated, the 1880 federal census shows a population of 756 citizens in the approximately forty square mile area. In contrast, the actual grouping of houses was, in 1883, called "merely a thick settlement of farm houses." However, this grouping was at least large enough for a Justice of the Peace, Treasurer, church, and—as previously mentioned—post office and school. The Justice of the Peace in 1883 was Civil War veteran David Hillyer. The Treasurer, serving his third term, was John E. Davis, farmer and member of local Hiawatha Masonic Lodge, No. 35. But the township was never incorporated, and so never had a mayor, city council, or public services such as electricity or water.

The township's only church, Padonia Christian Church, was completed and dedicated in September 1881, at a total cost of $2,200, and had seventy-five members two years later in 1883. Historian Cutler argues that these families "consist[ed] of some of the most prominent and influential citizens and their families, of Padonia and Hamlin townships". It is still standing today.

Padonia contains one cemetery.

== Literature ==
Notable of this small community is its native daughter 19th-century poet Ellen Palmer Allerton, whose works were compiled in Walls of Corn and Other Poems (Hiawatha: The Harrington Printing Co. 1894) and Annabel, and Other Poems. Her poems treat themes of past and present state interest, such as pride in Kansas children ("Kansas, the Prairie Queen") and the issue of evolution ("A Housekeeper's Question").

== Geography ==
Padonia Township covers an area of 41.36 square miles (107.1 km^{2}) and contains no incorporated settlements.
