= Hamblin (surname) =

Hamblin is a surname. Notable people with the surname include:

- Charles Leonard Hamblin (1922-1985), Australian philosopher, logician and professor
- Henry Thomas Hamblin (1873-1958), English mystic, author, and publisher
- Jacob Hamblin (1819-1886), American pioneer and missionary
- Jacob Darwin Hamblin (born 1974), American historian of science, technology, and environmental issues
- James Hamblin (disambiguation), multiple people
- Joseph Eldridge Hamblin (1828-1870), American general during the Civil War
- Ken Hamblin (1940- ), host of the Ken Hamblin Show
- T. J. Hamblin (1943-2012), Professor of Immunohaematology at the University of Southampton
- Thomas S. Hamblin (1800-1853), English actor and theatre manager
- William J. Hamblin, professor of history at Brigham Young University

== See also ==
- Lee–Hamblin family
