= Hamlyn =

Hamlyn may refer to:

== People ==
- Alan Hamlyn, U.S.-English soccer defender of the 1960s and 1970s
- Paul Hamlyn (1926–2001), founder of the Hamlyn publishing company
- William Hamlyn-Harris (b. 1978), Australian javelin thrower

== Other ==
- Hamlyn (publisher), UK publisher non-fiction illustrated books
- Hamlyn Heights, Victoria, a suburb of Geelong in Australia
- Hamlyn Terrace, New South Wales, a suburb in the Central Coast
- Hamlyn's monkey (Cercopithecus hamlyni), also known as the owl-faced monkey

== See also ==
- Hamlin (disambiguation)
- Hamelin, German town
