= A Gentle Madness =

1995 book

- First edition cover of A Gentle Madness
- Author: Nicholas A. Basbanes
- Subject: Book collecting
- Publisher: Henry Holt
- Publication date: August 1, 1995
- Pages: 584
- ISBN: 0-8050-3653-9

A Gentle Madness: Bibliophiles, Bibliomanes, and the Eternal Passion for Books is a 1995 nonfiction book of book collecting case studies by Nicholas A. Basbanes. It was a 1995 National Book Critics Circle Award finalist.

== Synopsis ==
The first section of the book features famous book collectors from Antiquities to the modern day. Past collectors mentioned include the likes of Alexander the Great, Petrarch, and Catherine the Great. Modern collectors include people like Aaron Lansky and Charles L. Blockson.

A Gentle Madness also covered Stephen Blumberg, who had stolen over $10 million worth of books from libraries.

== Development ==
The title is derived from a quote by Benjamin Thomas regarding his grandfather Isaiah Thomas, founder of the American Antiquarian Society, who was stricken with "the gentlest of infirmities, bibliomania."

Basbanes was motivated to write the book after his wife, Constance, encouraged him to do more research on book collecting after he wrote an article for the Boston University's Bostonia alumni magazine in 1989 regarding notable Boston book collections. The book was subsequently dedicated to Constance. He began writing the book part-time while working as an editor for the book section of the Telegram & Gazette, until he was fired in 1991 due to cost-cutting measures.

Most of the research was conducted at Harvard University's Widener Library. However, Basbanes also traveled to several metropolitan cities, such as London and Paris, to attend auctions and interview collectors. He also went to Iowa for book thief Stephen Blumberg's trial. Widener Library was one of Blumberg's targets. Basbanes had to spend profusely to maintain his research, using up savings and taking advances on book royalties.

== Release ==
Basbanes had initially contracted with publisher Random House to release the book. However, due to corporate downsizing at the company in 1992, his editor was fired and his book's release was dropped despite being advertised.

The book was released fall of 1995 by Henry Holt and Company with an initial printing of 7,500, which sold out in three days

The "definitive edition" was published, in print and digital, in 2012.

== Reception ==
Upon its release, reviews were mostly positive and most critics recommended the book for those who were interested in the medium of books or its collection.

Kirkus Reviews wrote that A Gentle Madness' numerous anecdotes manages to capture the spirit of acquiring books, although it "never really gets to the bottom of bibliomania." Furthermore, they wrote that the book is a "Must reading for any book collector, and a nice addition to even modest personal libraries." Philip Kopper for The New York Times praised its vast compilation of colorful collecting characters. However, he noted that the book is also overblown and repetitive in places, noting Basbane's propensity for superlatives and the book's comprehensive but not definitive account of the subject. Michael Dirda of The Washington Post called it a "ingratiating and altogether enjoyable book", praising the book's "wonderful gallery of modern eccentrics" despite its occasional lapses in literary history.

In 1995, it was selected as a General Nonfiction finalist for the National Book Critics Circle Award.

=== Legacy ===
In 2010, Allison Hoover Bartlett writing for the Wall Street Journal named it one of the most influential works about book collecting published in the twentieth century.

== See also ==
- The Great Book-Collectors
