= USS Hamlin =

Two ships of the United States Navy have been named USS Hamlin, after Hamlin Sound near Charleston, South Carolina.

- USS Hamlin (CVE-15), was an escort carrier loaned to the United Kingdom in 1942 and operated as HMS Stalker until 1945, later being sold and converted to a merchant ship
- USS Hamlin (AV-15), was a seaplane tender in service from 1944 to 1947
