= Hamlin Reservation =

Nature reserve in Massachusetts, United States

Coordinates: 42°40′10″N 70°48′36″W

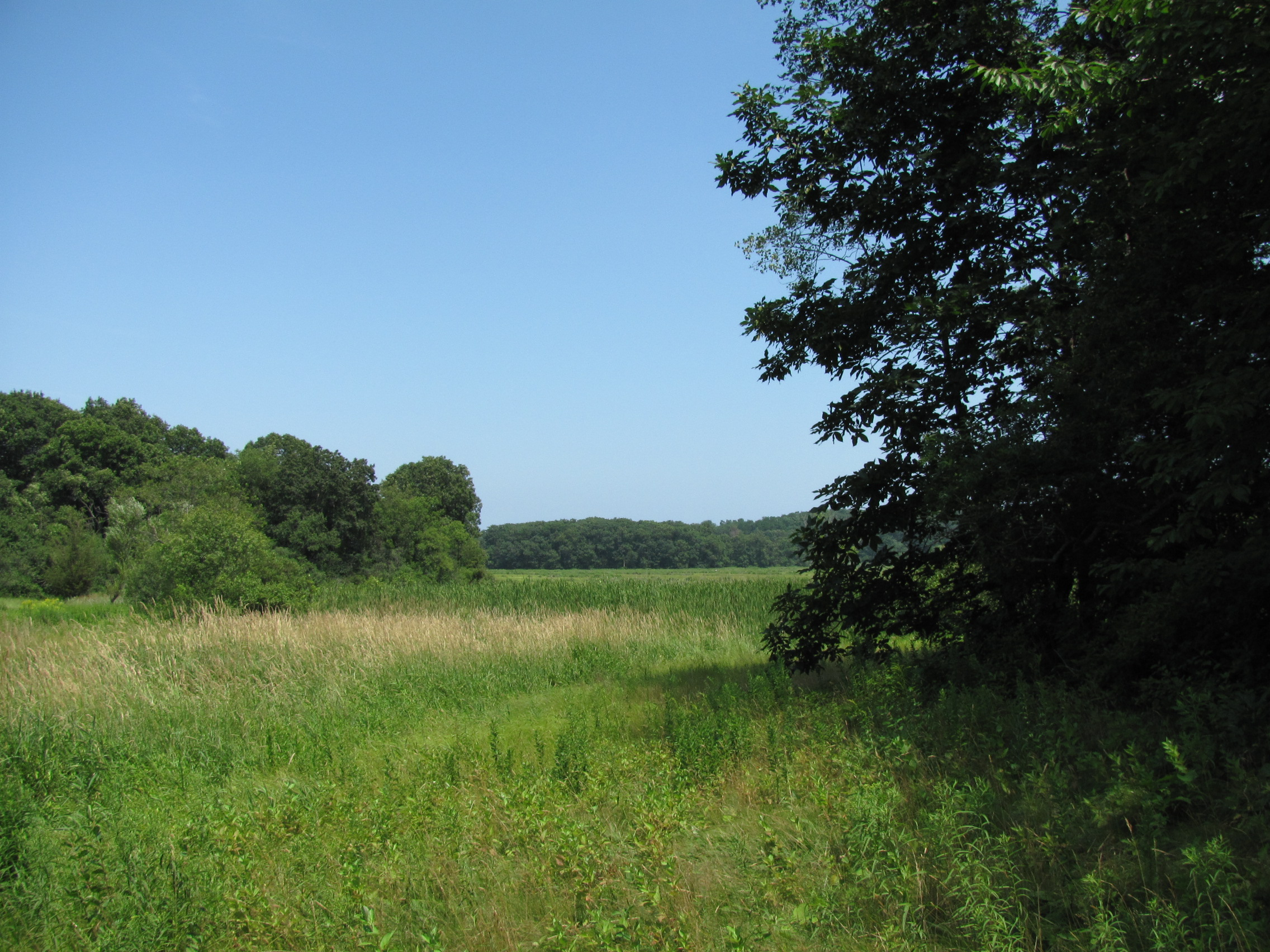
Hamlin Reservation

Hamlin Reservation is a nature reserve located in Ipswich, Massachusetts. The reserve was established by The Trustees of Reservations in 1993.
