= Robert W. Hamblin =

Robert Wayne Hamblin (born November 5, 1938) is a poet, an author, and a professor emeritus at Southeast Missouri State University. He is best known for his achievements related to the works of William Faulkner.

== Early years ==
Hamblin attended Baldwyn, Mississippi public schools and graduated from Booneville High School in Mississippi. After attending Northeast Mississippi Community College, he graduated from Delta State University in 1960 with a bachelor's degree in English education. He went on to gain his master's and doctoral degrees from the University of Mississippi in 1965 and 1976, respectively.

== Career ==
Hamblin entered the teaching profession at Sparrows Point High School in Baltimore County, Maryland, where he taught English and coached baseball. He began teaching at Southeast Missouri State in 1965 and became the founding director of the Center for Faulkner Studies at the university in 1989. In 1978 Hamblin met the renowned Faulkner collector Louis Daniel Brodsky and for the next 36 years, until Brodsky's death, the two men collaborated on books, articles, exhibits, lectures, and other public programs based on the materials in Brodsky's Faulkner collection.

His interest in Faulkner began when Hamblin was in graduate school. As integration occurred at the University of Mississippi, "Faulkner helped me," he said, through the author's treatment of "racial justice, equality and brotherhood and atoning for the sins of the past." Both his master's thesis and his doctoral dissertation focused on topics related to Faulkner.

In addition to Hamblin's classroom teaching, he led seminars for the Missouri Humanities Council and the National Endowment for the Humanities and lectured and led seminars about Faulkner across the United States and in China, England, Japan, the Netherlands, Romania, and Taiwan. In 2005, he was the leader of Oprah's Book Club's online discussion of Faulkner's As I Lay Dying. The study was part of Oprah Winfrey's Summer of Faulkner. He also edited a newsletter focused on teaching the writings of Faulkner in secondary- and university-level classes and published a variety of works about the author, including Myself & the World: A Biography of William Faulkner.

In addition to his writings about Faulkner, Hamblin's published works cover a variety of topics, including fiction, nonfiction, and poetry. He served as poetry editor for a journal about sports literature and was associate editor of a poetry magazine.

== Recognition ==
Hamblin's awards and prizes include the following:

- His book, This House, This Town: One Couple’s Love Affair with an Old House and a Historic Town, was a candidate for the 2011 Book Prize at the University of Mary Washington.
- In 2007, he and his wife, Kaye, received the Excellence in Historic Preservation Award by Sigma Pi Kappa, the international honor society for historic preservation. The award resulted from their rehabilitation and preservation of the Harrison House in Cape Girardeau, Missouri.
- In 2006, he was awarded Southeast Missouri State University's PRIDE Award, which goes to "a faculty member who has demonstrated excellence as a teacher, an extraordinary level of scholarship and service, and whose overall accomplishments are especially noteworthy."
- In 1998, he won the Missouri Library Association's Literary Award, which recognizes "a Missouri writer or an individual who has written an outstanding book on some aspect of Missouri life."
- In 1992, he received the Willie D. Halsell Prize, which is awarded by the Mississippi Historical Society "for the best article in the Journal of Mississippi History".

== Publications ==
Boyer, Allen, and Robert Hamblin. At Silver Lake: Photographs and Poems. Independently published, 2024. Boyer, Allen, and Robert Hamblin. Seasons: Photographs and Poems. Independently published, 2025. Brodsky, Louis Daniel, and Robert W. Hamblin, eds. Country Lawyer and Other Stories for the Screen, by William Faulkner. Jackson: University Press of Mississippi, 1987. Brodsky, Louis Daniel, and Robert W. Hamblin, eds. Faulkner: A Comprehensive Guide to the Brodsky Collection. 5 vols. Jackson: University Press of Mississippi, 1982-1988. Brodsky, Louis Daniel, and Robert W. Hamblin, eds. Stallion Road: A Screenplay, by William Faulkner. Jackson: University Press of Mississippi, 1989. Clubbs, Brooke Hildebrand, and Robert Hamblin. Friend to Friend: Dialogue Poems. Independently published, 2023. Dunn, Roxanne, and Robert W. Hamblin, eds. Gifts of Oneself: Art and Writings by James H. Hamby. Compiled by Roy Dawson. Cape Girardeau: Southeast Missouri State University, 2016. Fargnoli, A. Nicholas, Michael Golay, and Robert W. Hamblin. A Critical Companion to William Faulkner: A Literary Reference to His Life and Work. New York: Facts on File, 2008. Fargnoli, Nicholas, and Robert Hamblin, eds. Poets Speaking to Poets: Echoes and Tributes. [New York:] Ars Omnia Press, 2021. Gathman, Allen, and Robert Hamblin. Look and Listen: Photographs and Poems. Independently published, 2023. Hahn, Stephen, and Robert W. Hamblin, eds. Teaching Faulkner: Approaches and Methods. Westport, Conn.: Greenwood Press, 2000. Hamblin, Robert. A Child's World: Photographs and Poems. Independently published, 2023. Hamblin, Robert. At the Bridge Cafe: Poems. Independently published, 2022. Hamblin, Robert. Balance Exercises: Poems. Independently published, 2023. Hamblin, Robert. Bless You, My Father. Independently published, 2005; Reissued, 2018. Hamblin, Robert. Bread and Stones: Poems. Independently published, 2022. Hamblin, Robert. Class of '56: Cords of Memory: Poems. Independently published, 2021. Hamblin, Robert. Conversations with Moo: A Whole Damn Book about a Dog: Poems. Independently published, 2022. Hamblin, Robert W. Critical Essays on William Faulkner. Jackson: University Press of Mississippi, 2022. Chinese edition: Trans. Bai Jing and others. Harbin University Press, 2025. Hamblin, Robert. Crossroads: Poems of a Mississippi Childhood. St. Louis: Time Being Books, 2010. Chinese edition: Trans. Li Lulu and others; ed. Li Changlei and Wang Xiumei. School of Foreign Languages, University of Jinan, 2017. Hamblin, Robert. Darkness Descending: Love Poems for a Beloved Stricken with Alzheimer’s. Independently published, 2019. Hamblin, Robert. Dogwood Winter and Other Seasons. Rockville Centre, NY: Ars Omnia Press, 2014. Hamblin, Robert. Dreams Live On and Other Poems. Independently published, 2022. Hamblin, Robert. Dust and Light: Poems, After Pierre Teilhard de Chardin. Rockville Centre, NY: Ars Omnia Press, 2012. Hamblin, Robert. Elizabeth: An Adoption Story. Independently published, 2021. Hamblin, Robert. Endnotes: Poems of Old Age and Remembrance. Independently published, 2021. Hamblin, Robert. Epiphanies, Large and Small: Collected Poems. Independently published, 2020. Hamblin, Robert W., ed. An Evans Harrington Reader. Oxford, MS: Nautilus Publishing Company, 2018. Hamblin, Robert. From the Ground Up. St. Louis: Time Being Books, 1992. Hamblin, Robert. Gerald: A Biography of Gerald Wayne Walton. Independently published, 2025. Hamblin, Robert. Holy Relics: Poems. Independently published, 2022. Hamblin, Robert. Keeping Score: Sports Poems for Every Season. St. Louis: Time Being Books, 2007. Hamblin, Robert. For Kaye: The Afterlife: Poems. Independently published, 2020. Hamblin, Robert. Leaving Here. Independently published, 2018. Hamblin, Robert. Literary Gleanings: Poems on Authors and Books. Independently published, 2023. Hamblin, Robert W. Living in Mississippi: The Life and Times of Evans Harrington. Jackson: University Press of Mississippi, 2017. Hamblin, Robert. Memories That Bless and Burn: A Novel. Independently published, 2022. Hamblin, Robert. Mind the Gap: Poems by an American in London. Cape Girardeau: Southeast Missouri State University Press, 2003. Hamblin, Robert W. Mississippi and Beyond: Selected Essays. Independently published, 2019. Hamblin, Robert. More Stories with Funny Margins: Poems. Independently published, 2023. Hamblin, Robert. Murder in a Small Town: A Novella. Independently published, 2023. Hamblin, Robert. Musings: Poems for Myself. Independently published, 2024. Hamblin, Robert W. My Life with Faulkner and Brodsky. Cape Girardeau: Southeast Missouri State University Press, 2017. Hamblin, Robert W. Myself and the World: A Biography of William Faulkner. Jackson: University Press of Mississippi, 2016. Hamblin, Robert W. “No Such Thing As Was”: William Faulkner and Southern History. Southeast Missouri State University: Center for Faulkner Studies, 1994. Hamblin, Robert. Oldtimer's Game: Poems of Baseball and Memory. Independently published, 2022. Hamblin, Robert. Our Fathers' Lives: A Novella. Independently published, 2023. Hamblin, Robert. Pandemic: Poems of Anguish, Anger, and Hope. Independently published, 2021. Hamblin, Robert. Pensées, After Pascal: Poems. Independently published, 2021. Hamblin, Robert. Perpendicular Rain. Cape Girardeau: Southeast Missouri State University, 1986. Hamblin, Robert. Plutarch Redux: Parallel Poems in the Age of Trump. Independently published, 2021. Hamblin, Robert. Preacher in Overalls: Poems: The Story of Clarence Jordan and Koinonia Farm. Independently published, 2023. Hamblin, Robert. A Spool of Thread: A Novel. Independently published, 2021. Hamblin, Robert. Still More: Poems. Independently published, 2023. Hamblin, Robert. Summer of '51: A Novel. Independently published, 2022. Hamblin, Robert. This House, This Town: One Couple's Love Affair with an Old House and a Historic Town. Cape Girardeau: Southeast Missouri State University Press, 2010. Hamblin, Robert. We Smile as We Go: Poems. Independently published, 2022. Hamblin, Robert. When You Can Throw from Deep Short: A Novel. Independently published, 2021. Hamblin, Robert. Win or Win: A Season with Ron Shumate. Cape Girardeau: Southeast Missouri University Foundation, 1992. Hamblin, Robert. Words in Pictures: Ekphrastic Poems. Independently published, 2023. Hamblin, Robert. Words in Pictures II: Ekphrastic Poems. Independently published, 2023. Hamblin, Robert. Words in Pictures III: Ekphrastic Poems. Independently published, 2024. Hamblin, Robert. Words in Pictures IV: Ekphrastic Poems. Independently published, 2025. Hamblin, Robert W., and Ann J. Abadie, eds. Faulkner in the Twenty-First Century: Faulkner and Yoknapatawpha, 2000. Jackson: University Press of Mississippi, 2003. Reissued in paperback edition, 2017. Hamblin, Robert W., and Charles A. Peek, eds. A William Faulkner Encyclopedia. Westport, Conn.: Greenwood Press, 1999. Japanese edition: Trans. Mizuho Terrasawa. Tokyo: Yushodo Press, 2006. Hamblin, Robert W., and Christopher Rieger, eds. Faulkner and Chopin. Cape Girardeau: Southeast Missouri State University Press, 2010. Hamblin, Robert W., and Christopher Rieger, eds. Faulkner and Morrison. Cape Girardeau: Southeast Missouri State University Press, 2012; Chinese edition, 2020. Hamblin, Robert W., and Louis Daniel Brodsky, eds. Selections from the William Faulkner Collection of Louis Daniel Brodsky. Charlottesville: University Press of Virginia, 1979. Hamblin, Robert W., and Melanie Speight, eds. Faulkner and Twain. Cape Girardeau: Southeast Missouri State University Press, 2009. Hamblin, Robert W., and Michael Lund. “About a little girl”: A William Carlos Williams Poem and Its Legacy. Cape Girardeau: Southeast Missouri State University Press, 2008. Neumeyer, Tom, and Robert Hamblin. A Momentary Stay: Photographs and Poems. Independently published, 2025. Nowak, Bryan, and Robert Hamblin. Nature as Poet: Inspiring Photography and Haiku Poetry. Independently published, 2021. Peek, Charles A., and Robert W. Hamblin, eds. A Companion to Faulkner Studies. Westport, Conn.: Greenwood Press, 2004. Rieger, Christopher, and Robert W. Hamblin, eds. Faulkner and Warren. Cape Girardeau: Southeast Missouri State University Press, 2015.
