= James Hamblin =

James Hamblin may refer to:

- James Hamblin (cricketer) (born 1978), English cricketer
- James Hamblin (journalist) (born 1983), American journalist and physician
- James Hamblin (ice hockey) (born 1999), Canadian ice hockey player
