= Aaron Lansky =

American book collector

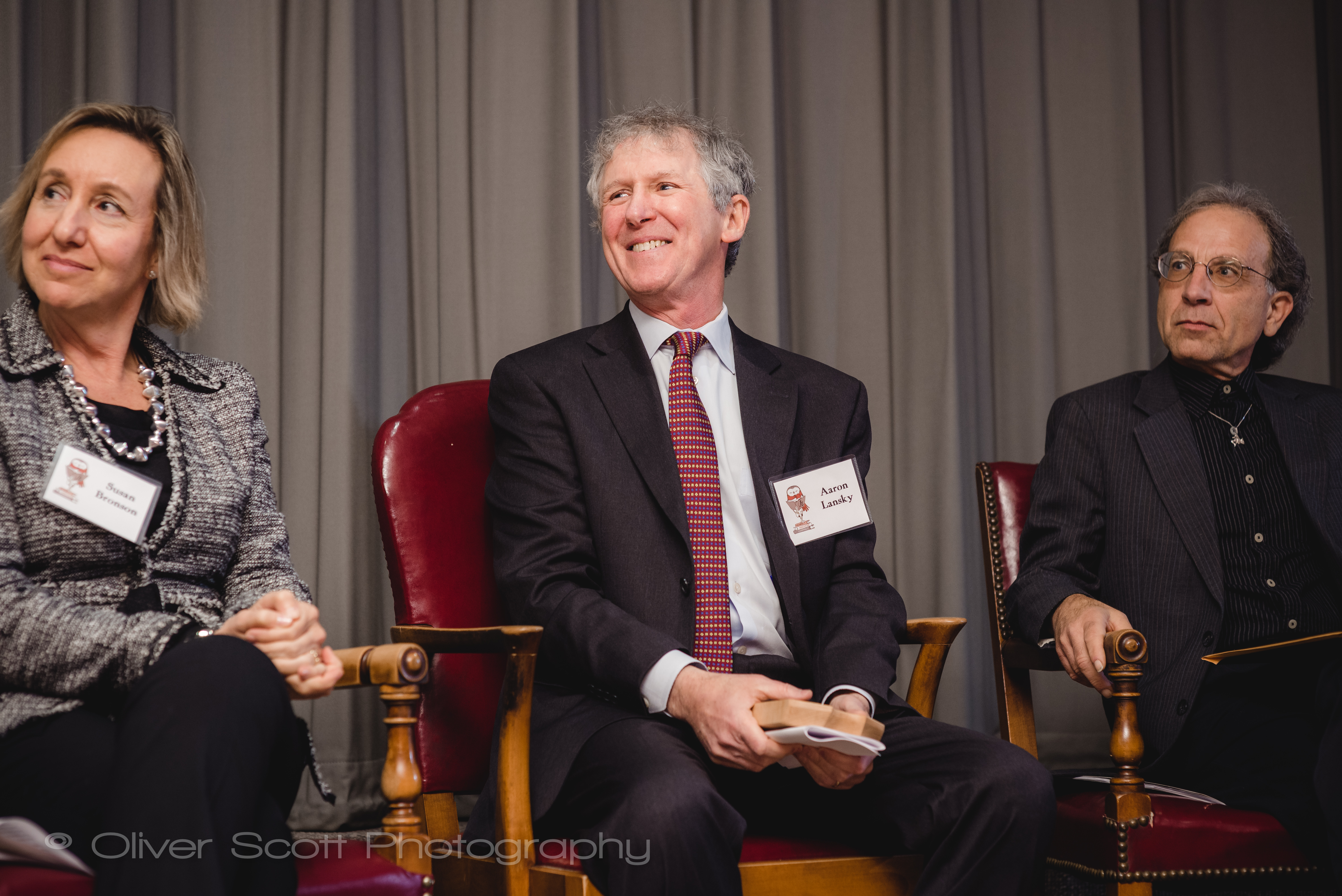
- Aaron Lansky at the Sammy Awards in 2016
- Born: June 17, 1955 (age 71); New Bedford, Massachusetts, USA
- Education: Hampshire College (BA, 1977); McGill University (MA)
- Known for: Founding the Yiddish Book Center

Aaron Lansky (born 17 June 1955, New Bedford, Massachusetts) is the founder of the Yiddish Book Center, an organization he created to help salvage Yiddish language publications. He received a MacArthur Fellowship in 1989 for his work.

== Education ==
Lanksy was born on June 17, 1955, in New Bedford, Massachusetts. He was first exposed to Yiddish through his Jewish grandparents, who had immigrated to the United States.

Lansky began classes at Hampshire College in 1973. He became interested in studying Jewish cultural history after taking a class on the Holocaust, one of the first such classes offered in the country. He began studying Yiddish with Professor Jules Piccus at the University of Massachusetts Amherst. He graduated from Hampshire in 1977 with a Bachelor of Arts in modern Jewish history, and earned a Master of Arts in East European Jewish studies at McGill University in Montreal.

He was awarded honorary degrees from Amherst College in 1998 and Hebrew Union College, as well as an honorary Doctor of Letters from the State University of New York at Brockport in 2000.

== Career ==
While a graduate student at McGill University, Lansky founded the Yiddish Book Center in 1980. With approximately 1.5 million volumes, the collection serves as the foundation of an institution encompassing Yiddish-language instruction, university scholarships, translator training programmes, academic conferences, a publishing house for translated works, oral history archives, a podcast, and a digitised library of classic and lesser-known Yiddish texts.

Lansky is the author of Outwitting History (2004), a memoir compiling his experiences of founding the Yiddish Book Center and collecting Yiddish books from the 1980s to the early 2000s. It won the 2005 Massachusetts Book Award. A children's book called The Book Rescuer: How a Mensch from Massachusetts Saved Yiddish Literature for Generations to Come also tells his story.

Lansky retired from the Yiddish Book Center in June 2025, after 45 years as its president. He lives in Stockbridge, Massachusetts, with his wife, Gail, and has stated that he intends to devote his retirement to writing and study.
