= Nicholas Basbanes =

American author

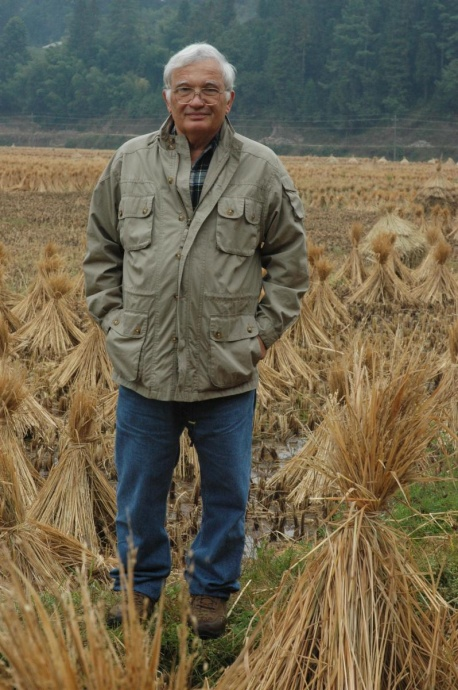
- Basbanes in China conducting research for his book, On Paper: The Everything of Its Two-Thousand-Year History.
- Born: Nicholas Andrew Basbanes; May 25, 1943 (age 83); Lowell, Massachusetts
- Education: Bates College (BA); Pennsylvania State University (MA)
- Occupations: Author, journalist and lecturer
- Spouse: Constance Valentzas
- Children: Barbara Basbanes Richter, Nicole Basbanes Claire
- Writing career
- Language: English
- Genres: Nonfiction, journalism
- Subjects: Authors, books and book culture
- Website: nicholasbasbanes.com

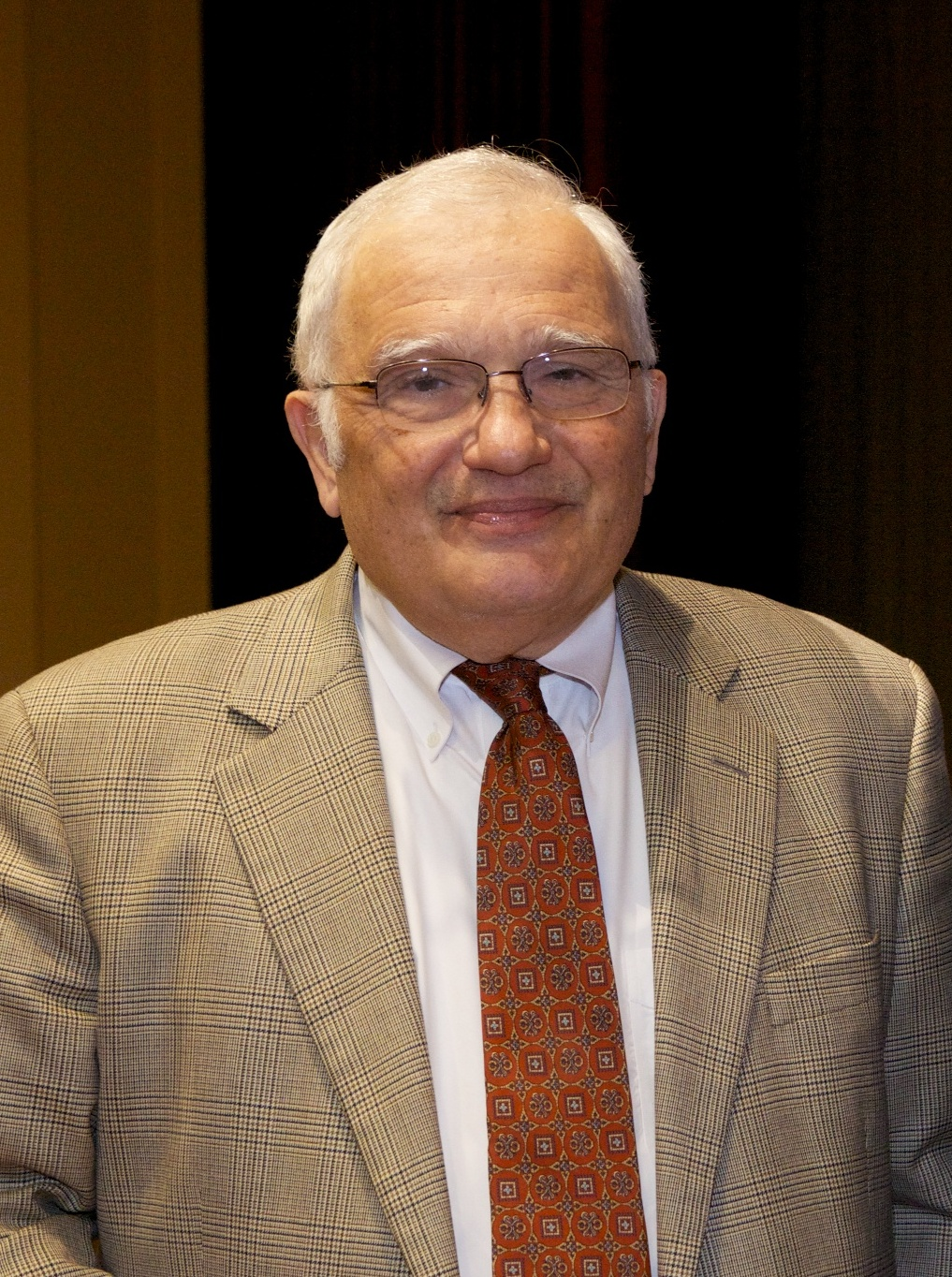
Nicholas A. Basbanes (National Archives)

Nicholas Andrew Basbanes (born May 25, 1943, in Lowell, Massachusetts) is an American author who writes and lectures about authors, books, and book culture. His subjects include the "eternal passion for books" (A Gentle Madness); the history and future of libraries (Patience & Fortitude); the "willful destruction of books" and the "determined effort to rescue them" (A Splendor of Letters); "the power of the printed word to stir the world" (Every Book Its Reader); the invention of paper and its effect on civilization (On Paper: The Everything of Its Two-Thousand-Year History), and an exploration of Longfellow's life and art (Cross of Snow: A Life of Henry Wadsworth Longfellow).

== Early life and education ==
Basbanes is the son of two first-generation Greek-Americans. He graduated from Lowell High School in 1961 and earned a bachelor's degree in English from Bates College in Lewiston, Maine in 1965. Following a year of graduate study at Pennsylvania State University, he did research for his master's thesis in Washington, D.C. then entered U. S. Navy Officer Candidate School in Newport, Rhode Island. He attended the Defense Information School in the spring of 1968 and earned his master's degree in journalism in 1969 while serving aboard the aircraft carrier USS Oriskany (CV-34) during the first of two combat deployments he made to Yankee Station in the Gulf of Tonkin, off the coast of Vietnam.

== Career ==
=== Early journalism ===
Discharged from active duty in 1971, Basbanes went to work as a general assignment reporter for The Evening Gazette in Worcester, Massachusetts, specializing in investigative journalism. In 1978, he was appointed books editor of a sister publication, the Worcester Sunday Telegram, a full-time position that included writing a weekly column.

Due to cost-cutting measures, the Telegram, then known as the Telegram & Gazette, removed its book section in 1990. When Basbanes left the newspaper later in 1991 to complete his first book, he continued writing the column and distributed it through Literary Features Syndicate, an agency he formed that placed it in more than thirty publications nationwide. He writes the "Gently Mad" column for Fine Books & Collections magazine and lectures on book-related subjects.

=== Books ===
Basbanes' first book, A Gentle Madness: Bibliophiles, Bibliomanes, and the Eternal Passion for Books, was published in 1995. The topic was originally dismissed as too arcane for a general readership by many New York editors who had passed on the opportunity to publish it, but the book later found sizable success with multiple printings. Michael Dirda of The Washington Post called it an "ingratiating and altogether enjoyable book", praising the book's "wonderful gallery of modern eccentrics" despite its occasional lapses in literary history. A Gentle Madness was named a New York Times notable book of the year and was a finalist for the National Book Critics Circle Award in nonfiction for 1995. In 2010, Allison Hoover Bartlett writing for the Wall Street Journal named it one of the most influential works about book collecting published in the twentieth century.

By 2003, with the publication of A Splendor of Letters, Basbanes was already acknowledged as a leading authority on books and book culture. One reviewer commented, "No other writer has traced the history of the book so thoroughly or so engagingly," and Yale University Press chose him to write its 2008 centennial history, A World of Letters, which chronicled the inside stories of its classic books from conception to production.

Basbanes' ninth book, On Paper: The Everything of Its Two-Thousand-Year History, is not only a consideration of paper as a principal medium for the transmission of text over the past ten centuries, but also a wider examination of the ubiquitous material itself. The eight-year project, which was released in October 2013, was supported in part by the award of a National Endowment for the Humanities Research Fellowship in 2008. It was named a notable book by the American Library Association, and was one of three finalists for the 2014 Andrew Carnegie Medal for Excellence in Nonfiction.

In July 2015, Basbanes received one of the inaugural grants from the Public Scholar program of the National Endowment for the Humanities in support of his tenth book, Cross of Snow: A Life of Henry Wadsworth Longfellow, published in 2020. The Public Scholar program is designed to promote the publication of scholarly nonfiction books for general audiences. Cross of Snow was named one of the best nonfiction books of 2020 by the Christian Science Monitor, one of the Books of the Year 2020 by TLS and was selected as an Honors Book in the non-fiction category by the Massachusetts Center for the Book.

=== Litigation ===
On January 5, 2024, Basbanes and Nicholas Gage, nonfiction book author and journalist, sued Microsoft and OpenAI in a proposed class action complaint filed in the U. S. District Court for the Southern District of New York. The lawsuit alleges that the defendants “stole” writers’ copyrighted works to help build AI chatbot ChatGPT, an artificial intelligence system they say is worth billions of dollars. The class is defined as all nonfiction writers in the United States, many of them trained as journalists, “who are authors or legal beneficial owners” of copyrights that have or are being used by the defendants to “train their large language models” and it estimates the class to include tens of thousands of people. It seeks damages of up to $150,000 for each work infringed. This lawsuit follows several other suits and letters of complaint filed alleging copyright infringement not only by these defendants, but also by Meta Platforms, Alphabet and IBM. These suits by authors and performers, and actions by The Authors Guild, The Writers Guild of America and the Screen Actors Guild are seeking protection for creators over AI use.

Considered too similar to lawsuits filed late last year, this January complaint has been consolidated into a case brought by other nonfiction writers as well as fiction writers represented by the Authors Guild.

Open AI issued a statement, "We respect the rights of content creators and owners and are committed to working with them to ensure they benefit from AI technology and new revenue models."

=== Archives ===
The Cushing Memorial Library and Archives of Texas A&M University acquired Basbanes' papers as the Nicholas A. Basbanes Collection in December 2015. The collection includes archives of Basbanes' professional career as an author and literary journalist, as well as a significant portion of his personal library. Highlights of the collection include research materials related to the writing of his nine books and approximately eight hundred books inscribed to him over the course of his career.

Two selections of his literary journalism were collected in Editions & Impressions (2007) and About the Author (2010).

His collection of books resides in North Grafton, Massachusetts.

== Bibliography ==
- A Gentle Madness: Bibliophiles, Bibliomanes, and the Eternal Passion for Books, New York: Henry Holt & Co., 1995. (ISBN 9780805061765); Durham, NC: Fine Books Press, 2012 (updated print edition, and first electronic edition) (ISBN 9780979949166)
- Patience & Fortitude: A Roving Chronicle of Book People, Book Places, and Book Culture, New York: HarperCollins, 2001 (ISBN 9780060196950
- Among the Gently Mad: Perspectives and Strategies for the Book-Hunter in the 21st Century, New York: Henry Holt & Co., 2002 (ISBN 9780805051599
- A Splendor of Letters: The Permanence of Books in an Impermanent World, New York: HarperCollins, 2003 (ISBN 9780060082871)
- Every Book its Reader: The Power of the Printed Word to Stir the World, New York: HarperCollins, 2005 (ISBN 9780060593247)
- Editions & Impressions: Twenty Years on the Book Beat, Durham, N.C.: Fine Books Press, 2007 (ISBN 9780979949104)
- A World of Letters: Yale University Press, 1908-2008, New Haven: Yale University Press, 2008 (ISBN 9780300115987)
- About the Author: Inside the Creative Process, Durham, NC: Fine Books Press, 2010 (ISBN 9780979949135)
- On Paper: The Everything of Its Two-Thousand-Year History, New York: Alfred A. Knopf, 2013 (ISBN 9780307266422)
- Cross of Snow: A Life of Henry Wadsworth Longfellow, New York: Alfred A. Knopf, 2020 (ISBN 9781101875148)

== Selected journalism and op-ed essays ==
- "Bibliophilia: Still No Cure in Sight", New York Times, April 14, 1991.
- "Fragile Guardians of Culture", Los Angeles Times, January 12, 2004.
- "Honorable Death for a Rusty Warrior", Los Angeles Times, May 6, 2004.
- "Bibliophiles Inside the Wire", Los Angeles Times, April 24, 2006.
- "Iraq: The Cradle of the Written Word", Christian Science Monitor, May 8, 2006.
- "When We Said Goodbye to the USS Oriskany", Christian Science Monitor, May 26, 2006.
- "The Bard Out Loud", Bates Magazine, June 2007, reprinted from The Book That Changed My Life: 71 Remarkable Writers Celebrate the Books That Matter Most to Them (Gotham, 2006).
- "A Paperless Society? Not So Fast." Los Angeles Times, December 8, 2013.
- "Paper Trail" Humanities, January/February 2014, Volume 35, Number 1.
- "Summer Camp for Book Nerds" Humanities, November/December 2014, Volume 35, Number 6.
- "A Romantic Notion: One Scholar's Lifetime of Devotion to the Letters of Robert Browning and Elizabeth Barrett Browning" Humanities, September/October 2015 | Volume 36, Number 5.
- “On the Gentle Madness of Bibliophilia in the Modern Age” Livemint, April 12, 2019.
- " 'The Hunt for History' Review: A Textual Detective" Wall Street Journal, March 14, 2020
- "A Beautiful Ending"Humanities, Summer 2020, Volume 41, Issue 3.
- "The Grooming of a Harvard Hispanist: George Ticknor’s Mentorship of Henry Wadsworth Longfellow"Observatorio, Instituto Cervantes at the Faculty of Arts and Sciences of Harvard University, February 3, 2023.
