= Hamlin, Kansas =

City in Brown County, Kansas

- City
- Location within Brown County and Kansas

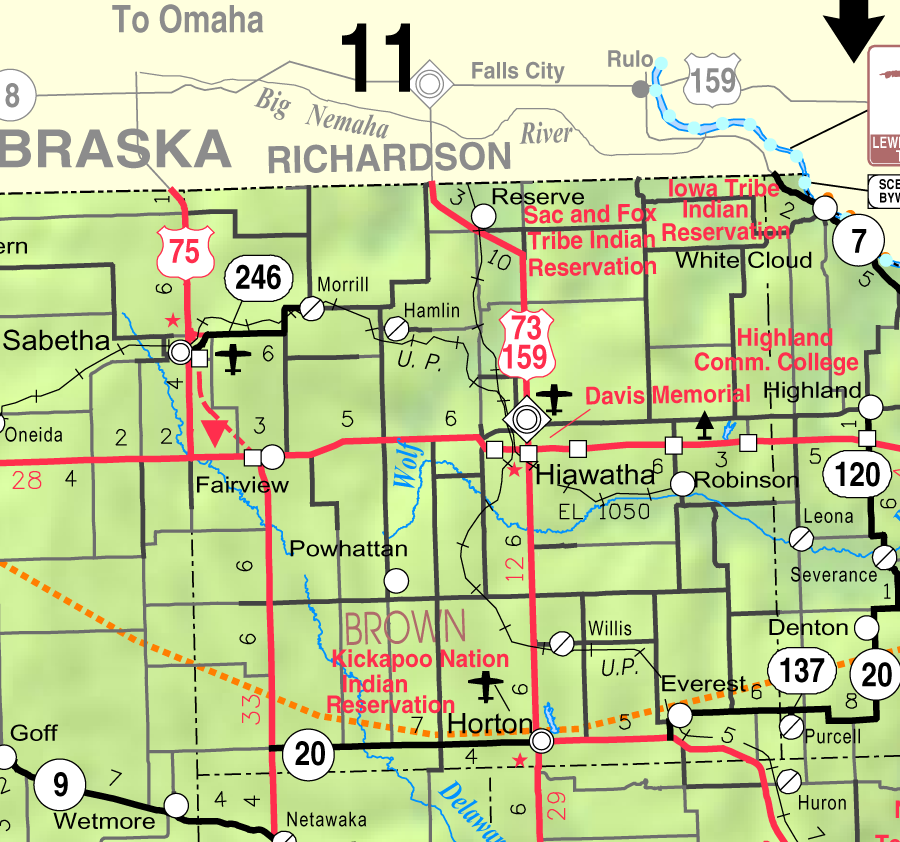
- KDOT map of Brown County (legend)
- Coordinates: 39°54′54″N 95°37′39″W
- Country: United States
- State: Kansas
- County: Brown
- Founded: 1870
- Platted: 1870
- Incorporated: 1889
- Named for: Hannibal Hamlin

Government
  - Mayor: Michael Dyke

Area
  - Total: 0.089 sq mi (0.23 km^{2})
  - Land: 0.089 sq mi (0.23 km^{2})
  - Water: 0 sq mi (0.00 km^{2})
- Elevation: 994 ft (303 m)

Population (2020)
  - Total: 25
  - Density: 280/sq mi (110/km^{2})
- Time zone: UTC-6 (CST)
  - Summer (DST): UTC-5 (CDT)
- Area code: 785
- FIPS code: 20-29700
- GNIS ID: 2394279

Hamlin is a city in Brown County, Kansas, United States. As of the 2020 census, the population of the city was 25.

== History ==
Hamlin was laid out in 1870. It was named in honor of Hannibal Hamlin, Abraham Lincoln's vice-president.

== Geography ==
According to the United States Census Bureau, the city has a total area of 0.09 square miles (0.23 km^{2}), all land.

== Demographics ==
Historical population
Census	Pop.	Note	%±
1880	135		—
1890	216		60.0%
1900	258		19.4%
1910	208		−19.4%
1920	211		1.4%
1930	183		−13.3%
1940	174		−4.9%
1950	118		−32.2%
1960	99		−16.1%
1970	95		−4.0%
1980	80		−15.8%
1990	50		−37.5%
2000	53		6.0%
2010	46		−13.2%
2020	25		−45.7%
U.S. Decennial Census

=== 2020 census ===
The 2020 United States census counted 25 people, 9 households, and 6 families in Hamlin. The population density was 287.4 per square mile (110.9/km^{2}). There were 14 housing units at an average density of 160.9 per square mile (62.1/km^{2}). The racial makeup was 88.0% (22) white or European American (88.0% non-Hispanic white), 0.0% (0) black or African-American, 8.0% (2) Native American or Alaska Native, 0.0% (0) Asian, 0.0% (0) Pacific Islander or Native Hawaiian, 0.0% (0) from other races, and 4.0% (1) from two or more races. Hispanic or Latino of any race was 0.0% (0) of the population.

Of the 9 households, 22.2% had children under the age of 18; 44.4% were married couples living together; 11.1% had a female householder with no spouse or partner present. 22.2% of households consisted of individuals and 11.1% had someone living alone who was 65 years of age or older. The average household size was 3.5 and the average family size was 3.5.

32.0% of the population was under the age of 18, 4.0% from 18 to 24, 20.0% from 25 to 44, 32.0% from 45 to 64, and 12.0% who were 65 years of age or older. The median age was 38.5 years. For every 100 females, there were 78.6 males. For every 100 females ages 18 and older, there were 88.9 males.

The 2016–2020 5-year American Community Survey estimates show that the median household income was $28,750 (with a margin of error of +/- $3,379) and the median family income was $28,750 (+/- $3,379). Males had a median income of $12,000 (+/- $6,271) versus $25,625 (+/- $8,612) for females.

=== 2010 census ===
As of the census of 2010, there were 46 people, 19 households, and 13 families residing in the city. The population density was 511.1 inhabitants per square mile (197.3/km^{2}). There were 24 housing units at an average density of 266.7 per square mile (103.0/km^{2}). The racial makeup of the city was 95.7% White, 2.2% African American, and 2.2% from other races. Hispanic or Latino of any race were 8.7% of the population.

There were 19 households, of which 26.3% had children under the age of 18 living with them, 57.9% were married couples living together, 5.3% had a female householder with no husband present, 5.3% had a male householder with no wife present, and 31.6% were non-families. 31.6% of all households were made up of individuals, and 5.3% had someone living alone who was 65 years of age or older. The average household size was 2.42 and the average family size was 3.00.

The median age in the city was 44 years. 23.9% of residents were under the age of 18; 2.1% were between the ages of 18 and 24; 28.3% were from 25 to 44; 26% were from 45 to 64; and 19.6% were 65 years of age or older. The gender makeup of the city was 56.5% male and 43.5% female.

=== 2000 census ===
As of the census of 2000, there were 53 people, 19 households, and 15 families residing in the city. The population density was 538.3 inhabitants per square mile (207.8/km^{2}). There were 26 housing units at an average density of 264.1 per square mile (102.0/km^{2}). The racial makeup of the city was 100.00% White.

There were 19 households, out of which 42.1% had children under the age of 18 living with them, 52.6% were married couples living together, 31.6% had a female householder with no husband present, and 15.8% were non-families. 15.8% of all households were made up of individuals, and 5.3% had someone living alone who was 65 years of age or older. The average household size was 2.79 and the average family size was 3.06.

In the city, the population was spread out, with 32.1% under the age of 18, 32.1% from 25 to 44, 15.1% from 45 to 64, and 20.8% who were 65 years of age or older. The median age was 36 years. For every 100 females, there were 96.3 males. For every 100 females age 18 and over, there were 89.5 males.

The median income for a household in the city was $27,500, and the median income for a family was $34,375. Males had a median income of $18,750 versus $46,250 for females. The per capita income for the city was $14,813. None of the population and none of the families were below the poverty line.

== Notable people ==
- Ellen Palmer Allerton (1835–1893), Walls of Corn poet, interred at Hamlin Cemetery
