= Henry Thomas Hamblin =

English Christian mystic (1873–1958)

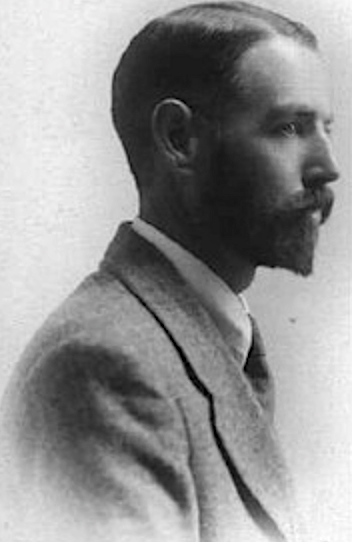
- Hamblin in 1900
- Born: March 19, 1873; London, England
- Died: October 28, 1958 (aged 85); Bosham
- Occupation: Author
- Writing career
- Subject: Mental science
- Notable works: Dynamic Thought; The Power of Thought; Within You is the Power
- Movement: New Thought
- Website: hamblinvisionpublishing.com

Henry Thomas Hamblin (19 March 1873 – 28 October 1958) was an English mystic, New Thought author, editor, and founder of The Science of Thought Review. A prominent British exponent of applied spiritual philosophy in the early twentieth century, he taught that right thinking in harmony with universal spiritual law produces health, sufficiency, character, and success. He also founded the Science of Thought Institute in London and contributed extensively to Arthur F. Sheldon’s The Business Philosopher magazine.

== Early life and business career ==
Hamblin was born at Walworth, London, to Ebenezer Hamblin and Mary Ann Hamblin. He was raised in poor circumstances, and because of limited financial resources he received little formal education in his early years. He worked in various occupations before deciding to train as an optician. Despite debt and uncertain prospects, he qualified and eventually established a successful optician’s business in Wigmore Street, London.

Although financially prosperous, Hamblin later described this period as one of inward dissatisfaction. He experienced severe depression and recurring psychological distress at the height of his commercial success. Eventually he relinquished his business and retired to the countryside, a decision he associated with the cessation of recurring night terrors.

A further turning point in his life was the sudden death of his ten-year-old son. This event intensified his spiritual search and deepened his conviction that external achievement alone could not bring lasting fulfillment.

== Mystical experience and spiritual development ==
Hamblin reported a series of mystical experiences throughout his life in which he felt immersed in a Divine Presence characterized by profound peace and love. He described states in which fear and anxiety vanished and a sense of being sustained by an eternal spiritual reality replaced ordinary consciousness. Though raised within a religious household, he concluded that formal creeds did not provide the answers he sought. He turned inward, developing a philosophy centered on the immanence of divine law and the creative power of thought.

== Spiritual philosophy ==
Hamblin’s teaching, often described as Applied Right Thinking, rested on the conviction that the universe is governed by immutable spiritual law and that disorder in life arises from mental departure from inherent harmony. In shaping this system, he was strongly influenced by the teachings of Dr. Herbert A. Parkyn of the Chicago School of Psychology, particularly Parkyn’s emphasis on the law of suggestion and the disciplined direction of thought. Hamblin taught that thought is the primary cause of outward conditions and that the subconscious mind acts as a creative agency shaped by habitual mental direction. In his view, health, sufficiency, joy, and achievement are the natural state of human life when one lives in harmony with what he termed Cosmic Law.

He consistently maintained that individuals are responsible for their circumstances through their mental attitudes. The law of cause and effect, as he presented it, operates through thought. By mastering thought, disciplining imagination, and cultivating character, a person could redirect the forces of life. At the same time, he rejected the idea that mental visualization alone could replace work. Constructive thought, he argued, must lead to constructive action, and enduring success depends upon character, discipline, and perseverance.

=== Hamblin's own words on his philosophy: ===
"What for lack of a better title is termed 'Science of Thought' is based on the ancient truth that an interior harmony and order exists, that it is ever present, and that it is the eternal, unchanging Reality. It follows that the disorders of life are due to a departure on man's part from this inherent harmony and order. Life is governed by certain laws which, if obeyed, bring forth health, wholeness, joy and sufficiency of all good. It is natural for life to be harmonious, orderly and beautiful. We do not have to create these states by huge effort; they are the natural order of things, which will manifest as soon as we cease to distort life, so to speak. We can distort a tennis ball by squeezing it, but as soon as we let it go it flies back to its original round shape, simply because that is its natural form. We do not have to make the ball round: all that we have to do is leave off distorting it". From Simple Talks on Science of Thought 1928

Over time, the emphasis of his writing shifted. Earlier works stressed practical methods of changing one’s life through right thinking and faith. Later writings increasingly emphasized the realization of an inner consciousness of God as a living and present reality.

== Author, editor, and institute founder ==
Hamblin began publishing in the early 1920s. One of his best-known books, Within You Is the Power, achieved wide circulation and established him as a leading British New Thought writer. Across his career he authored more than forty books and booklets, many of which were translated and distributed internationally.

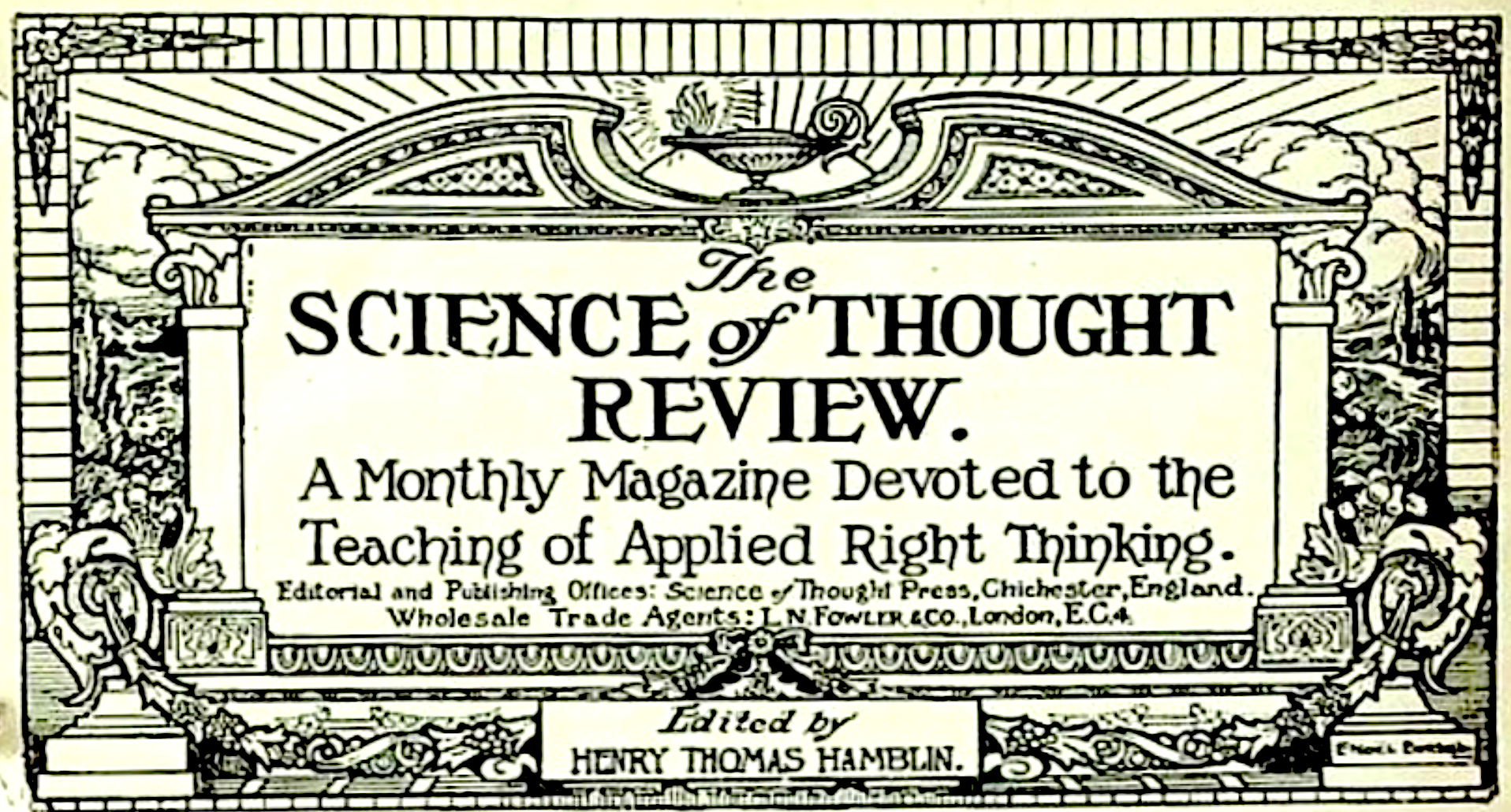
Science of Thought Review. Edited By Henry Thomas Hamblin

He founded and edited The Science of Thought Review, a magazine devoted to applied spiritual philosophy. The publication gained substantial circulation and later continued under subsequent titles. From Bosham House near Chichester, he directed his publishing activities and teaching work.

The Science of Thought Review became New Vision in September 1999 and subsequently The Hamblin Vision in March 2017. The final issue of The Hamblin Vision was in the summer of 2025.

Hamblin also founded the Science of Thought Institute in London, which functioned as an organizational and instructional center for his system of applied spiritual philosophy. Through the Institute and his publications, he sought to unite mystical realization with practical ethics and disciplined living.

== Contribution to The Business Philosopher ==
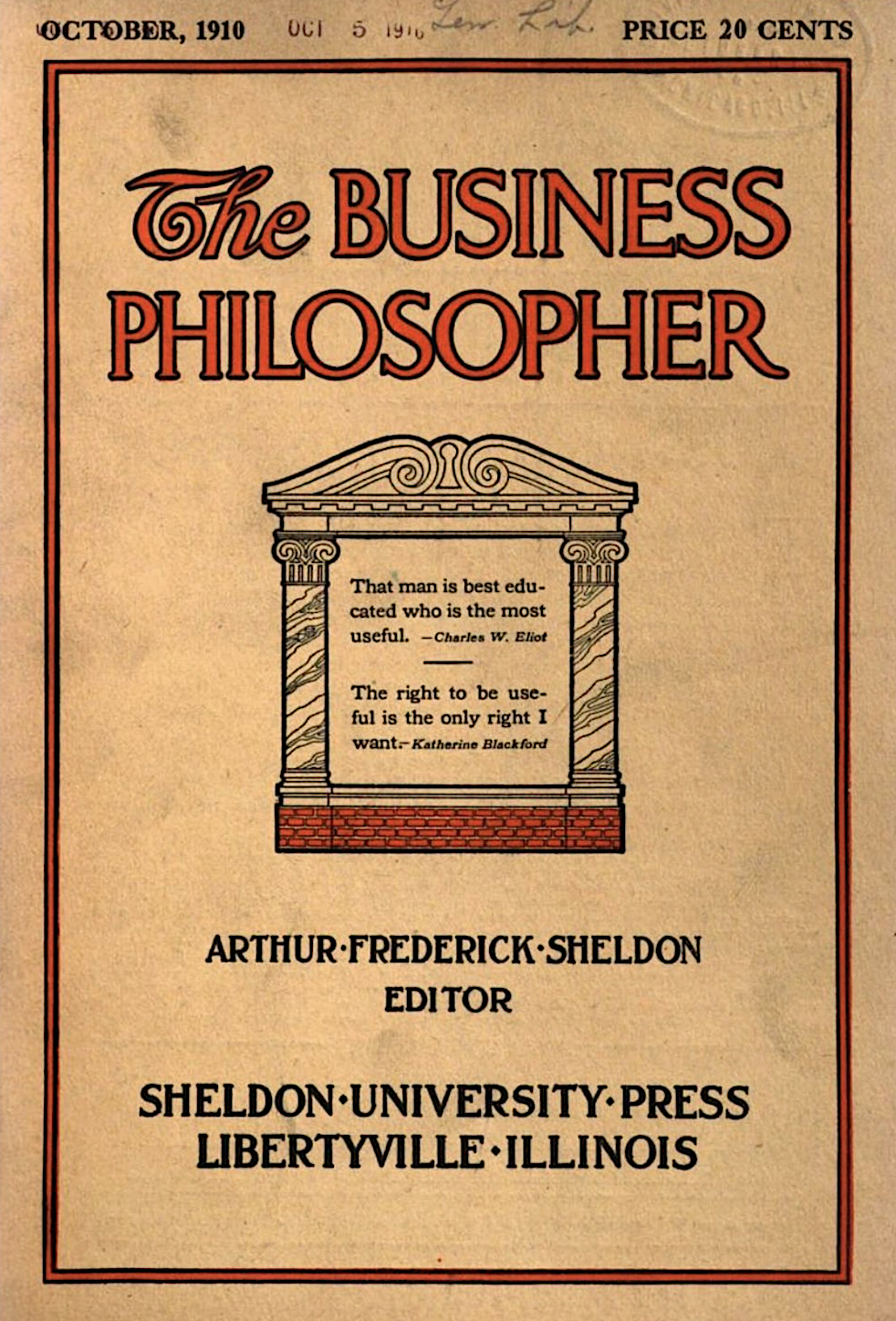
The Business Philosopher magazine

In 1922 Hamblin became a prominent contributor to The Business Philosopher, the magazine founded by Arthur F. Sheldon. His extensive series, published in multiple installments throughout the year, appeared under the general title "The Fundamentals of True Success." The series included discussions of success as the power within, ambition and character building, opportunity, work and action, and the value of optimism and cheerfulness.

Drawing upon his own experience as a businessman, Hamblin presented success not as a matter of luck or circumstance but as the application of spiritual law through disciplined thought, character, and sustained effort. He argued that imagination without action is ineffective, that work is indispensable, and that character is tested most severely after success has been achieved. The articles were also printed in his own magazine, reinforcing the connection between spiritual philosophy and practical business ethics.

== The Hamblin Trust ==
To preserve and continue his work, the Hamblin Trust was established as a registered charity and limited company. Registered Charity Number 1133567 and Registered Company Number 06927379. The Trust maintained Hamblin’s former residence at Bosham, including Bosham Lodge and later Bosham House with an extension known as Hamblin Hall. In May 2023 the property was sold, after which the Trust continued its activities online. External operations ceased in September 2025, with closure planned for December 2025.

The Hamblin Trust site was sold to Green Door Yoga in May 2023 after which time the trust continued its work online at www.thehamblinvision.org.uk

== Later life and legacy ==
Hamblin continued writing and teaching until his death in 1958. His philosophy integrated mysticism, mental discipline, and practical ethics, presenting spiritual law as the foundation not only of inner life but of business and social conduct. He maintained that truth is timeless and that human life, rightly directed, can express harmony, health, sufficiency, and achievement.

Hamblin died on 28 October 1958. He was buried in Holy Trinity Churchyard in Bosham, West Sussex. He was survived by his wife, Eva Elizabeth Harvey Hamblin, and by two children, Herbert Wilson Hamblin and Joan Grace Hamblin. A third child, his son Richard Harvey Hamblin, died in 1918 at the age of ten.

More information can be found on his life and deeper spiritual understanding in Hamblin's autobiographies: The Story of My Life and My Search for Truth.

Hamblin was a prolific author, and his books are listed in the British Library catalogue over a period from 1921 up to 1956. He has over 40 titles to his name with a variety of books and booklets of different sizes, many translated into different languages and sold in Europe and America.

== Selected works ==
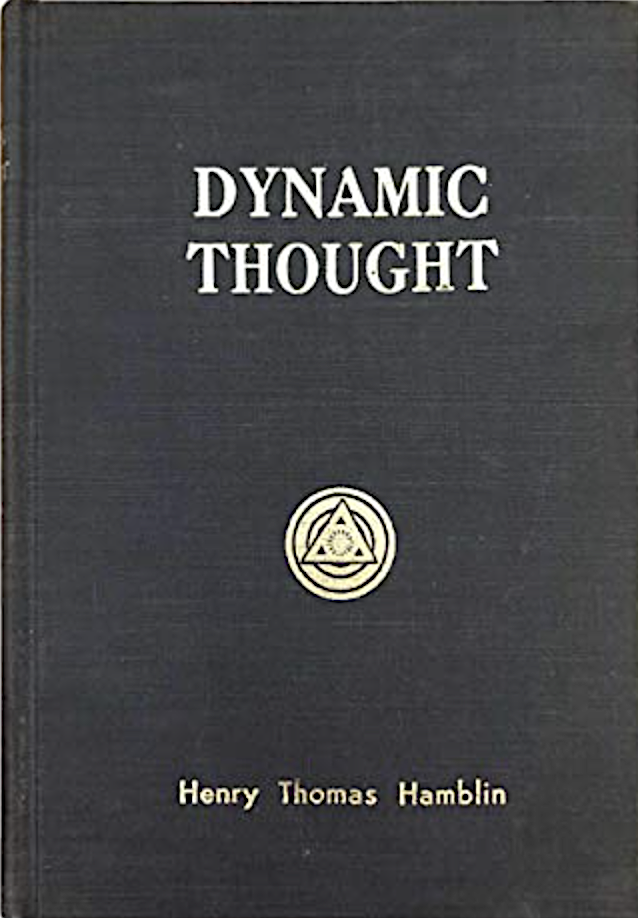
Dynamic Thought by Henry Thomas Hamblin. 1921. Yogi Publication Society.

Many of the old books are out of print and, to preserve the Hamblin legacy, the Hamblin Trust has been updating and reprinting many of Hamblin books over the period 2023 – 2025.

- The Fundamentals of True Success (1924)
- Right Thinking and its Application to Inward Attainment and Outward Achievement (1921)
- Dynamic Thought : Harmony, Health, Success through the Power of Right Thinking (3 editions published between 1921 and 1923)
- Divine Adjustment : How Divine Law works in our life (1937)
- The Life of the Spirit (6 editions published between 1920 and 2012)
- Tagiĝas [in Esperanto] (F.H. Emptage, College Press, Deal, Kent, no date)
- Life Without Strain (5 editions published between 1941 and 1974)
- The Power of Thought (1920)
- The Message of a Flower (10 editions published between 1921 and 1928)
- My Search for Truth (1938)
- The Story of My Life (Science of Thought Press 1947 – published for private circulation only)
- The Way of the Practical Mystic (Polair Publishing, 2004)
- Within You is the Power (1953)
