= Louis Daniel Brodsky =

American poet (1941–2014)

Louis Daniel Brodsky (Louis Brodsky, L. D. Brodsky) (April 17, 1941 – June 16, 2014) was an American poet, short story writer, and Faulkner scholar.

== Life ==
Louis Daniel Brodsky was born in St. Louis, Missouri, in 1941. He attended St. Louis Country Day School. After earning a B.A., magna cum laude, at Yale University in 1963, he received an M.A. in English from Washington University in St. Louis in 1967 and an M.A. in creative writing from San Francisco State University the following year. He married Jan Hofmann on July 8, 1970, and had two children.

From 1968 to 1987, while continuing to write poetry, he assisted in managing a 350-person men's clothing factory in Farmington, Missouri, and started one of the Midwest's first factory-outlet apparel chains. From 1980 to 1991, he taught English and creative writing, part-time, at Mineral Area College, in nearby Flat River. From 1987 onward, he lived in St. Louis with his wife, his daughter and son, and devoted himself to composing poems and short fictions.

Brodsky authored eighty-four volumes of poetry (five of which have been published in French by Éditions Gallimard) and twenty-five volumes of prose, including nine books of scholarship on William Faulkner and nine books of short fiction. His poems and essays have appeared in Harper’s, Faulkner Journal, Southern Review, Texas Quarterly, National Forum, American Scholar, Studies in Bibliography, Kansas Quarterly, Forum, Cimarron Review, and Literary Review, as well as in Ariel, Acumen, Orbis, New Welsh Review, Dalhousie Review, and other journals. His work has also been printed in five editions of the Anthology of Magazine Verse and Yearbook of American Poetry.

Brodsky's You Can’t Go Back, Exactly won the Center for Great Lakes Culture's Michigan State University 2004 best book of poetry award.

His most recent books of poetry include A Mississippi Trilogy and The Words of My Mouth and The Meditations of My Heart, which he wrote during his year-plus-long journey living with brain cancer. He died of cancer in June 2014.

== Bibliography ==
=== Poetry ===
(all published by Time Being Books, St. Louis, MO):

- Five Facets of Myself (1967)* (1995)
- The Easy Philosopher (1967)* (1995)
- A Hard Coming of It and Other Poems (1967)* (1995)
- The Foul Rag-and-Bone Shop (1967)* (1969, exp.)* (1995, exp.)
- Points in Time (1971)* (1995) (1996)
- Taking the Back Road Home (1972)* (1997) (2000)
- Trip to Tipton and Other Compulsions (1973)* (1997)
- The Talking Machine and Other Poems (1974)* (1997)
- Tiffany Shade (1974)* (1997)
- Trilogy: A Birth Cycle (1974) (1998)
- Cold Companionable Streams (1975)* (1999)
- Monday's Child (1975) (1998)
- Preparing for Incarnations (1975)* (1976, exp.) (1999) (1999, exp.)
- The Kingdom of Gewgaw (1976) (2000)
- Point of Americas II (1976) (1998)
- La Preciosa (1977) (2001)
- Stranded in the Land of Transients (1978) (2000)
- The Uncelebrated Ceremony of Pants-Factory Fatso (1978) (2001)
- Birds in Passage (1980) (2001)
- Résumé of a Scrapegoat (1980) (2001)
- Mississippi Vistas: Volume One of A Mississippi Trilogy(1983) (1990)
- You Can't Go Back, Exactly (1988, two eds.) (1989) (2003, exp.)
- The Thorough Earth (1989)
- Four and Twenty Blackbirds Soaring (1989)
- Falling from Heaven: Holocaust Poems of a Jew and a Gentile (with William Heyen) (1991)
- Forever, for Now: Poems for a Later Love (1991)
- Mistress Mississippi: Volume Three of A Mississippi Trilogy (1992)
- A Gleam in the Eye: Volume One of The Seasons of Youth (1992) (2009)
- Gestapo Crows: Holocaust Poems (1992)
- The Third Year's a Charm: Later-Love Poems (1993)*
- The Capital Café: Poems of Redneck, U.S.A. (1993)
- Disappearing in Mississippi Latitudes: Volume Two of A Mississippi Trilogy (1994)
- Variations on a Love Theme: Poems for Janie (1995)*
- A Mississippi Trilogy: A Poetic Saga of the South (1995)* (2013)
- Paper-Whites for Lady Jane: Poems of a Midlife Love Affair (1995)
- The Complete Poems of Louis Daniel Brodsky: Volume One, 1963-1967 (edited by Sheri L. Vandermolen) (1996)
- Three Early Books of Poems by Louis Daniel Brodsky, 1967-1969: The Easy Philosopher, A Hard Coming of It and Other Poems, and The Foul Rag-and-Bone Shop (edited by Sheri L. Vandermolen)(1997)
- The Eleventh Lost Tribe: Poems of the Holocaust (1998)
- Toward the Torah, Soaring: Poems of the Renascence of Faith (1998)
- Voice Within the Void: Poems of Homo supinus (2000)
- The Swastika Clock: Holocaust Poems (2000)* (2011)
- Rabbi Auschwitz: Poems Touching the Shoah (2000)* (2009)
- Shadow War: A Poetic Chronicle of September 11 and Beyond, Volume One (2001) (2004)
- The Complete Poems of Louis Daniel Brodsky: Volume Two, 1967-1976 (edited by Sheri L. Vandermolen) (2002)
- Shadow War: A Poetic Chronicle of September 11 and Beyond, Volume Two (2002) (2004)
- Shadow War: A Poetic Chronicle of September 11 and Beyond, Volume Three (2002) (2004)
- Shadow War: A Poetic Chronicle of September 11 and Beyond, Volume Four (2002) (2004)
- Shadow War: A Poetic Chronicle of September 11 and Beyond, Volume Five (2002) (2004)
- Regime Change: Poems of America's Showdown with Iraq, Volume One (2002)*
- Heavenward (2003)*
- Regime Change: Poems of America's Showdown with Iraq, Volume Two (2003)*
- Regime Change: Poems of America's Showdown with Iraq, Volume Three (2003)*
- The Location of the Unknown: Shoah Poems (2004)*
- The Complete Poems of Louis Daniel Brodsky: Volume Three, 1976-1980 (edited by Sheri L. Vandermolen) (2005)
- Peddler on the Road: Days in the Life of Willy Sypher (2005)
- Combing Florida's Shores: Poems of Two Lifetimes (2006)
- Showdown With a Cactus: Poems Chronicling the Prickly Struggle Between the Forces of Dubya-ness and Enlightenment, 2003-2006 (2006)
- A Transcendental Almanac: Poems of Nature (2006)
- Once upon a Small-Town Time: Poems of America's Heartland (2007)
- Still Wandering in the Wilderness: Poems of the Jewish Diaspora (2007)
- The World Waiting to Be: Poems About the Creative Process (2008)
- The Complete Poems of Louis Daniel Brodsky: Volume Four, 1981-1985 (edited by Sheri L. Vandermolen) (2008)
- Unser Kampf: Poems of the Final Solution (2008)*
- Dine-Rite: Breakfast Poems (2008)
- Rien Sans Amour: Love Poems for Jane (2009)*
- By Leaps and Bounds: Volume Two of The Seasons of Youth (2009)
- At Water's Edge: Poems of Lake Nebagamon, Volume One (2010)
- Seizing the Sun and Moon: Volume Three of The Seasons of Youth (2010)
- At Dock's End: Poems of Lake Nebagamon, Volume Two (2011)
- In the Liberation Camps: Poems of the Endlösung (2011)*
- Just Ours: Love Passages with Linda, Volume One (2011)
- Hopgrassers and Flutterbies: Volume Four of The Seasons of Youth (2011)
- Saul and Charlotte: Poems Commemorating a Father and Mother (2011)
- Each Other: Love Passages with Linda, Volume Three (2011)*
- Seiwa-en: Poems in the Japanese Garden (2012)*
- At Shore's Border: Poems of Lake Nebagamon, Volume Three (2012)
- Our Time: Love Passages with Linda, Volume Two (2012)
- We Two: Love Passages with Linda, Volume Four (2012)*
- You, Me: Love Passages with Linda, Volume Five (2012)*
- Burnt Offerings of the Thousand-Year Reich: Holocaust Poems (2012)*
- Eying Widening Horizons: Volume Five of The Seasons of Youth (2012)
- The Complete Poems of Louis Daniel Brodsky: Volume Five, 1986-1990 (edited by Sheri L. Vandermolen) (2013)(e-book only)
- The Words of My Mouth and The Meditations of My Heart: A Poetic Pilgrimage from Illness to Healing-Living (2014)

=== Bibliography ===
(coedited with Robert Hamblin)

- Selections from the William Faulkner Collection of Louis Daniel Brodsky: A Descriptive Catalogue (1979)
- Faulkner: A Comprehensive Guide to the Brodsky Collection, Volume I: The Biobibliography (1982)
- Faulkner: A Comprehensive Guide to the Brodsky Collection, Volume II: The Letters (1984)
- Faulkner: A Comprehensive Guide to the Brodsky Collection, Volume III: The De Gaulle Story (1984)
- Faulkner: A Comprehensive Guide to the Brodsky Collection, Volume IV: Battle Cry (1985)
- Faulkner: A Comprehensive Guide to the Brodsky Collection, Volume V: Manuscripts and Documents (1989)
- Country Lawyer and Other Stories for the Screen by William Faulkner (1987)
- Stallion Road: A Screenplay by William Faulkner (1989)

=== Biography ===
- William Faulkner, Life Glimpses (1990)

=== Fiction ===
- Between Grief and Nothing (novel) (1964)*
- Between the Heron and the Wren (novel) (1965)*
- Dink Phlager's Alligator and Other Stories (1966)*
- The Drift of Things (novel) (1966)*
- Vineyard's Toys (novel) (1967)*
- The Bindle Stiffs (novel) (1968)*
- Catchin' the Drift o' the Draft (short fictions) (Time Being Books, 1999)
- This Here's a Merica (short fictions) (Time Being Books, 1999)
- Yellow Bricks (short fictions) (Time Being Books, 1999)
- Leaky Tubs (short fictions) (Time Being Books, 2001)
- Nuts to You! (short fictions) (Time Being Books, 2004)
- Rated Xmas (short fictions) (Time Being Books, 2004)
- Pigskinizations (short fictions) (Time Being Books, 2005)
- With One Foot in the Butterfly Farm (short fictions) (Time Being Books, 2009)
- Getting to Unknow the Neighbors (short fictions) (Time Being Books, 2011)

=== Memoir ===
- The Adventures of the Night Riders, Better Known as the Terrible Trio (with Richard Milsten) (1961)*

(* unpublished text)
