= Global Knowledge, Memory and Communication =

- Discipline: Library science
- Language: English
- Edited by: Judith Broady-Preston

Publication details
- History: 1927-present
- Publisher: Emerald Group Publishing
- Frequency: 9/year
- ISO 4: Find out here

Indexing
- ISSN: 0024-2535
- LCCN: 33037938
- OCLC no.: 185275449

Links
- Journal homepage

Global Knowledge, Memory and Communication (GKMC) (formerly known as Library Review) is an academic journal which was established in 1927. This journal focuses on social sciences, specific to library and information sciences. The journal is published nine times a year by Emerald Group Publishing. The editor-in-chief is Judith Broady-Preston (Aberystwyth University).
