= Hamlin Township =

Hamlin Township may refer to:

- Hamlin Township, Audubon County, Iowa
- Hamlin Township, Brown County, Kansas
- Hamlin Township, Eaton County, Michigan
- Hamlin Township, Mason County, Michigan
- Hamlin Township, Lac qui Parle County, Minnesota
- Hamlin Township, Nelson County, North Dakota, in Nelson County, North Dakota
- Hamlin Township, McKean County, Pennsylvania
- Hamlin Township, Hamlin County, South Dakota, in Hamlin County, South Dakota
